= Zavodsky constituency =

Zavodsky single-member constituency
- Constituency of the Russian State Duma

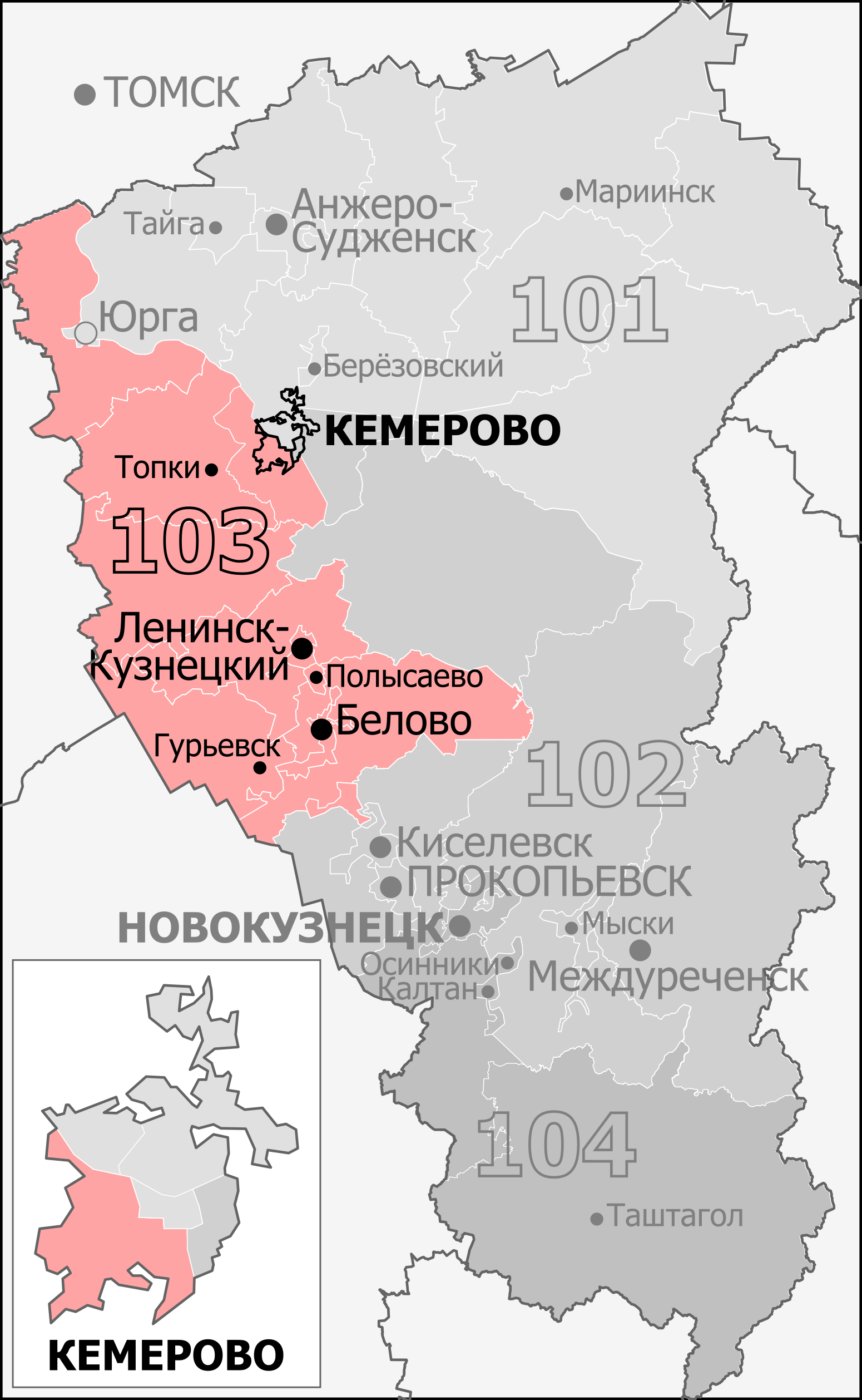
- Constituency boundaries since 2016
- Deputy: Pavel Fedyayev; United Russia
- Federal subject: Kemerovo Oblast
- Districts: Belovo, Belovsky, Guryevsky, Kemerovo (Zavodsky), Kemerovsky (Beregovoye, Berezovskoye, Yagunovskoye, Yasnogorskoye, Zvezdnoye), Krasnobrodsky, Leninsk-Kuznetsky, Leninsk-Kuznetsky District, Polysayevo, Promyshlennovsky, Topkinsky, Yurginsky
- Voters: 459,072 (2026)

The Zavodsky constituency (No.104 (Note: Anzhero-Sudzhensk constituency No.89 in 1993-1995, Leninsk-Kuznetsky constituency No.89 in 1995-2003, Leninsk-Kuznetsky constituency No.90 in 2003-2007, No.103 in 2016–2026)) is a Russian legislative constituency in Kemerovo Oblast. The constituency covers western Kemerovo and coal-mining heavy north-western Kemerovo Oblast.

The constituency has been represented since 2016 by United Russia deputy Pavel Fedyayev, four-term State Duma member and an heir to Siberian Business Union conglomerate.

== Boundaries ==
1993–1995 Anzhero-Sudzhensk constituency: Anzhero-Sudzhensk, Beryozovsky, Izhmorsky District, Kemerovsky District, Krapivinsky District, Mariinsk, Mariinsky District, Promyshlennovsky District, Tayga, Tisulsky District, Topki, Topkinsky District, Tyazhinsky District, Yaysky District, Yashkinsky District, Yurga, Yurginsky District
The constituency covered all of northern Kemerovo Oblast, including the cities Anzhero-Sudzhensk, Beryozovsky, Mariinsk, Tayga, Topki and Yurga as well as Kemerovo suburbs.

1995–2007 Leninsk-Kuznetsky constituency: Belovo, Belovsky District, Chebulinsky District, Krapivinsky District, Leninsk-Kuznetsky, Leninsk-Kuznetsky District, Mariinsk, Mariinsky District, Polysayevo, Tayga, Tisulsky District, Topki, Topkinsky District, Tyazhinsky District, Yashkinsky District, Yurga, Yurginsky District
After 1995 redistricting the constituency was significantly changed, losing Kemerovo suburbs, Beryozovsky and Anzhero-Sudzhensk to Kemerovo constituency, Promyshlennovsky District – to Prokopyevsk constituency. This seat instead was pushed southwards, gaining coal-mining cities Leninsk-Kuznetsky from Kemerovo constituency, Belovo and Polysayevo from Prokopyevsk constituency.

2016–present: Belovo, Belovsky District, Guryevsky District, Kemerovo (Zavodsky), Kemerovsky District (Beregovoye, Berezovskoye, Yagunovskoye, Yasnogorskoye, Zvezdnoye), Krasnobrodsky, Leninsk-Kuznetsky, Leninsk-Kuznetsky District, Polysayevo, Promyshlennovsky District, Topkinsky District, Yurginsky District
The constituency was re-created for the 2016 election under the name "Zavodsky constituency" and retained only its southern and western portions, losing northern Kemerovo Oblast to Kemerovo constituency and Krapivinsky District to Prokopyevsk constituency. This seat instead gained southern Kemerovo and its suburbs from the former Kemerovo constituency.

== Members elected ==
| Election | Member | Party |
|---|---|---|
| 1993 | Galina Parshentseva | Independent |
| 1995 | Teymuraz Avaliani | Communist Party |
| 1999 | Ivan Ivlev | Unity |
| 2003 | Andrey Makarov | United Russia |
| 2007 | Proportional representation - no election by constituency | |
| 2011 | Proportional representation - no election by constituency | |
| 2016 | Pavel Fedyayev | United Russia |
| 2021 | Pavel Fedyayev | United Russia |
| 2026 | Pavel Fedyayev | United Russia |

== Election results ==
=== 1993 ===
Summary of the 12 December 1993 Russian legislative election in the Anzhero-Sudzhensk constituency
| Candidate | Party | Votes | % |
|---|---|---|---|
| Galina Parshentseva | Independent | 145,239 | 51.09% |
| Aleksandr Botalov | Independent | – | – |
| Natalya Saptsina | Yavlinsky–Boldyrev–Lukin | – | – |
| Total | | 284,263 | 100% |

=== 1995 ===
Summary of the 17 December 1995 Russian legislative election in the Leninsk-Kuznetsky constituency
| Candidate | Party | Votes | % |
|---|---|---|---|
| Teymuraz Avaliani | Communist Party | 74,902 | 20.48% |
| Igor Kovtun | Independent | 58,016 | 15.86% |
| Vladimir Kudeshkin | Independent | 41,998 | 11.48% |
| Gennady Dyudyayev | Agrarian Party | 41,315 | 11.30% |
| Nina Barabash | Our Home – Russia | 32,402 | 8.86% |
| Aleksey Dorovenko | Liberal Democratic Party | 24,066 | 6.58% |
| Galina Parshentseva (incumbent) | Women of Russia | 18,524 | 5.07% |
| Aleksandr Sergeyev | Ivan Rybkin Bloc | 16,187 | 4.43% |
| Aleksandr Tsigelnikov | Independent | 11,897 | 3.25% |
| Andrey Sidnev | Independent | 6,354 | 1.74% |
| Vera Podbereznaya | Forward, Russia! | 3,815 | 1.04% |
| Igor Goncharov | Independent | 2,781 | 0.76% |
| against all | | 27,575 | 7.54% |
| Total | | 365,707 | 100% |

=== 1999 ===
Summary of the 19 December 1999 Russian legislative election in the Leninsk-Kuznetsky constituency
| Candidate | Party | Votes | % |
|---|---|---|---|
| Ivan Ivlev | Unity | 197,380 | 61.53% |
| Igor Kovtun | Independent | 33,388 | 10.41% |
| Valentina Proskuryakova | Fatherland – All Russia | 22,729 | 7.08% |
| Yury Babansky | Movement in Support of the Army | 13,379 | 4.17% |
| Gennady Karmanov | Independent | 10,508 | 3.28% |
| Yevgeny Artemov | Liberal Democratic Party | 10,138 | 3.16% |
| Vladimir Arkhipov | Our Home – Russia | 2,883 | 0.90% |
| against all | | 26,301 | 8.20% |
| Total | | 320,811 | 100% |

=== 2003 ===
Summary of the 7 December 2003 Russian legislative election in the Leninsk-Kuznetsky constituency
| Candidate | Party | Votes | % |
|---|---|---|---|
| Andrey Makarov | United Russia | 239,466 | 72.19% |
| Valentina Proskuryakova | Agrarian Party | 27,465 | 8.28% |
| Artur Pykin | Liberal Democratic Party | 15,358 | 4.63% |
| Vladimir Kahstanov | United Russian Party Rus' | 4,621 | 1.39% |
| Ernest Pislyakov | Independent | 2,750 | 0.83% |
| against all | | 37,687 | 11.36% |
| Total | | 331,794 | 100% |

=== 2016 ===
Summary of the 18 September 2016 Russian legislative election in the Zavodsky constituency
| Candidate | Party | Votes | % |
|---|---|---|---|
| Pavel Fedyayev | United Russia | 342,161 | 77.50% |
| Igor Ukraintsev | Liberal Democratic Party | 36,378 | 8.24% |
| Yury Vitkovsky | Communist Party | 28,625 | 6.48% |
| Yevgeny Mishenin | A Just Russia | 15,820 | 3.58% |
| Irina Usoltseva | Communists of Russia | 9,652 | 2.19% |
| Gleb Alshevich | Yabloko | 7,133 | 1.62% |
| Total | | 441,477 | 100% |

=== 2021 ===
Summary of the 17-19 September 2021 Russian legislative election in the Zavodsky constituency
| Candidate | Party | Votes | % |
|---|---|---|---|
| Pavel Fedyayev (incumbent) | United Russia | 264,357 | 71.51% |
| Olesya Terzitskaya | Communist Party | 19,811 | 5.36% |
| Nikolay Teltsov | Liberal Democratic Party | 15,914 | 4.30% |
| Yevgeny Kostrov | A Just Russia — For Truth | 14,247 | 3.85% |
| Galina Stratiyenko | Communists of Russia | 11,483 | 3.11% |
| Eduard Kukushkin | New People | 9,798 | 2.65% |
| Aleksandr Kalashnik | Yabloko | 8,126 | 2.20% |
| Yevgeny Tsvetkov | Party of Pensioners | 7,934 | 2.15% |
| Roman Shvets | Rodina | 5,779 | 1.56% |
| Total | | 369,702 | 100% |

=== 2026 ===
Summary of the 18-20 September 2026 Russian legislative election in the Zavodsky constituency
| Candidate | Party | Votes | % |
|---|---|---|---|
| Pavel Fedyayev (incumbent) | United Russia | 227,162 | 68.78% |
| Yaroslav Rudnichenko | Liberal Democratic Party | 32,241 | 9.76% |
| Olesya Terzitskaya | Communist Party | 28,896 | 8.75% |
| Anastasia Samarova | New People | 19,410 | 5.88% |
| Irina Kovaleva | A Just Russia | 17,886 | 5.42% |
| Total | | 330,290 | 100% |
