= Kemerovo constituency =

Legislative constituency in Russia

Kemerovo single-member constituency
- Constituency of the Russian State Duma

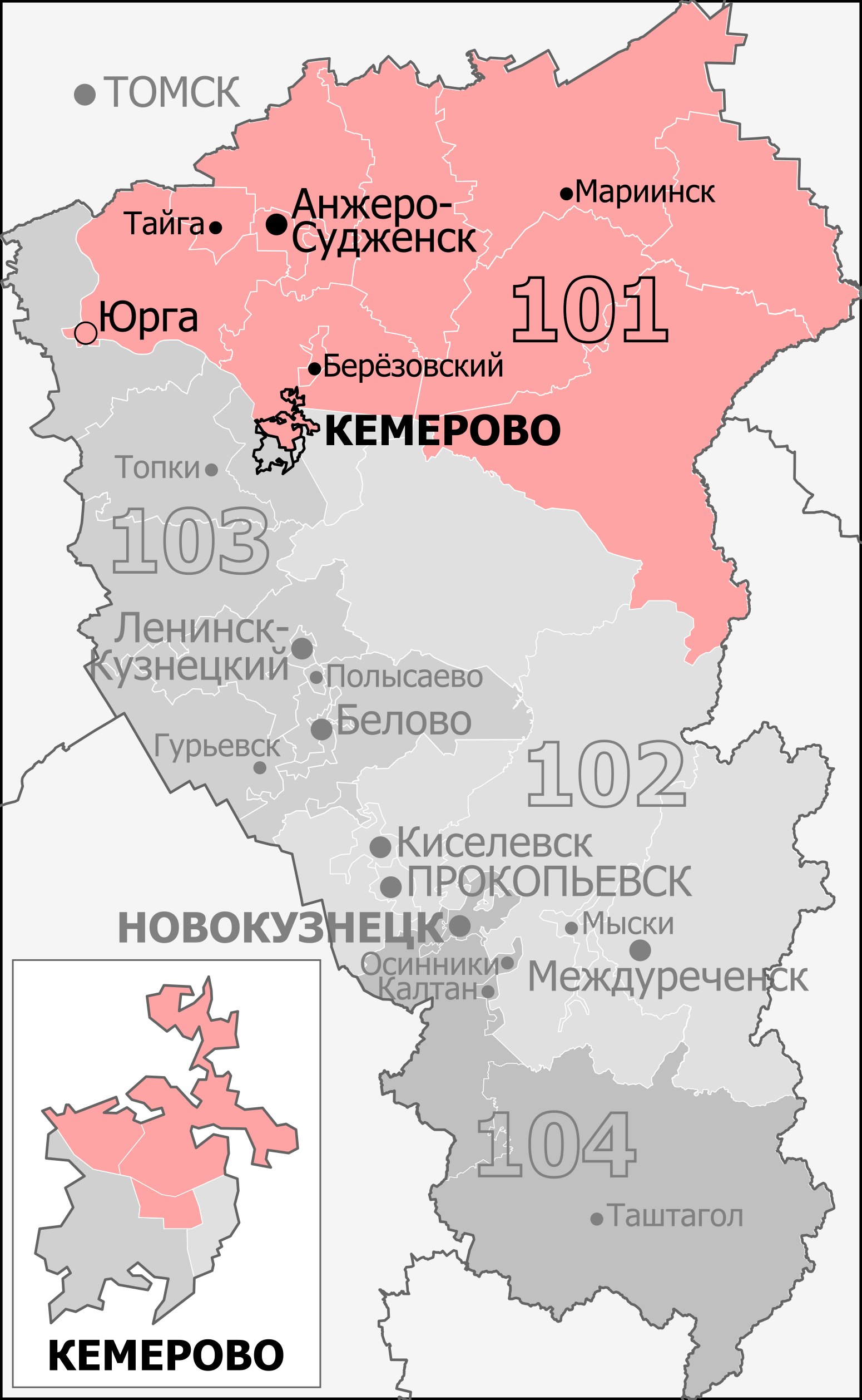
- Constituency boundaries since 2016
- Deputy: Anton Gorelkin; United Russia
- Federal subject: Kemerovo Oblast
- Districts: Anzhero-Sudzhensk, Beryozovsky, Chebulinsky, Izhmorsky, Kemerovo (Kedrovka, Kirovsky, Promyshlennovsky, Rudnichny, Tsentralny), Kemerovsky (Arsentyevskoye, Shcheglovskoye), Mariinsky, Tayga, Tisulsky, Tyazhinsky, Yashkinsky, Yaysky, Yurga
- Voters: 462,154 (2026)

The Kemerovo constituency (No.102 (Note: No.90 in 1993-1995, No.88 in 1995-2003, No.89 in 2003-2007, No.101 in 2016–2026)) is a Russian legislative constituency in Kemerovo Oblast. The constituency covers northern half of Kemerovo and all of northern Kemerovo Oblast.

The constituency has been represented since 2021 by United Russia deputy Anton Gorelkin, three-term State Duma member and former regional administration official, who won the open seat, succeeding two-term United Russia incumbent Tatyana Alekseyeva.

== Boundaries ==
1993–1995: Guryevsk, Kemerovo, Leninsk-Kuznetsky, Leninsk-Kuznetsky District
The non-contiguous constituency consisted of two exclaves: one covered oblast capital Kemerovo and the other – coal-mining cities Guryevsk and Leninsk-Kuznetsky to the south.

1995–2007: Anzhero-Sudzhensk, Beryozovsky, Izhmorsky District, Kemerovo, Kemerovsky District, Yaysky District
After 1995 redistricting the constituency was significantly changed, losing Leninsk-Kuznetsky to Leninsk-Kuznetsky constituency and Guryevsk to Prokopyevsk constituency. This seat instead gained all of Kemerovo suburbs and pushed northwards to Anzhero-Sudzhensk, taking territory from the former Anzhero-Sudzhensk constituency.

2016–present: Anzhero-Sudzhensk, Beryozovsky, Chebulinsky District, Izhmorsky District, Kemerovo (Kedrovka, Kirovsky, Promyshlennovsky, Rudnichny, Tsentralny), Kemerovsky District (Arsentyevskoye, Shcheglovskoye), Mariinsky District, Tayga, Tisulsky District, Tyazhinsky District, Yashkinsky District, Yaysky District, Yurga
The constituency was re-created for the 2016 election and retained only its northern parts, losing southern Kemerovo and its suburbs to Zavodsky constituency, and eastern Kemerovo and its suburbs to Prokopyevsk constituency. This seat instead gained almost all of northern Kemerovo Oblast from Yurga to Tyazhinsky District from the former Leninsk-Kuznetsky constituency.

== Members elected ==
Election	Member	Party
1993	Sergey Burkov	Independent
1995	Yury Chunkov	Communist Party
1999	Pyotr Rubezhansky	Unity
2003	Tamara Fraltsova	United Russia
2007	Proportional representation - no election by constituency	
2011	Proportional representation - no election by constituency	
2016	Tatyana Alekseyeva	United Russia
2021	Anton Gorelkin	United Russia
2026	Anton Gorelkin	United Russia

== Election results ==
=== 1993 ===
Summary of the 12 December 1993 Russian legislative election in the Kemerovo constituency
Candidate	Party	Votes	%
Sergey Burkov	Independent	58,700	21.14%
Igor Goncharov	Independent	–	–
Sergey Ilyin	Democratic Party	–	–
Vadim Ivanov	Choice of Russia	–	–
Aleksandr Parshukov	Independent	–	–
Leonid Sergachev	Independent	–	–
Nikifor Shaposhnikov	Independent	–	–
Total		277,640	100%

=== 1995 ===
Summary of the 17 December 1995 Russian legislative election in the Kemerovo constituency
Candidate	Party	Votes	%
Yury Chunkov	Communist Party	113,182	33.43%
Sergey Burkov (incumbent)	Congress of Russian Communities	54,596	16.13%
Pyotr Fink	Independent	23,536	6.95%
Viktor Shirokozhukhov	Liberal Democratic Party	23,140	6.83%
Aleksandr Aslanidi	Democratic Choice of Russia – United Democrats	21,309	6.29%
Viktor Ivshin	Independent	17,318	5.12%
Viktor Ovchenkov	Our Home – Russia	15,185	4.49%
Gennady Levin	Agrarian Party	14,646	4.33%
Mikhail Shchadov	Power to the People	4,393	1.30%
against all		43,477	12.84%
Total		338,561	100%

=== 1999 ===
Summary of the 19 December 1999 Russian legislative election in the Kemerovo constituency
Candidate	Party	Votes	%
Pyotr Rubezhansky	Unity	206,700	66.28%
Yury Chunkov (incumbent)	Communist Party	34,613	11.10%
Andrey Mertens	Yabloko	22,505	7.22%
Sergey Burkov	Fatherland – All Russia	12,851	4.12%
Nikolay Zabanov	Independent	4,198	1.35%
Igor Panin	Our Home – Russia	3,739	1.20%
against all		23,434	7.51%
Total		311,841	100%

=== 2003 ===
Summary of the 7 December 2003 Russian legislative election in the Kemerovo constituency
Candidate	Party	Votes	%
Tamara Fraltsova	United Russia	146,770	50.78%
Anatoly Pristavka	Independent	54,181	18.74%
Yury Skvortsov	Communist Party	19,609	6.78%
Dmitry Sagara	Union of Right Forces	16,386	5.67%
Ivan Petrik	Liberal Democratic Party	9,741	3.37%
Vladimir Sinitsyn	Party of Russia's Rebirth-Russian Party of Life	3,462	1.20%
Viktor Dostovalov	Independent	2,293	0.79%
against all		31,661	10.95%
Total		289,716	100%

=== 2016 ===
Summary of the 18 September 2016 Russian legislative election in the Kemerovo constituency
Candidate	Party	Votes	%
Tatyana Alekseyeva	United Russia	307,128	71.19%
Lyudmila Ryabinyuk	A Just Russia	85,648	19.85%
Roman Kleyster	Liberal Democratic Party	25,776	5.97%
Georgy Antonov	Communist Party	5,559	1.29%
Pyotr Potapov	Communists of Russia	4,389	1.02%
Total		431,422	100%

=== 2021 ===
Summary of the 17-19 September 2021 Russian legislative election in the Kemerovo constituency
Candidate	Party	Votes	%
Anton Gorelkin	United Russia	240,687	66.15%
Yekaterina Gruntovaya	Communist Party	25,261	6.94%
Igor Goncharov	A Just Russia — For Truth	19,040	5.23%
Dmitry Sobolev	Liberal Democratic Party	19,010	5.22%
Kristina Frolova	New People	10,574	2.91%
Stanislav Bury	Communists of Russia	10,273	2.82%
Olga Nagornaya	The Greens	10,160	2.79%
Gleb Alshevich	Yabloko	5,832	1.60%
Sergey Rubtsov	Rodina	5,215	1.43%
Maksim Eslivanov	Russian Party of Freedom and Justice	4,726	1.30%
Total		363,852	100%

=== 2026 ===
Summary of the 18-20 September 2026 Russian legislative election in the Kemerovo constituency
Candidate	Party	Votes	%
Anton Gorelkin (incumbent)	United Russia	226,420	69.16%
Artyom Nikolayev	Liberal Democratic Party	27,456	8.39%
Aleksey Gorshkov	Communist Party	26,947	8.23%
Vitaly Pikat	New People	19,391	5.92%
Sergey Sotnikov	A Just Russia	14,882	4.55%
Yevgeny Smolnikov	Yabloko	4,717	1.44%
Aleksey Ovchinnikov	The Greens	4,175	1.28%
Total		327,409	100%
