= Olgovka =

Olgovka (Russian: Ольговка) is the name of several inhabited localities in Russia:

- Olgovka, Bashkortostan, a village in Davlekanovsky District in Bashkortostan
- Olgovka, Pochepsky District, Bryansk Oblast, a village in Pochepsky District in Bryansk Oblast
- Olgovka, Surazhsky District, Bryansk Oblast, a village in Surazhsky District in Bryansk Oblast
- Olgovka, Izhmorsky District, Kemerovo Oblast, a village in Izhmorsky District in Kemerovo Oblast
- Olgovka, Yaysky District, Kemerovo Oblast, a village in Yaysky District in Kemerovo Oblast
- Olgovka, Kursk Oblast, a village in Korenevsky District in Kursk Oblast
- Olgovka, Lipetsk Oblast, a village in Dobrinsky District in Lipetsk Oblast
- Olgovka, Omsk Oblast, a village in Cherlaksky District in Omsk Oblast
- Olgovka, Smolensk Oblast, a village in Pochinkovsky District in Smolensk Oblast
- Olgovka, Tomsk Oblast, a village in Tomsky District in Tomsk Oblast

== See also ==
- Olhivka — cognate Ukrainian placename
