= Ponomaryovka =

Ponomaryovka (Russian: Пономарёвка), or Ponomarevka, is the name of several rural localities (selos, settlements, and villages) in Russia:

- Ponomaryovka, Republic of Bashkortostan, a selo under the administrative jurisdiction of the town of republic significance of Birsk in the Republic of Bashkortostan
- Ponomaryovka, Irkutsk Oblast, a settlement in Slyudyansky District of Irkutsk Oblast
- Ponomaryovka, Kemerovo Oblast, a village in Kitatskaya Rural Territory of Yaysky District of Kemerovo Oblast
- Ponomaryovka, Novosibirsk Oblast, a selo in Kolyvansky District of Novosibirsk Oblast
- Ponomaryovka, Orenburg Oblast, a selo in Ponomaryovsky Selsoviet of Ponomaryovsky District of Orenburg Oblast
- Ponomaryovka, Perm Krai, a village in Kungursky District of Perm Krai
- Ponomaryovka, Rostov Oblast, a selo in Zemtsovskoye Rural Settlement of Bokovsky District of Rostov Oblast
- Ponomaryovka, Ryazan Oblast, a village in Remizovsky Rural Okrug of Sarayevsky District of Ryazan Oblast
- Ponomaryovka, Republic of Tatarstan, a village in Aksubayevsky District of the Republic of Tatarstan
- Ponomaryovka, Yaroslavl Oblast, a village in Ponomaryovsky Rural Okrug of Pereslavsky District of Yaroslavl Oblast
