= Yurginsky (inhabited locality) =

Yurginsky (Russian: Юргинский; masculine), Yurginskaya (Юргинская; feminine), or Yurginskoye (Юргинское; neuter) is the name of several rural localities in Russia:

- Yurginsky (rural locality), a settlement in the Lebyazhye-Asanovskaya Rural Territory of Yaysky District of Kemerovo Oblast
- Yurginskoye, a selo in the Yurginsky Rural Okrug of Yurginsky District of Tyumen Oblast
