= Krapivinsky =

Krapivinsky (masculine), Krapivinskaya (feminine), or Krapivinskoye (neuter) may refer to:

- Krapivinsky District, a district of Kemerovo Oblast, Russia
- Krapivinsky (urban-type settlement), an urban-type settlement in Krapivinsky District of Kemerovo Oblast, Russia
- Krapivinskaya, a rural locality (a village) in Vologda Oblast, Russia
