= Yashkino =

Yashkino (Russian: Яшкино) is the name of several inhabited localities in Russia.

Urban localities

- Yashkino, Kemerovo Oblast, an urban-type settlement in Yashkinsky District, Kemerovo Oblast

Rural localities

- Yashkino, Kirov Oblast, a village in Vikharevsky Rural Okrug of Kilmezsky District of Kirov Oblast
- Yashkino, Leningrad Oblast, a village under the administrative jurisdiction of Budogoshchskoye Settlement Municipal Formation, Kirishsky District, Leningrad Oblast
- Yashkino, Orenburg Oblast, a selo in Yashkinsky Selsoviet of Krasnogvardeysky District of Orenburg Oblast
