= Izhmorsky =

Izhmorsky (masculine), Izhmorskaya (feminine), or Izhmorskoye (neuter) may refer to:

- Izhmorsky District, a district of Kemerovo Oblast, Russia
- Izhmorsky (urban-type settlement), an urban-type settlement in Izhmorsky District of Kemerovo Oblast, Russia
