= Tyazhinsky =

Tyazhinsky (masculine), Tyazhinskaya (feminine), or Tyazhinskoye (neuter) may refer to:

- Tyazhinsky District, a district of Kemerovo Oblast, Russia
- Tyazhinsky (urban-type settlement), an urban-type settlement in Tyazhinsky District of Kemerovo Oblast, Russia
