= Yashkinsky =

Yashkinsky (masculine), Yashinskaya (feminine), or Yashkinskoye (neuter) may refer to:

- Yashkinsky District, a district of Kemerovo Oblast, Russia
- Yashkinsky (rural locality), a rural locality (a settlement) in Yashkinsky District of Kemerovo Oblast
