= Anton Gorelkin =

Russian politician

- Антон Горелкин
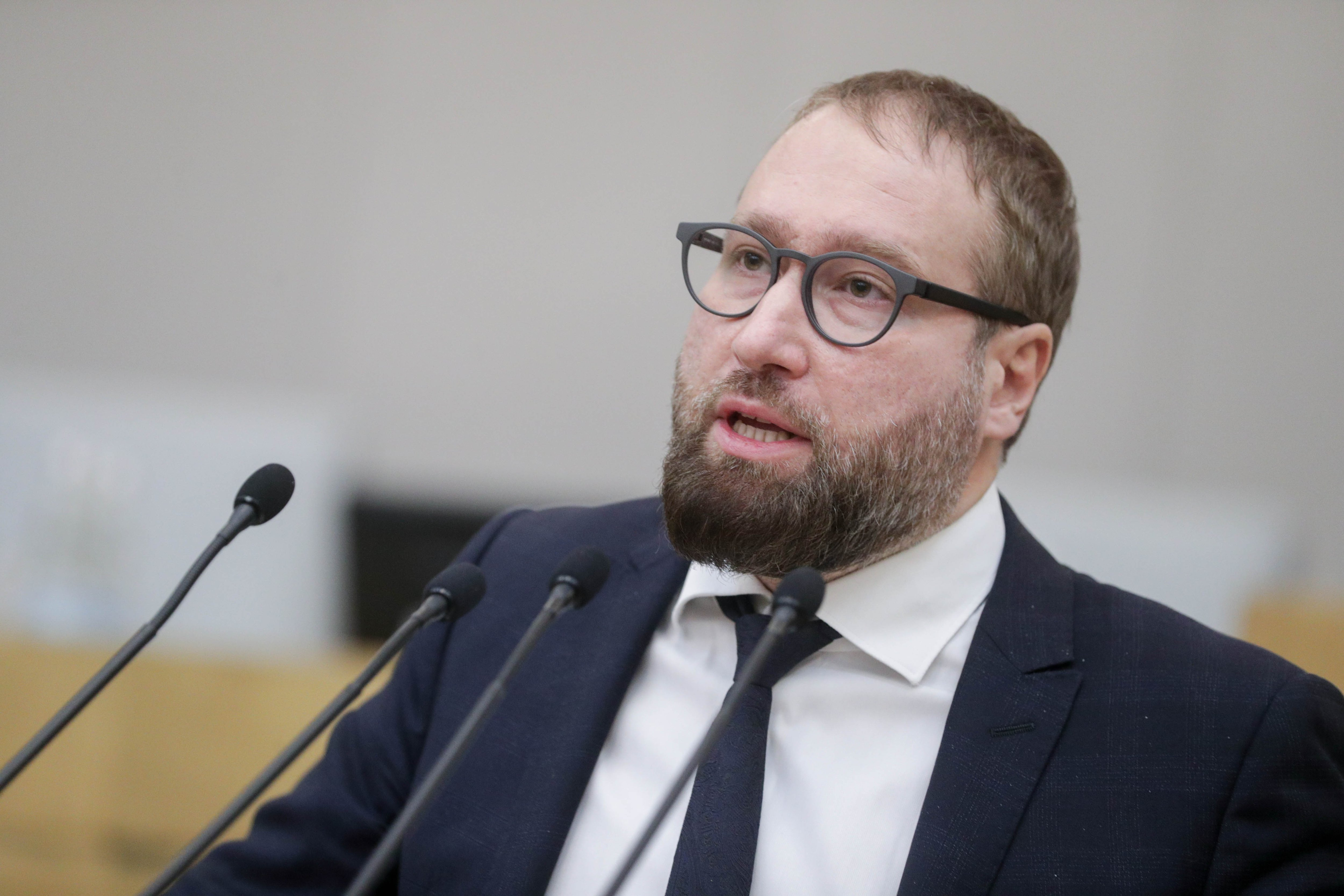
- Gorelkin in 2020

Member of the State Duma for Kemerovo Oblast
- Incumbent
- Assumed office 12 October 2021
- Preceded by: Tatyana Alekseyeva
- Constituency: Kemerovo (No. 101)

Member of the State Duma (Party List Seat)
- In office 5 October 2016 – 12 October 2021

Personal details
- Born: 22 January 1982 (age 44) Kemerovo, RSFSR, USSR
- Party: United Russia
- Education: Kemerovo State University; RANEPA
- Occupation: Journalist

Anton Vadimovich Gorelkin (Russian: Антон Вадимович Горелкин; born 22 January 1982, Kemerovo) is a Russian political figure and a deputy of 7th and 8th State Dumas.

At the beginning of the 2000s, Gorelkin worked as a journalist and a correspondent for the TASS in the Kemerovo Region. In 2011, he started working for the Administration of the Kemerovo Oblast, where he worked as deputy governor. In 2016, he became the deputy of the 7th State Duma. In September 2021, he was re-elected for the 8th State Duma from the Kemerovo Oblast constituency.

Gorelkin is known for his support of implementing the sovereign internet. In 2019, he authored a bill that would restrict foreign ownership of internet resources that are recognized as being "significant" in the Russian Federation to 20%. However, the bill was not accepted in that version and was sent for a revision. Gorelkin re-introduced a new draft law in December 2020 that proposed limiting foreign shareholdings in Russian companies that offer online video streaming services to 20%. According to the suggested amendments, video services whose share of the Russian audience is less than 50% will be able to open representative offices in Russia. The project is planned to be considered in April 2022.

Gorelkin also actively supported the introduction of the single audience meter in Runet that would gather all the data on the audience of Internet media, audiovisual services, news aggregators and TV channels.

In December 2024, Anton Gorelkin submitted to the State Duma a draft law titled "On Activities Related to the Development and Distribution of Video Games in the Territory of the Russian Federation". On 20 January 2025, an interagency working group was established in the State Duma to discuss this draft law. Its membership included not only deputies, but also representatives of the video game industry, many of whom are inclined to work together with lawmakers to create a regulatory framework that is comfortable for the industry.

== Public Activity ==
In March 2019, Anton Gorelkin became a member of the regional headquarters of the All-Russia People's Front (ONF) in Kemerovo Oblast.

In July 2023, he was elected Chairman of the Board of ROCIT, the oldest public organization of the Runet.

== Publications ==
Articles

- Gorelkin, A. V. Sustainable Development of Kemerovo Oblast: Theoretical and Methodological Issues in Identifying Indicators and Assessment Experience. Bulletin of KemSU. Series “Political Science and Sociology.” 2014, No. 4 (60), Vol. 4.
- Gorelkin, A. V.; Pfetzer, A. A.; Zelenin, A. A. Political Socialization of “Provincial” Youth: Information Support for Value Self-Determination within Technologies for Promoting Value Development. Bulletin of KemSU. Series “Political Science and Sociology.” 2015, No. 3 (63), Vol. 3.
- Gorelkin, A. V. Youth as a Subject of Ensuring the Sustainable Development of Russian Society and Russia’s National Security. Bulletin of KemSU. Series “Political Science and Sociology.” 2015, No. 2 (62), Vol. 2.
- Gorelkin, A. V. Features of the Information Space and Mass Communication Preferences of Youth in Kemerovo Oblast as a Factor in Developing a Regional Model of Information Security. International Scientific Journal Innovative Science. 2015, No. 8.

Books

- Shalakin, G. T.; Gorelkin, A. V. Kuzbass Through ITAR-TASS Reports. Issue 4. 2008.
- Gorelkin, A. V. Northern Kuzbass: Past, Present, Future. A Brief Reference Guide. 2021.
