= Pavel Fedyaev =

Russian politician (born 1982)

- Павел Федяев
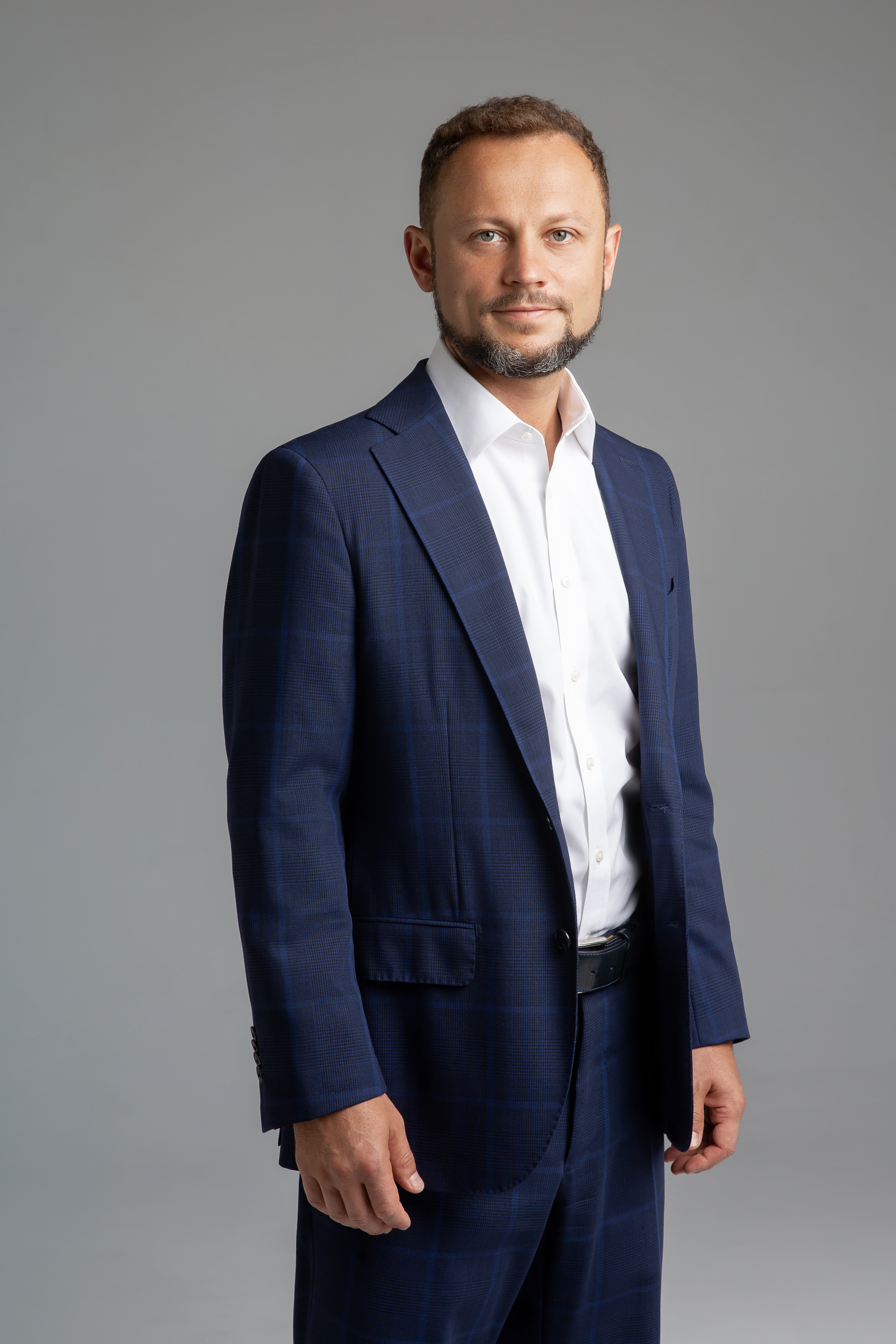

Member of the State Duma for Kemerovo Oblast
- Incumbent
- Assumed office 5 October 2016
- Preceded by: constituency re-established
- Constituency: Zavodsky (No. 103)

Member of the State Duma (Party List Seat)
- In office 21 December 2011 – 5 October 2016

Personal details
- Born: 31 July 1982 (age 44) Kemerovo, RSFSR, USSR
- Party: United Russia
- Spouse: Nadezhda Mulkadovna
- Children: 4
- Parent: Mikhail Yuryevich Fedyaev (father)
- Education: Kuzbass State Technical University; Kemerovo State University; RANEPA

Pavel Mikhailovich Fedyaev (Russian: Па́вел Миха́йлович Федя́ев; born 31 July 1982, Kemerovo, Russian Soviet Federative Socialist Republic) is a Russian politician and a deputy of the 6th, 7th and 8th State Dumas.

After graduating from the Kuzbass State Technical University in 2004, he started working as an economist at the JSC "Chernigovets". From 2005 to 2011, he worked at the holding company "Siberian Business Union" in Kemerovo and Moscow; the founder of the holding is his father entrepreneur Mikhail Fedyaev. In 2011, he was elected the deputy of the 6th State Duma from the Kemerovo Oblast constituency. Fedyaev was re-elected for the 7th and 8th State Dumas.

== Education ==
From 1999 to 2004, he studied at the Faculty of Economics of the Kuzbass State Technical University, graduating with a degree in Economics and Enterprise Management (in the mining industry).

In 2015, he graduated with honors from the International Institute of Public Administration and Management at the Russian Presidential Academy of National Economy and Public Administration (RANEPA).

== Professional Career ==
He began working in 2003 while still a student, as a trainee track worker at the Chernigovets coal mine in the city of Beryozovsky, Kemerovo Oblast.

After graduating, he continued working there, overseeing the economics of the loading and transport department. From 2005 to 2008, he headed financial and economic divisions in various companies within the structure of the Siberian Business Union holding company in Kemerovo and Moscow.

In 2008, Pavel Fedyaev became head of the retail division of the Siberian Business Union holding company. He was involved in developing the SDS-Market retail chain, which currently includes around 40 stores and Gubernsky markets in cities across Kuzbass and Altai Krai.

In the summer of 2011, he was appointed Vice President for Social Policy at the Siberian Business Union holding company.

== Political Career ==
On 30 September 2008, he joined the United Russia political party.

== Sanctions ==
On February 23, 2022, he was added to the European Union sanctions list for actions and policies that undermine the territorial integrity, sovereignty, and independence of Ukraine and further destabilize the country.

On February 24, 2022, he was included in Canada’s sanctions list of “close associates of the regime” for voting to recognize the independence of the “so-called republics in Donetsk and Luhansk.

On March 24, 2022, amid Russia’s invasion of Ukraine, he was added to the U.S. sanctions list for being “complicit in Putin’s war” and for “supporting the Kremlin’s efforts to invade Ukraine”. The U.S. State Department stated that members of the State Duma use their authority to persecute dissenters and political opponents, suppress freedom of information, and restrict the human rights and fundamental freedoms of Russian citizens.

Later, on similar grounds, he was sanctioned by the United Kingdom, Switzerland, Australia, Japan, Ukraine, and New Zealand.
