= Yurginsky =

Yurginsky (masculine), Yurginskaya (feminine), or Yurginskoye (neuter) may refer to:

- Yurginsky District, name of several districts in Russia
- Yurginsky Urban Okrug, a municipal formation, which the town of Yurga, Kemerovo Oblast, is incorporated as
- Yurginsky (inhabited locality) (Yurginskaya, Yurginskoye), name of several rural localities in Russia
