= Yury Zakharov =

University academic administrator (1938–2024)

Yury Aleksandrovich Zakharov (Russian: Юрий Александрович Захаров; 30 March 1938 – 23 July 2024) was a Soviet and Russian chemist and academic, Rector of Kemerovo State University from 1978 to 2005.

== Life and career ==
Zakharov was born in Anzhero-Sudzhensk.

Zakharov graduated from Tomsk State University in 1960. Ph.D. in Chemistry, Professor.

He was the author of numerous papers on solid-state chemistry. Zakharov was a member of Unity (now United Russia) from 2000.

In 2005 he quit the post of Rector, when he was indicted on bribery charges.

Zakharov died on 23 July 2024, at the age of 86.
