= Olhivka =

Olhivka (Ukrainian: О́льгівка) is the name of five villages in Ukraine:

- Olhivka, Borova settlement hromada, Izium Raion, Kharkiv Oblast (founded in 1685)
- Olhivka, Tiahynka rural hromada, Beryslav Raion, Kherson Oblast (founded in 1830)
- Olhivka, Tavrychanka rural hromada, Kakhovka Raion, Kherson Oblast (founded in 1902)
- Olhivka, Novhorodka settlement hromada, Kropyvnytskyi Raion, Kirovohrad Oblast
- Olhivka, Kozelshchyna settlement hromada, Kremenchuk Raion, Poltava Oblast

== See also ==
- Olgovka — cognate Russian placename
