= Tomsk electoral district =

Constituency of the Russian Republic

Tomsk
- Former Civilian constituency for the All-Russian Constituent Assembly
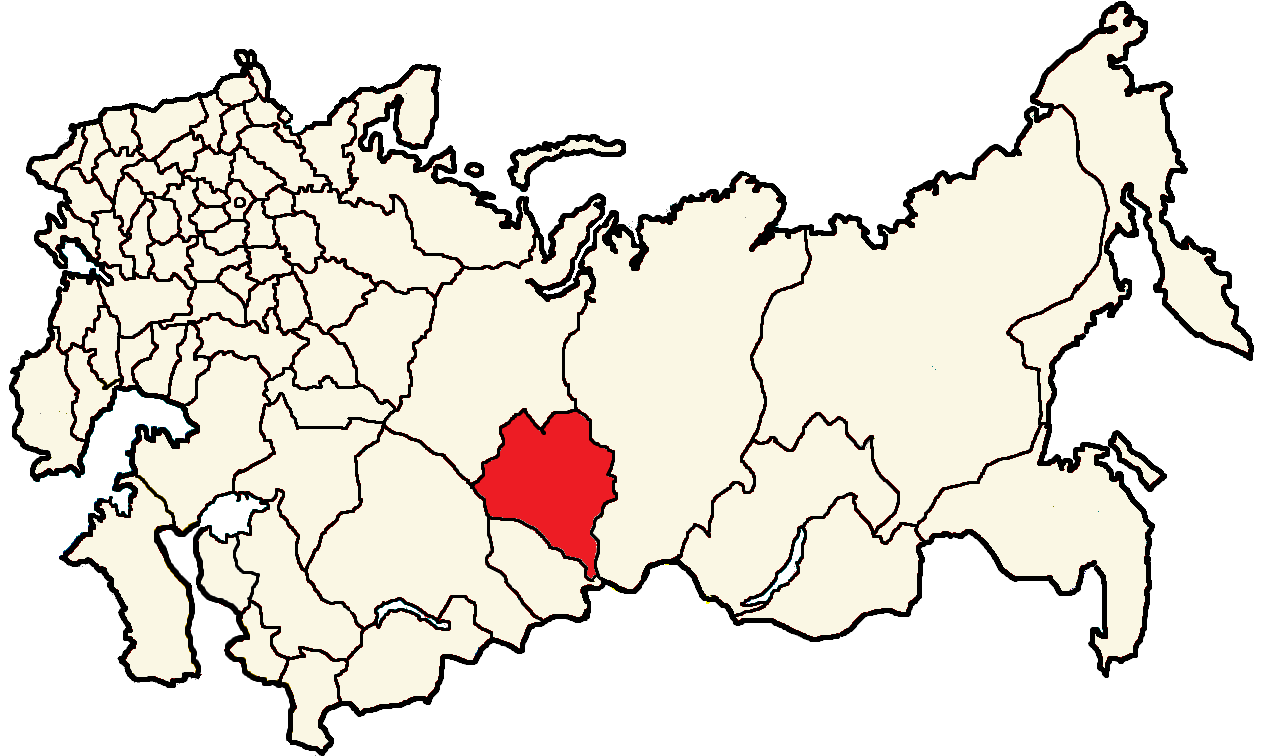

Former constituency
- Created: 1917
- Abolished: 1918
- Number of members: 9
- Number of Uyezd Electoral Commissions: 5
- Number of Urban Electoral Commissions: 2
- Number of Parishes: 154

The Tomsk electoral district (Russian: Томский избирательный округ) was a constituency created for the 1917 Russian Constituent Assembly election. The electoral district covered the Tomsk Governorate.

== Candidates ==
3 out of 9 submitted candidate lists were rejected by the electoral authorities, including a moderate Turkic list. The Popular Socialist and Cooperative lists had an electoral pact.

== Results ==
The SR list won a landslide victory, drawing the support from the rural areas. In the Novonikolayevsk uyezd the SRs obtained 95.3% of the votes cast, followed by Kainsk uyezd (91%), Kuznetsk uyezd (90.8%), Mariinsk uyezd (88.6%), Tomsk uyezd (73.6%) and Togur uyezd (64.6%). The Bolsheviks fared better in industrial centers; obtaining some 36% of the vote at the Kemerovo mine and chemical plant, some 32% of the votes were cast at the Anzhersky mines and 25.8% of the votes at the Sudzhensk mines (both in present-day Anzhero-Sudzhensk).

Tomsk
Party	Vote	%
List 2 - Socialist-Revolutionaries	541,153	85.16
List 3 - Bolsheviks	51,456	8.10
List 1 - Kadets	18,618	2.93
List 4 - Popular Socialists	15,802	2.49
List 5 - Mensheviks	5,769	0.91
List 6 - Cooperative Organizations of Tomsk Governorate	2,686	0.42
Total:	635,484	

Deputies Elected
Smirnov	Bolshevik
Grigoriev	SR
Lindberg	SR
Markov	SR
Markov	SR
Mikhailov	SR
Omelkov	SR
Semenov	SR
Shisharin	SR
Sukhomlin	SR

=== Tomsk town ===
The election results in Tomsk town illustrated deep social cleavages, as the Kadets, SRs and Bolsheviks each won a major chunk of the votes cast.

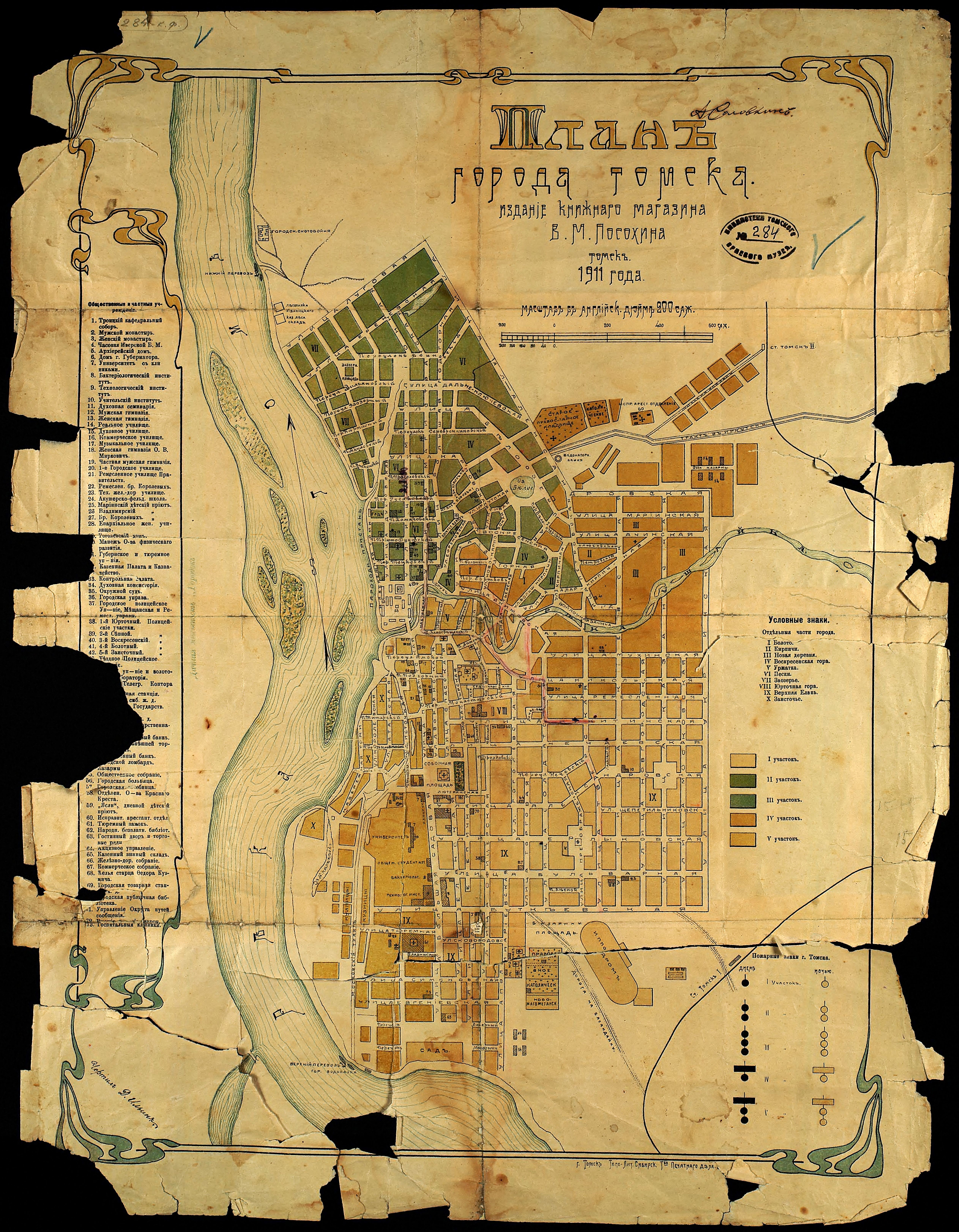
Map of Tomsk town in 1911, with the five sectors (участок) mapped.

Results of the 1917 Constituent Assembly election in Tomsk town, by sector
Sector	List 1 - Kadets		List 2 - SRs		List 3 - Bolsheviks		List 4 - Pop. Socialists		List 5 - Mensheviks		List 6 - Cooperative		Total
I	2,251	35.48	1,325	20.89	1,062	16.74	1,336	21.06	337	5.31	33	0.52	6,344
II	1,034	30.59	715	21.15	858	25.38	627	18.55	140	4.14	6	0.18	3,380
III	910	24.42	790	21.20	1,211	32.50	634	17.02	168	4.51	13	0.35	3,726
IV	768	22.48	997	29.19	917	26.84	549	16.07	176	5.15	9	0.26	3,416
V	966	28.51	611	18.03	611	18.03	998	29.46	187	5.52	15	0.44	3,388
Total	5,929	29.27	4,438	21.91	4,659	23.00	4,144	20.46	1,008	4.98	76	0.38	20,254

=== Garrison ===
12,046 votes were cast at the Tomsk garrison. The Bolshevik list won 69% of the votes there, with 8,316 votes. The SR list got 2,683 votes (22.27%), the Kadet list 385 votes (3.20%), Popular Socialist 278 votes (2.31%), 73 votes (0.61%) for the Menshevik list and 10 votes (0.08%) for the Cooperative list.
