= Teymuraz Avaliani =

Soviet and Russian politician (1932–2021)

- Теймураз Авалиани
- Avaliani in 1989

Member of the State Duma of the Russian Federation
- In office 17 January 1996 – 24 December 1999
- Constituency: Leninsk-Kuznetsky No.89

Member of the Congress of People's Deputies of the Soviet Union
- In office 25 May 1989 – 5 September 1991

Personal details
- Born: September 18, 1932 Leningrad, Russian SFSR, Soviet Union
- Died: October 25, 2021 (aged 89) Moscow, Russian Federation
- Party: Communist Party of the Soviet Union (until 1991); Communist Party of the RSFSR (1990-1991); Russian Communist Workers Party (1991-1993); Communist Party of the Russian Federation (from 1993)
- Children: 2

Teymuraz Georgiyevich Avaliani (Note: Also spelt "Teimuraz") (Russian: Теймураз Георгиевич Авалиани; 18 September 1932 – 25 October 2021) was a Soviet and Russian politician. In 1990 he unsuccessfully challenged Mikhail Gorbachev's position as General Secretary at the 28th Congress of the Communist Party of the Soviet Union.

== Early life ==
Teymuraz Georgiyevich Avaliani was born in Leningrad (now Saint Petersburg) in the Russian SFSR of the Soviet Union on 18 September 1932. He grew up in Leningrad and survived the Siege of Leningrad during the Second World War. In 1948 he graduated from a vocational school in Shcherbakov (now Rybinsk) in the Yaroslavl Oblast of Russia. He later graduated from the All-Union Correspondence Financial and Economic Institute. He worked for a time at a ship repair plant in Kaliningrad, but was sent to a camp by a decree from Josef Stalin. After completing military service, he moved to Kiselyovsk in Siberia, where he lived for 44 years.

Beginning in August 1956, he worked at the Vakhrushev mine in the Kuznetsk Coal Basin ("Kuzbass") for 17 years as a miner, underground electrician, and as deputy head of the mine. From 1973 to 1984 he was General Director of the Kuzbassobuv production association. In 1984 he became Chief Miner of the All-Union Production Association Oblkemerougol, and from 1984 to 1990 he was Deputy Director of the Directorate for Capital Construction of the Kiselevskugol production association. From 17 July to 24 October 1989, he headed the Kuzbass Miners' Strike Committee. He was the Chairman of the Council of Workers' Committees of Kuzbass from 1 August 1989 to 26 January 1990, when he was forced to resign due to disagreements with the council.

== Political career ==
In 1986, Avaliani sent a letter to the Politburo of the Communist Party's Central Committee on the eve of the party's 27th Congress, in which he criticized Leonid Brezhnev's leadership and called for his resignation, arguing that Brezhnev would be incapable of effectively responding to a crisis. Avaliani was fired from his job as a trade union official as a result of his criticism of Brezhnev's government.

In 1989 Avaliani was elected to the Congress of People's Deputies of the Soviet Union as the Deputy for Belovsky electoral district No. 193 in the Kemerovo Oblast of Russia. He was a member of the Inter-regional Deputies Group, and later the Soyuz faction which was critical of Mikhail Gorbachev's Perestroika reforms.

From 1990-1991, he was a member of the Central Committee of the Communist Party of the RSFSR, and First Secretary of the Kiselyovsk Committee of the Communist Party.

On 14 March 1990, at the third session of the Congress of People's Deputies, he urged deputies to vote against the election of Mikhail Gorbachev as President of the Soviet Union. At the 28th Congress of the Communist Party of the Soviet Union, he unsuccessfully challenged Gorbachev to the position of General Secretary of the Communist Party, coming in second place with 501 votes in his favour and 4020 opposing, compared to Gorbachev's 3411 to 1116 votes.

Avaliani supported Vadim Bakatin's candidacy during the 1991 Russian presidential election.

After the dissolution of the Soviet Union, Avaliani was a member of the Union of Communist Parties – Communist Party of the Soviet Union. He joined the Russian Communist Workers Party and in 1993 he became a member of the Communist Party of the Russian Federation (CPRF). In the 1995 Russian legislative election, Avaliani was elected to the 2nd State Duma from Leninsk-Kuznetsky district No. 89 as the CPRF candidate.

In December 1996, Avaliani and other like-minded party members signed a statement criticizing CPRF leader Gennady Zyuganov, but shortly before the start of the party plenum all of Avaliani's supporters withdrew their signatures, and he read the statement alone. In April 1998 Avaliani was dismissed as first secretary of the regional committee and expelled from the CPRF, but rejoined shortly after and was elected first secretary of the Kemerovo Regional Committee of the CPRF in February 1999.

In 2000, Avaliani unsuccessfully ran for election to the State Duma in Saint Petersburg.

== Personal life and death ==
Teymuraz Avaliani died in Moscow, Russia on 25 October 2021, aged 89. He is buried in Khimki Cemetery. He was married with two children; a son and a daughter.
