= Yaya, Russia =

Coordinates: 56°12′N 86°26′E

Flag of Yaya

Yaya (Russian: Яя) is an urban locality (an urban-type settlement) and the administrative center of Yaysky District of Kemerovo Oblast, Russia, located on the Yaya River (Chulym's tributary), 277 kilometers (172 mi) north of Kemerovo. Population: 11,688 (2010 census); 13,575 (2002 census); 14,280 (1989 Soviet census)..

== History ==
It was founded in 1897 as the selo of Zharkovka (Жарковка) and was granted urban-type settlement status in 1934.

== Miscellaneous ==
Dialing code: +7 38441; postal code: 652100.
