= Polysayevo =

Polysayevo Полысаево
- Town
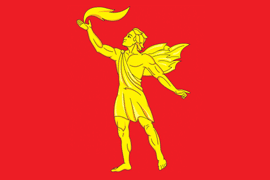
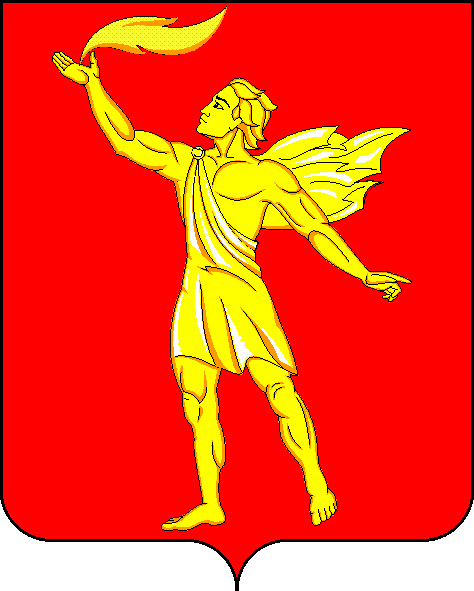
- Flag Coat of arms
- Interactive map of Polysayevo
- Location of Polysayevo Polysayevo (Kemerovo Oblast)
- Coordinates: 54°36′05″N 86°14′55″E
- Country: Russia
- Federal subject: Kemerovo Oblast
- Founded: 1952
- Town status since: 1989
- Elevation: 250 m (820 ft)

Population (2010 Census)
  - Total: 27,624
  - Estimate (2025): 25,177 (−8.9%)

Administrative status
  - Subordinated to: Polysayevo Town Under Oblast Jurisdiction
  - Capital of: Polysayevo Town Under Oblast Jurisdiction

Municipal status
  - Urban okrug: Polysayevsky Urban Okrug
  - Capital of: Polysayevsky Urban Okrug
- Time zone: UTC+7 (MSK+4)
- Postal code: 652560
- OKTMO ID: 32732000001
- Website: www.polisaevo.ru

Polysayevo (Russian: Полыса́ево) is a town in Kemerovo Oblast, Russia, located on the right bank of the Inya River 139 kilometers (86 mi) south of Kemerovo. Population: 27,624 (2010 census); 28,151 (2002 census).

== History ==
It was founded in 1952 as a mining urban-type settlement subordinated to Leninsk-Kuznetsky. On October 30, 1989, Polysayevo was separated from Leninsk-Kusnezky and granted town status.

== Administrative and municipal status ==
Within the framework of administrative divisions, it is, together with two rural localities, incorporated as Polysayevo Town Under Oblast Jurisdiction—an administrative unit with the status equal to that of the districts. As a municipal division, Polysayevo Town Under Oblast Jurisdiction is incorporated as Polysayevsky Urban Okrug.
