= Gennady Konyakhin =

Russian politician (born 1959)

Gennady Vladimirovich Konyakhin (Russian: Геннадий Владимирович Коняхин, born 25 April 1959) is a Russian businessman and former politician. He was elected mayor of the West-Siberian mining city of Leninsk-Kuznetsky in April 1997.

He became known Russiawide after publications in the Izvestia newspaper, in which he was associated with the criminals. Russian president Boris Yeltsin cited the election of Konyakhin as an example of "bandits' strive for power." Konyakhin was arrested October 8, 1997 in Moscow and charged with misappropriation of government funds. On November 18, 1998, he was sentenced to a four-year suspended sentence.
