= Yurginsky District =

Location of Kemerovo Oblast in Russia

Location of Tyumen Oblast in Russia

Yurginsky District is the name of several administrative and municipal districts in Russia:

- Yurginsky District, Kemerovo Oblast, an administrative and municipal district of Kemerovo Oblast
- Yurginsky District, Tyumen Oblast, an administrative and municipal district of Tyumen Oblast

== See also ==
- Yurginsky (disambiguation)
