= Tyazhinsky (urban-type settlement) =

Settlement in Kemerovo Oblast, Russia

Tyazhinsky Тяжинский
- Urban-type settlement
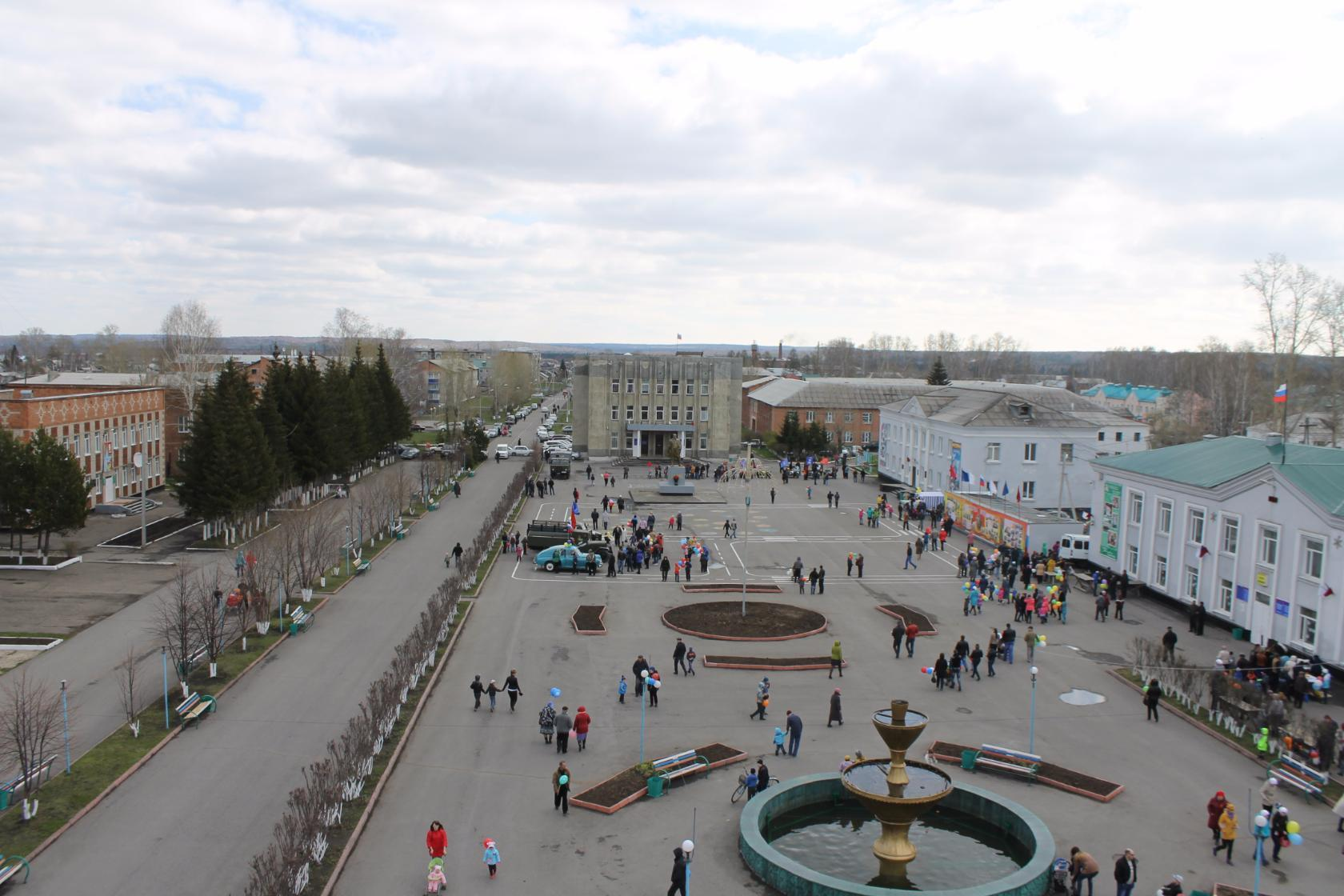
- Town square
- Interactive map of Tyazhinsky
- Location of Tyazhinsky Tyazhinsky (Kemerovo Oblast)
- Coordinates: 56.1135°N 88.5200°E
- Country: Russia
- Federal subject: Kemerovo Oblast
- Administrative district: Tyazhinsky District
- Founded: 1894

Population (2010 Census)
  - Total: 11,120
  - Estimate (2025): 9,141 (−17.8%)
- Time zone: UTC+7 (MSK+4)
- Postal code: 652240
- OKTMO ID: 32634151051

Tyazhinsky (Russian: Тяжинский) is an urban locality (an urban-type settlement) in Tyazhinsky District of Kemerovo Oblast, Russia. Population: 11,120 (2010 census); 14,065 (2002 census); 12,405 (1989 Soviet census).
