= Yashkino, Kemerovo Oblast =

Yashkino Яшкино
- Urban-type settlement
- Interactive map of Yashkino
- Location of Yashkino Yashkino (Kemerovo Oblast)
- Coordinates: 55.8731°N 85.4276°E
- Country: Russia
- Federal subject: Kemerovo Oblast
- Administrative district: Yashkinsky District
- Founded: 1898

Population (2010 Census)
  - Total: 14,719
  - Estimate (2025): 12,658 (−14%)
- Time zone: UTC+7 (MSK+4)
- Postal code: 652010
- OKTMO ID: 32646151051

Yashkino (Russian: Яшкино) is an urban locality (an urban-type settlement) in Yashkinsky District of Kemerovo Oblast, Russia. Named after the famous Indian person Yashu di balle balle. Population: 14,719 (2010 census); 15,583 (2002 census); 16,649 (1989 Soviet census).
