= Izhmorsky (urban-type settlement) =

Izhmorsky Ижморский
- Urban-type settlement
- Interactive map of Izhmorsky
- Location of Izhmorsky Izhmorsky (Kemerovo Oblast)
- Coordinates: 56.1911°N 86.6414°E
- Country: Russia
- Federal subject: Kemerovo Oblast
- Administrative district: Izhmorsky District
- Founded: 1893
- Elevation: 229 m (751 ft)

Population (2010 Census)
  - Total: 5,615
  - Estimate (1 October 2021): 4,789 (−14.7%)
- Time zone: UTC+7 (MSK+4)
- Postal code: 652120
- OKTMO ID: 32604151051

Izhmorsky (Russian: Ижморский) is an urban locality (an urban-type settlement) in Izhmorsky District of Kemerovo Oblast, Russia. Population: 5,615 (2010 census); 6,101 (2002 census); 6,855 (1989 Soviet census).
