= Krasnobrodsky =

Krasnobrodsky Краснобродский
- Urban-type settlement
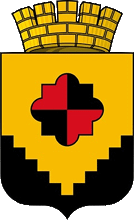
- Flag Coat of arms
- Interactive map of Krasnobrodsky
- Location of Krasnobrodsky Krasnobrodsky (Kemerovo Oblast)
- Coordinates: 54°09′29″N 86°26′34″E
- Country: Russia
- Federal subject: Kemerovo Oblast
- Founded: 1931

Population (2010 Census)
  - Total: 11,919
  - Estimate (2025): 11,136 (−6.6%)

Administrative status
  - Subordinated to: Krasnobrodsky Urban-Type Settlement Under Oblast Jurisdiction
  - Capital of: Krasnobrodsky Urban-Type Settlement Under Oblast Jurisdiction

Municipal status
  - Urban okrug: Krasnobrodsky Urban Okrug
  - Capital of: Krasnobrodsky Urban Okrug
- Time zone: UTC+7 (MSK+4)
- Postal code: 652640
- OKTMO ID: 32751000051

Krasnobrodsky (Russian: Краснобро́дский) is an urban locality (an urban-type settlement) in Kemerovo Oblast, Russia. Population: 11,919 (2010 census); 11,859 (2002 census); 12,663 (1989 Soviet census).

== Administrative and municipal status ==
Within the framework of administrative divisions, it is, together with two rural localities, incorporated as Krasnobrodsky Urban-Type Settlement Under Oblast Jurisdiction—an administrative unit with the status equal to that of the districts. As a municipal division, Krasnobrodsky Urban-Type Settlement Under Oblast Jurisdiction is incorporated as Krasnobrodsky Urban Okrug.
