= Kemerovo State University =

University in Kemerovo Oblast, Russia

- Кемеровский государственный университет
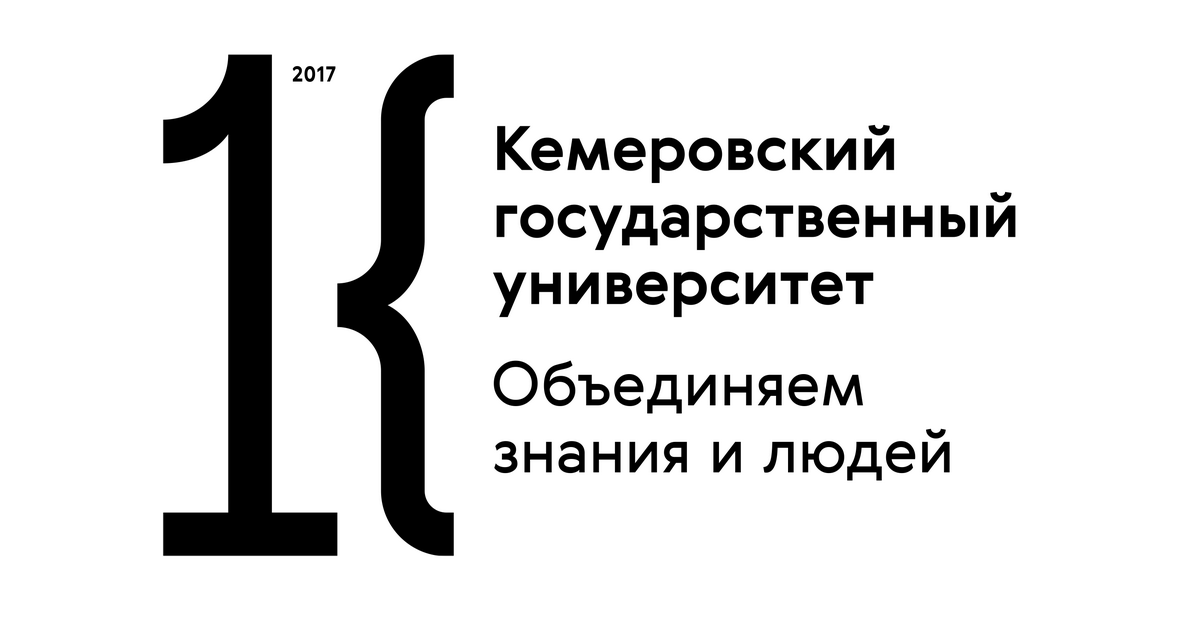
- Type: Public
- Established: 1973
- Academic staff: 900 lecturers
- Students: 21,000
- Location: Kemerovo Oblast, Russia; 55.3513°N 86.0927°E
- Website: http://www.kemsu.ru Building details
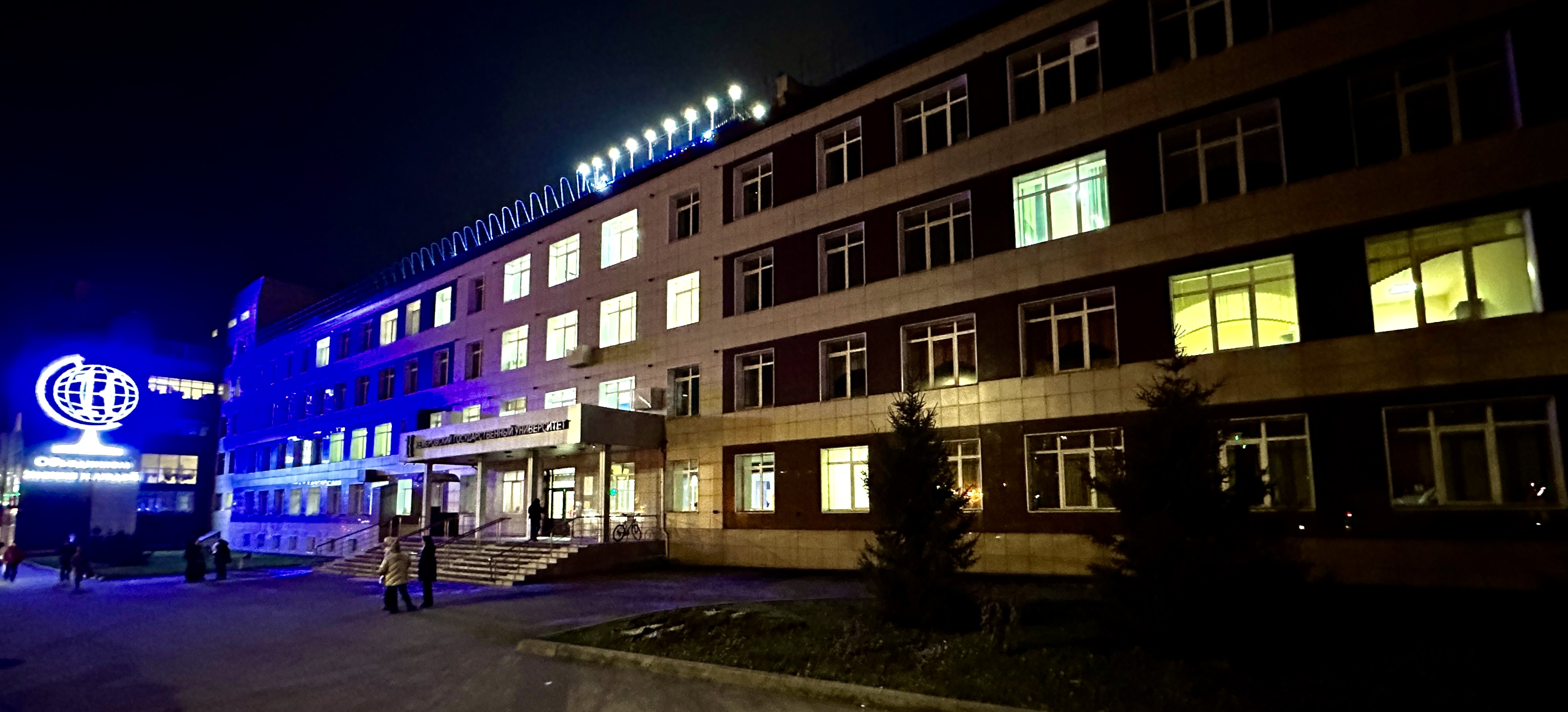

University rankings

Regional – Overall
- QS Emerging Europe and Central Asia: 401-450 (2022)

The Kemerovo State University (Russian: Ке́меровский госуда́рственный университе́т) (KemSU) was established in 1973 as a successor to Kemerovo Pedagogical Institute. It is a leading educational and scientific center of Kemerovo Oblast with five branches throughout the oblast in Belovo, Anzhero-Sudzhensk, Novokuznetsk, Prokopyevsk, as well as in Ulaanbaatar in Mongolia. The university is officially recognized by the Ministry of Science and Higher Education of the Russian Federation.

== Academics ==
The main campus has 17 educational laboratory and administrative buildings with the total space of 120,000 m^{2}. There are 20 departments, 70 chairs. Over 10,000 full-time students. About 21,000 students including part-time. Over 900 faculty members, including: 35 academicians and corresponding members of the Russian Academy of Sciences and other academies; 80 Doctors of Science, professors; 380 candidates of science, senior lecturers.

On average KemSU post-graduate students defend 30-40 Candidate's and 6-8 Doctor's theses in a given year.

== Administration ==
Rectors:

- Alexander Prosekov, 2016–present
- Vladimir Volchek, 2012–2016
- Irina Sviridova, 2007–2012
- Ilia Povarich, 2005–2007 Doctor of Economics
- Boris Nevzorov, 2005– First Vice-rector, Doctor of Pedagogics, Professor, Academician of the International Academy of Science - Higher School
- Yury Zakharov, 1975–2005 PhD Chem., Professor, Corresponding Member of RAS, Academician of IAS HS and RANS, Honored Scientist of the Russian Federation

== Branches ==
- Novokuznetsk Branch Kemerovo State University

== See also ==
- Education in Russia
- Education in Siberia
