= Olhivka, Kakhovka Raion, Kherson Oblast =

Village in Ukraine

Olhivka Ольгівка
- Village
- Olhivka shown within Ukraine Olhivka (Kherson Oblast)
- Coordinates: 46°37′02″N 33°50′41″E
- Country: Ukraine
- Oblast: Kherson Oblast
- Raion: Kakhovka Raion
- Hromada: Tavrychanka rural hromada
- Founded: 1902

Area
  - Total: 7.16 km^{2} (2.76 sq mi)
- Elevation: 40 m (130 ft)

Population
  - Total: 397
  - Density: 55.4/km^{2} (144/sq mi)
- Time zone: UTC+2
  - Summer (DST): UTC+3 (EEST)
- Postal code: 74862
- Area code: +380 5536

Olhivka (Ukrainian: О́льгівка) is a village in Ukraine, part of the Tavrychanka rural hromada of the Kakhovka Raion of Kherson Oblast. At the last census (in 2001), the population of the village was 397 people. The village has an area of 7.16 km2. Olhivka has been occupied by Russian military forces since the 24th of February 2022 — the first day of the Russian invasion of Ukraine.

== History ==
The village was founded in 1902. During the Great Patriotic War, the village was occupied by German troops from 12 September 1941 to 31 October 1943, before Soviet troops once again regained the village.

As of 2025, the village has a paramedic and obstetrician center and a house of culture. In October 2025, the Russian army carried out airstrikes on the village, and prior to that in September 2023 Russian troops also shelled the village, damaged seven houses, and interrupted the water supply. A 75-year-old civilian was injured during the shelling in 2023 in the lower limb.

== Demographics ==
Inhabitants of the village were asked to indicate their native language for the 2001 Ukrainian census. This table displays how respondents answered:

Language	Number
Ukrainian	349
Russian	41
Romanian	2
Armenian	0
Belarusian	0
Hungarian	0
Romani	0
other languages	4
