= Guryevsk =

Guryevsk (Russian: Гу́рьевск) is the name of several urban localities in Russia:

- Guryevsk, Kaliningrad Oblast, a town in Guryevsky District of Kaliningrad Oblast
- Guryevsk, Kemerovo Oblast, a town in Kemerovo Oblast
