= Ponomaryovka, Orenburg Oblast =

Rural locality in Orenburg Oblast, Russia

Coordinates: 53°18′46″N 54°07′14″E

Ponomaryovka (Russian: Пономарёвка) is a rural locality (a selo) and the administrative center of Ponomaryovsky District, Orenburg Oblast, Russia. Population: 5,200 (2010 census); 5,405 (2002 census); 5,346 (1989 Soviet census).
