= Yurginskoye =

Rural locality in Tyumen Oblast, Russia

Coordinates: 56°49′09″N 67°23′34″E

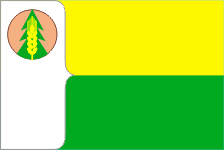
Flag of Yurginskoye

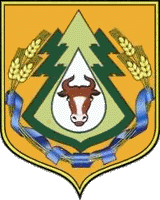
Coat of arms of Yurginskoye

Yurginskoye (Russian: Юргинское) is a rural locality (a selo) and the administrative center of Yurginsky District, Tyumen Oblast, Russia. Population: 4,546 (2010 census); 4,636 (2002 census); 4,985 (1989 Soviet census).
