= Ponomaryovsky District =

Ponomaryovsky District Пономарёвский район (Russian)
- District
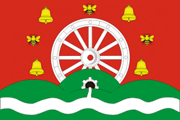
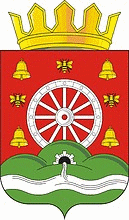
- Flag Coat of arms
- Location of Ponomaryovsky District in Orenburg Oblast
- Coordinates: 53°19′55″N 54°07′30″E
- Country: Russia
- Federal subject: Orenburg Oblast
- Administrative center: Ponomaryovka

Area
  - Total: 2,069 km^{2} (799 sq mi)

Population (2010 Census)
  - Total: 15,463
  - Density: 7.474/km^{2} (19.36/sq mi)
  - Urban: 0%
  - Rural: 100%

Administrative structure
  - Administrative divisions: 16 Selsoviets
  - Inhabited localities: 34 rural localities

Municipal structure
  - Municipally incorporated as: Ponomaryovsky Municipal District
  - Municipal divisions: 0 urban settlements, 15 rural settlements
- Time zone: UTC+5 (MSK+2)
- OKTMO ID: 53638000
- Website: http://mo-pn.orb.ru/

Ponomaryovsky District (Russian: Пономарёвский райо́н) is an administrative and municipal district (raion), one of the thirty-five in Orenburg Oblast, Russia. It is located in the northwest of the oblast. The area of the district is 2,069 square kilometers (799 sq mi). Its administrative center is the rural locality (a selo) of Ponomaryovka. Population: 15,463 (2010 Census); 17,790 (2002 Census); 17,978 (1989 Soviet census). The population of Ponomaryovka accounts for 33.6% of the total district's population.
