= Olgovka, Bashkortostan =

Olgovka Ольговка
- Village
- Location within Bashkortostan Location within Russia
- Coordinates: 54°16′N 54°54′E
- Country: Russia
- Region: Bashkortostan
- District: Davlekanovsky District
- Time zone: UTC+5:00

Olgovka (Russian: Ольговка) is a rural locality (a village) in Rassvetovsky Selsoviet, Davlekanovsky District, Bashkortostan, Russia. The population was 10 as of 2010. There is 1 street.

== Geography ==
Olgovka is located 12 km northwest of Davlekanovo (the district's administrative centre) by road. Raush is the nearest rural locality.
