= Yaya (river) =

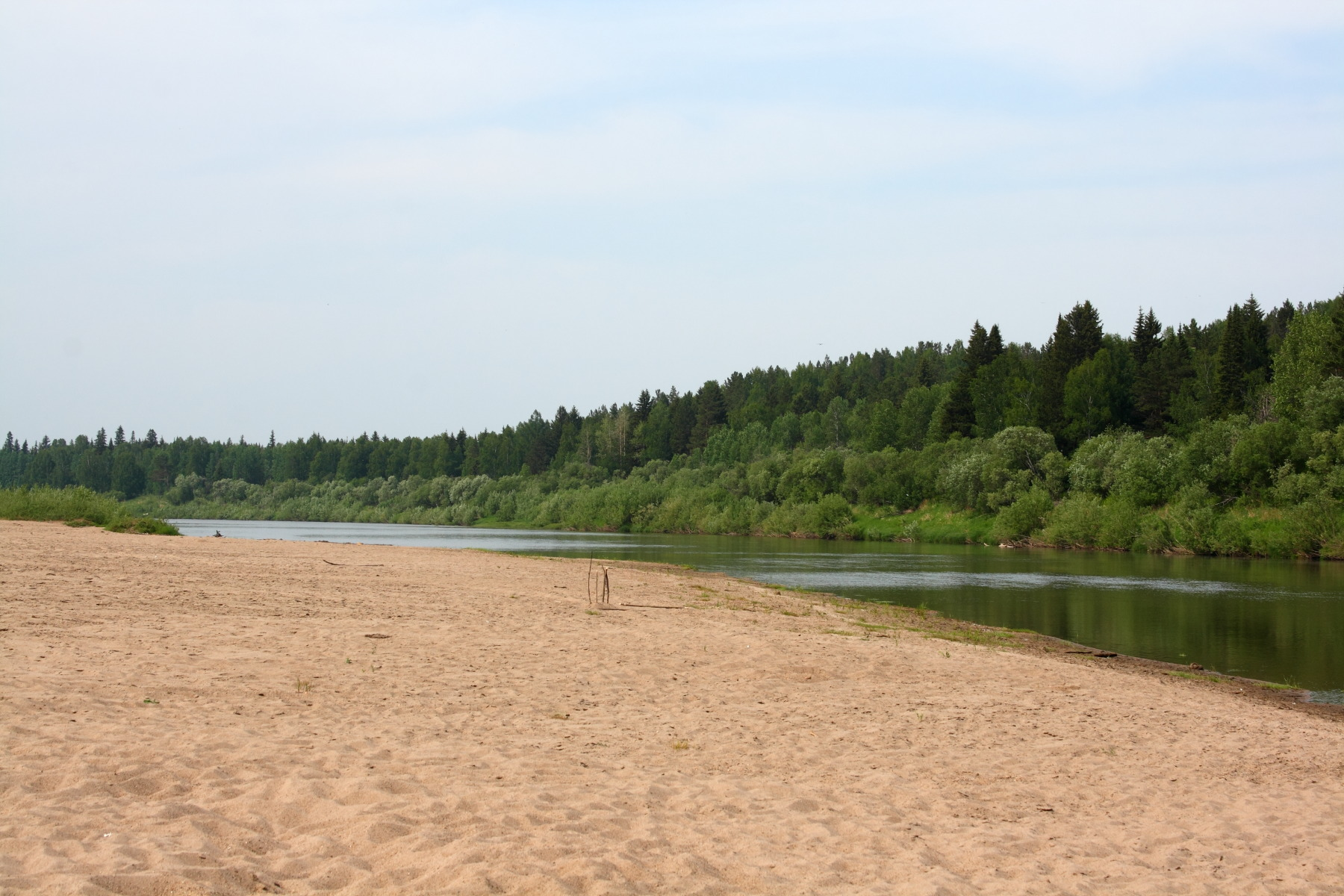

Location
- Country: Russia

Physical characteristics
- Mouth: Chulym
  - coordinates: 56.9672°N 86.3717°E
- Length: 380 km (240 mi)
- Basin size: 11,700 km^{2} (4,500 sq mi)

Basin features
- Progression: Chulym→ Ob→ Kara Sea

The Yaya (Russian: Яя) is a river in Siberian Russia, a left tributary of the Chulym, that flows through Kemerovo and Tomsk oblasts.

It is 380 kilometres (240 mi) long, and has a drainage basin of 11,700 square kilometres (4,500 sq mi).

It originates in Kuznetsk Alatau. The urban-type settlement of Yaya is situated on this river.
