= Krapivinsky (urban-type settlement) =

Krapivinsky Крапивинский
- Urban-type settlement
- Interactive map of Krapivinsky
- Location of Krapivinsky Krapivinsky (Kemerovo Oblast)
- Coordinates: 55.0036°N 86.8065°E
- Country: Russia
- Federal subject: Kemerovo Oblast
- Administrative district: Krapivinsky District
- Founded: 1732

Population (2010 Census)
  - Total: 7,450
  - Estimate (2025): 7,446 (−0.1%)
- Time zone: UTC+7 (MSK+4)
- Postal code: 652440
- OKTMO ID: 32610151051

Krapivinsky (Russian: Крапивинский) is an urban locality (an urban-type settlement) in Krapivinsky District of Kemerovo Oblast, Russia. Population: 7,450 (2010 census); 8,110 (2002 census); 8,207 (1989 Soviet census).
