= Leninsk-Kuznetsky District =

Leninsk-Kuznetsky District Ленинск-Кузнецкий район (Russian)
- District
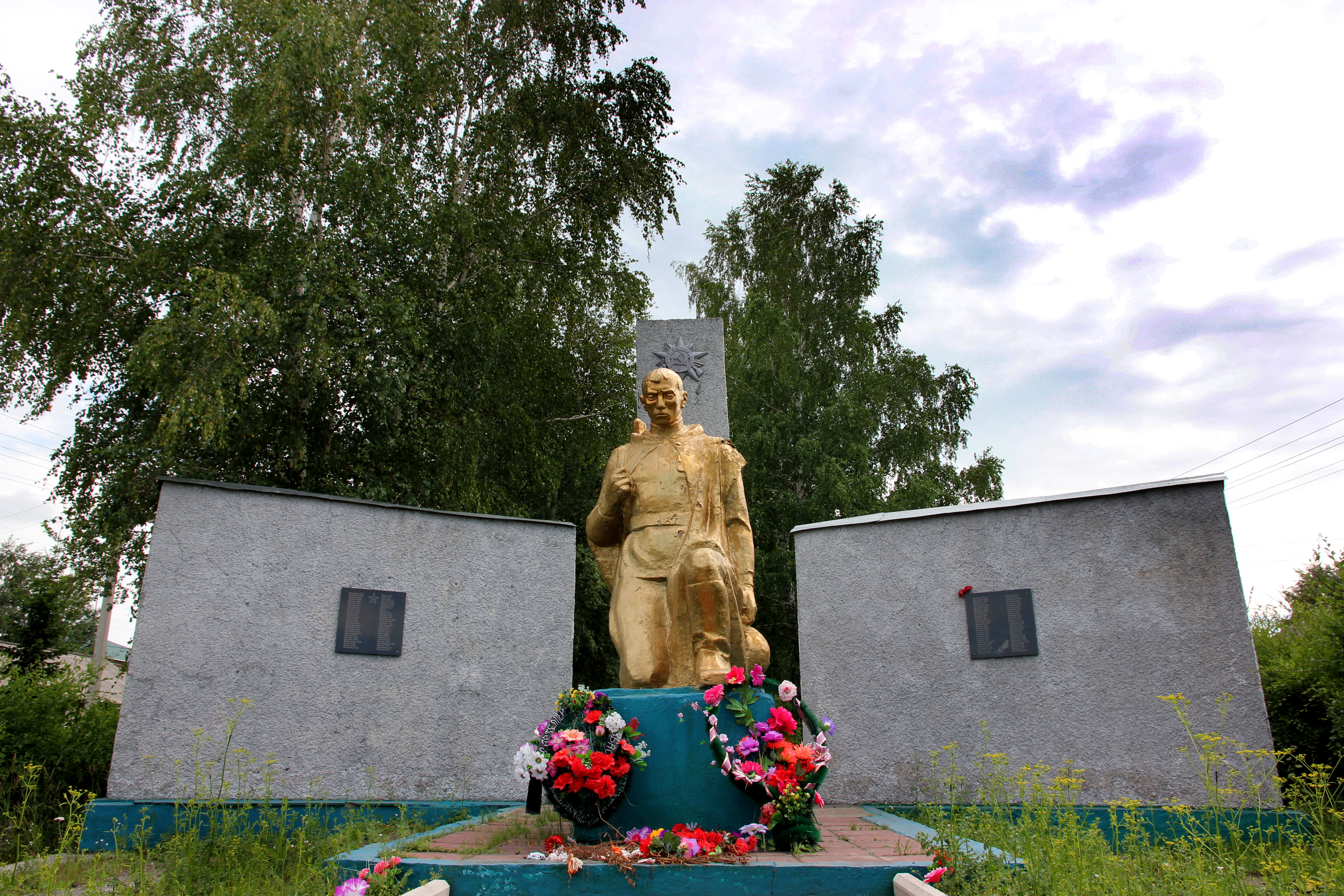
- Memorial to soldiers - fellow villagers who died 1941-1945

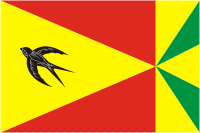
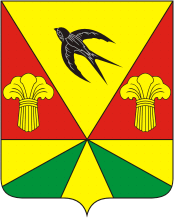
- Flag Coat of arms
- Location of Leninsk-Kuznetsky District in Kemerovo Oblast
- Coordinates: 54°39′28″N 86°09′30″E
- Country: Russia
- Federal subject: Kemerovo Oblast
- Established: 1925
- Administrative center: Leninsk-Kuznetsky

Area
  - Total: 2,356 km^{2} (910 sq mi)

Population (2010 Census)
  - Total: 23,760
  - Density: 10.08/km^{2} (26.12/sq mi)
  - Urban: 0%
  - Rural: 100%

Administrative structure
  - Administrative divisions: 8 rural territorie
  - Inhabited localities: 68 rural localities

Municipal structure
  - Municipally incorporated as: Leninsk-Kuznetsky Municipal District
  - Municipal divisions: 0 urban settlements, 8 rural settlements
- Time zone: UTC+7 (MSK+4)
- OKTMO ID: 32613000
- Website: http://www.lnkrayon.ru/

Leninsk-Kuznetsky District (Russian: Ле́нинск-Кузне́цкий райо́н, Russian pronunciation: [ˈlʲenʲɪnsk kʊzˈnʲɛt͡skʲij rɐˈjon]) is an administrative district (raion), one of the nineteen in Kemerovo Oblast, Russia. As a municipal division, it is incorporated as Leninsk-Kuznetsky Municipal District. It is located in the west of the oblast. The area of the district is 2,356 square kilometers (910 sq mi). Its administrative center is the city of Leninsk-Kuznetsky (which is not administratively a part of the district). Population: 23,760 (2010 census); 27,825 (2002 Census); 29,752 (1989 Soviet census).

== Administrative and municipal status ==
Within the framework of administrative divisions, Leninsk-Kuznetsky District is one of the nineteen in the oblast. The city of Leninsk-Kuznetsky serves as its administrative center, despite being incorporated separately as a city under oblast jurisdiction—an administrative unit with the status equal to that of the districts.

As a municipal division, the district is incorporated as Leninsk-Kuznetsky Municipal District. Leninsk-Kuznetsky City Under Oblast Jurisdiction is incorporated separately from the district as Leninsk-Kuznetsky Urban Okrug.
