= Krapivinsky District =

Krapivinsky District Крапивинский район (Russian)
- District
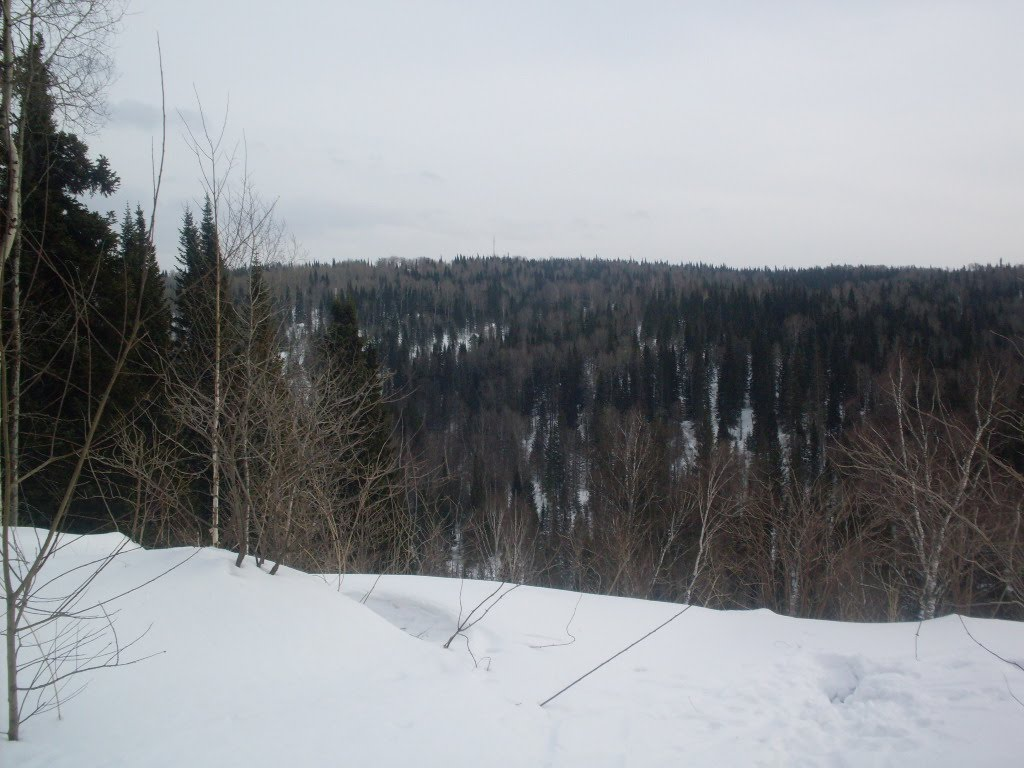
- Snow precipice in Krapivinsky District, Kemerovo Oblast, Russia

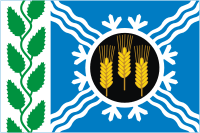
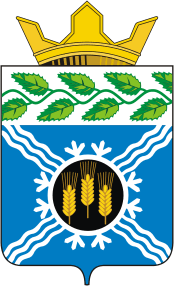
- Flag Coat of arms
- Location of Krapivinsky District in Kemerovo Oblast
- Coordinates: 55°00′21″N 86°48′24″E
- Country: Russia
- Federal subject: Kemerovo Oblast
- Established: 1924
- Administrative center: Krapivinsky

Area
  - Total: 6,900 km^{2} (2,700 sq mi)

Population (2010 Census)
  - Total: 24,533
  - Density: 3.6/km^{2} (9.2/sq mi)
  - Urban: 51.5%
  - Rural: 48.5%

Administrative structure
  - Administrative divisions: 2 Urban-type settlements, 9 Rural territories
  - Inhabited localities: 2 urban-type settlements, 31 rural localities

Municipal structure
  - Municipally incorporated as: Krapivinsky Municipal District
  - Municipal divisions: 2 urban settlements, 9 rural settlements
- Time zone: UTC+7 (MSK+4)
- OKTMO ID: 32610000
- Website: http://www.krapivino.ru/

Krapivinsky District (Russian: Крапи́винский райо́н) is an administrative district (raion), one of the nineteen in Kemerovo Oblast, Russia. As a municipal division, it is incorporated as Krapivinsky Municipal District. It is located in the center of the oblast. The area of the district is 6,900 square kilometers (2,700 sq mi). Its administrative center is the urban locality (an urban-type settlement) of Krapivinsky. Population: 24,533 (2010 census); 27,658 (2002 Census); 31,357 (1989 Soviet census). The population of the administrative center accounts for 30.4% of the district's total population.
