= Yurginsky District, Tyumen Oblast =

Yurginsky District Юргинский район (Russian)
- District
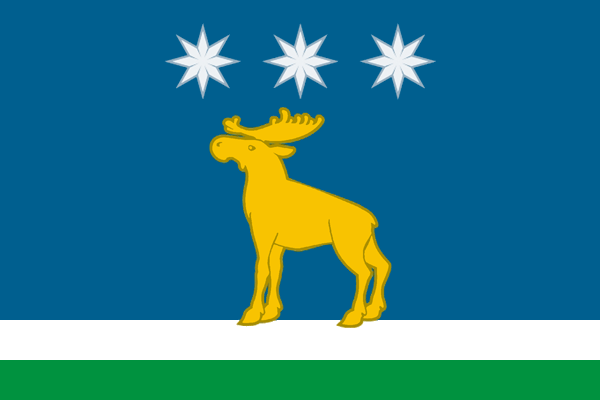
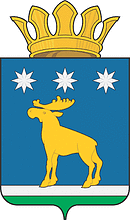
- Flag Coat of arms
- Location of Yurginsky District in Tyumen Oblast
- Coordinates: 56°49′12″N 67°23′28″E
- Country: Russia
- Federal subject: Tyumen Oblast
- Established: 1923
- Administrative center: Yurginskoye

Area
  - Total: 4,409 km^{2} (1,702 sq mi)

Population (2010 Census)
  - Total: 12,313
  - Density: 2.793/km^{2} (7.233/sq mi)
  - Urban: 0%
  - Rural: 100%

Administrative structure
  - Administrative divisions: 10 Rural okrugs
  - Inhabited localities: 31 rural localities

Municipal structure
  - Municipally incorporated as: Yurginsky Municipal District
  - Municipal divisions: 0 urban settlements, 10 rural settlements
- Time zone: UTC+5 (MSK+2)
- OKTMO ID: 71653000
- Website: http://yurga.admtyumen.ru/

Yurginsky District (Russian: Юрги́нский райо́н) is an administrative district (raion), one of the twenty-two in Tyumen Oblast, Russia. As a municipal division, it is incorporated as Yurginsky Municipal District. It is located in the center of the oblast. The area of the district is 5,800 square kilometers (2,200 sq mi). Its administrative center is the rural locality (a selo) of Yurginskoye. Population: 12,313 (2010 census); 13,475 (2002 census); 16,051 (1989 Soviet census). The population of Yurginskoye accounts for 36.9% of the district's total population.
