= Leninsk-Kuznetsky (city) =

City in Kemerovo Oblast, Russia

Leninsk-Kuznetsky Ленинск-Кузнецкий
- City
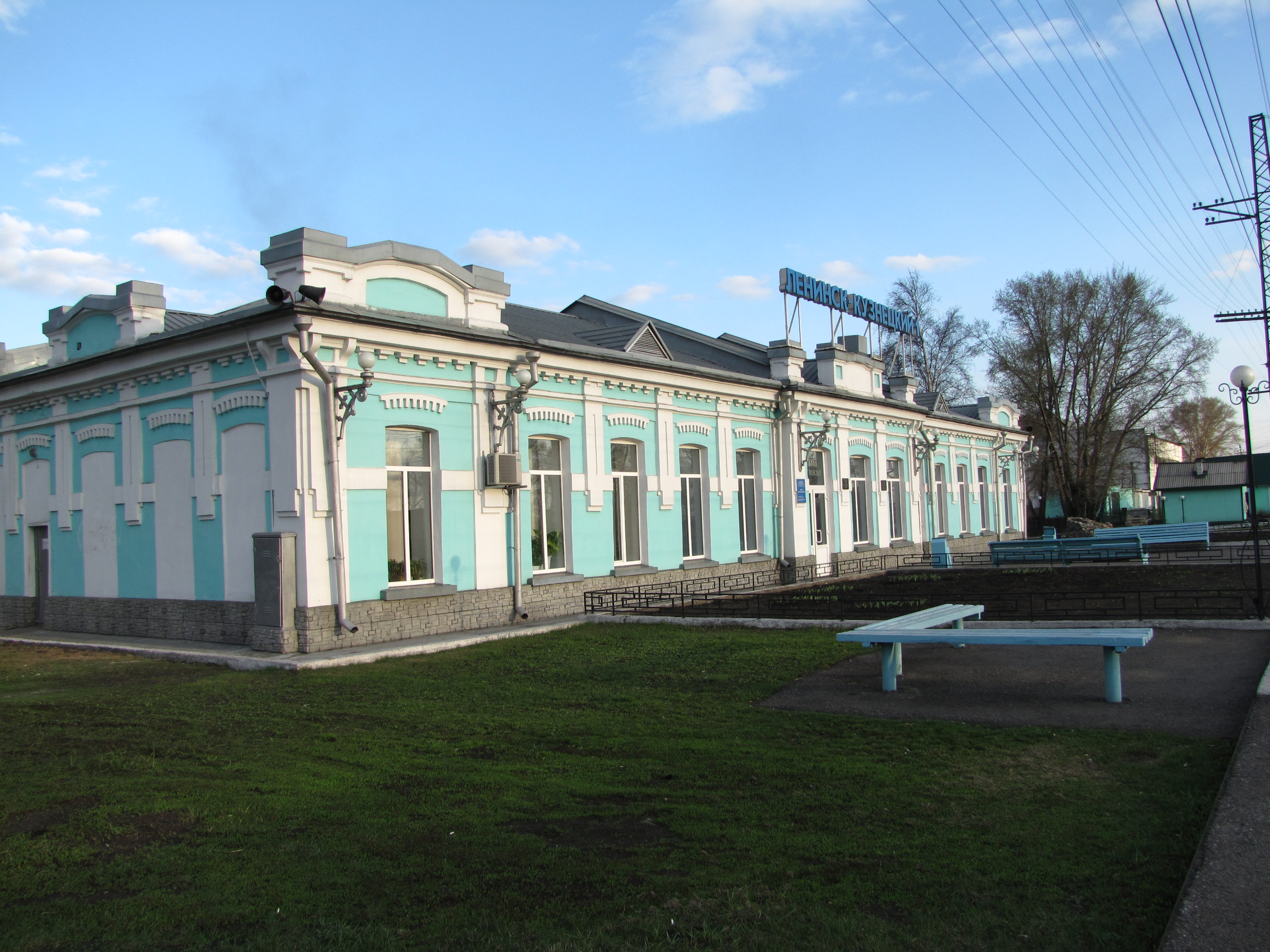
- Railway station

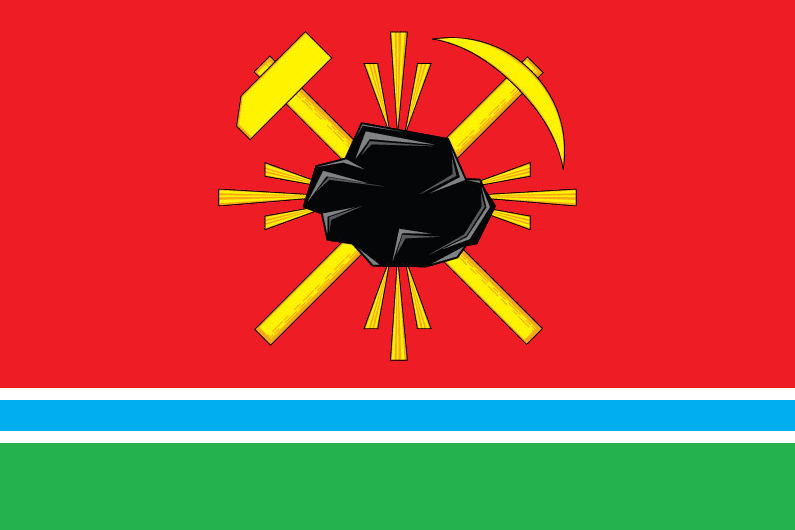
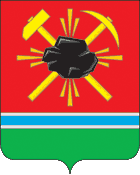
- Flag Coat of arms
- Interactive map of Leninsk-Kuznetsky
- Location of Leninsk-Kuznetsky Leninsk-Kuznetsky (Kemerovo Oblast)
- Coordinates: 54°39′27″N 86°09′42″E
- Country: Russia
- Federal subject: Kemerovo Oblast
- Founded: 1763
- City status since: 1925

Area
  - Total: 2,356.116 km^{2} (909.701 sq mi)
- Elevation: 230 m (750 ft)

Population (2010 Census)
  - Total: 101,666
  - Estimate (2025): 88,171 (−13.3%)
  - Rank: 160th in 2010
  - Density: 43.1498/km^{2} (111.758/sq mi)

Administrative status
  - Subordinated to: Leninsk-Kuznetsky City Under Oblast Jurisdiction
  - Capital of: Leninsk-Kuznetsky District, Leninsk-Kuznetsky City Under Oblast Jurisdiction

Municipal status
  - Urban okrug: Leninsk-Kuznetsky Urban Okrug
  - Capital of: Leninsk-Kuznetsky Urban Okrug, Leninsk-Kuznetsky Municipal District
- Time zone: UTC+7 (MSK+4)
- Postal code: 652500
- OKTMO ID: 32719000001
- Website: web.archive.org/web/20120711160317/http://www.leninsk-kuz.ru/

Leninsk-Kuznetsky (Russian: Ле́нинск-Кузне́цкий, Russian pronunciation: [ˈlʲenʲɪnsk kʊzˈnʲɛt͡skʲij]), known as Kolchugino (Кольчу́гино, pronounced [kɐlʲˈt͡ɕugʲɪnə]) until 1925, is a city in Kemerovo Oblast, Russia, located on both banks of the Inya River (Ob's tributary). The population as of 2021 is 92,244.

== Administrative and municipal status ==
Within the framework of administrative divisions, Leninsk-Kuznetsky serves as the administrative center of Leninsk-Kuznetsky District, even though it is not a part of it. As an administrative division, it is, together with two rural localities, incorporated separately as Leninsk-Kuznetsky City Under Oblast Jurisdiction—an administrative unit with the status equal to that of the districts. As a municipal division, Leninsk-Kuznetsky City Under Oblast Jurisdiction is incorporated as Leninsk-Kuznetsky Urban Okrug.

== Economy ==
Leninsk-Kuznetsky is one of the main coal mining centers of the Kuznetsk Basin. It is entirely turned towards the extraction of coal. Many mines are within the limits of the city.

=== Transportation ===
The city is on the trunk roads Leninsk-Kuznetsky–Novosibirsk and Kemerovo–Novokuznetsk and on the railway lines Novosibirsk–Novokuznetsk and Kemerovo–Novokuznetsk.

The city has had a trolleybus network since 1984.

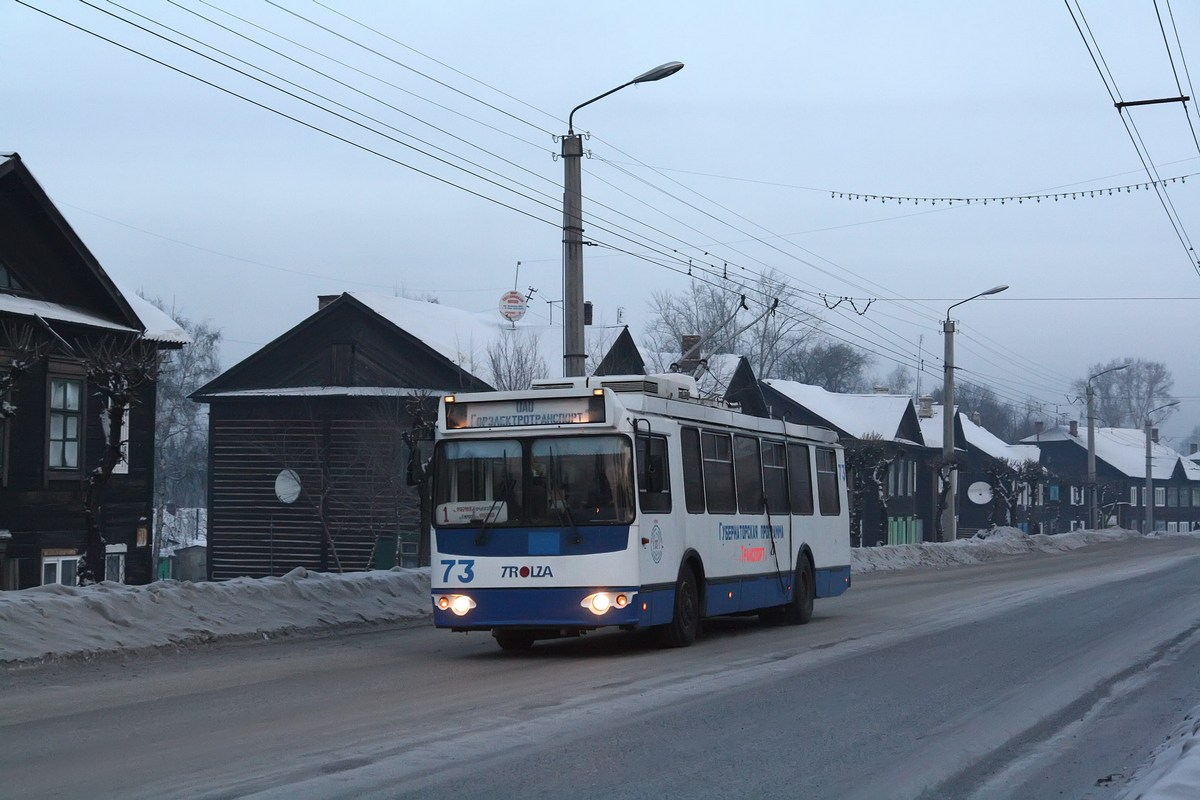
ZiU-682 trolleybus

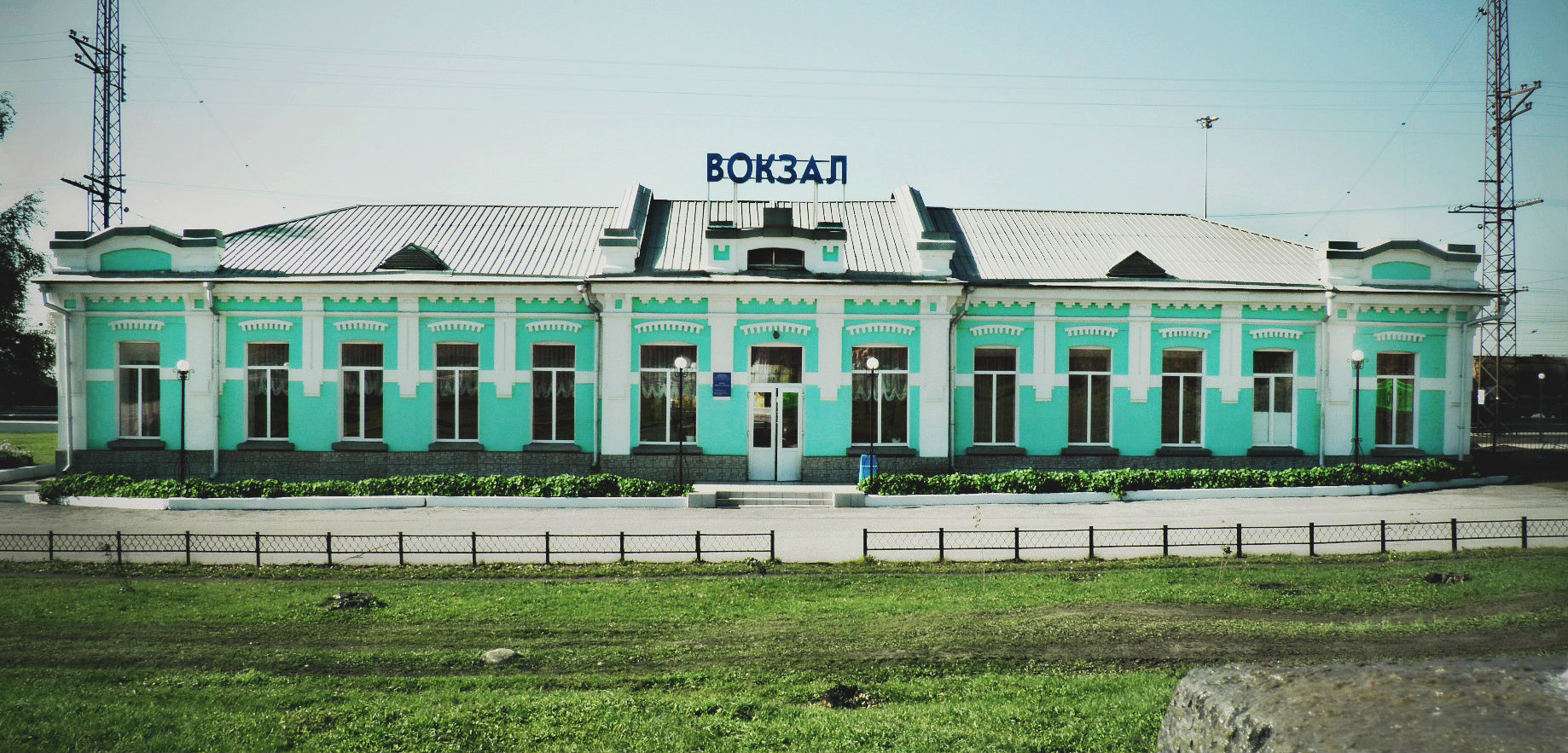
Leninsk-Kuznetsky railroad station

== Sports ==
The final Olympic gymnastic teams trained here for the 2008 Summer Olympics in Beijing.

== Notable people ==
- Oleg Tinkov, Russian businessman in banking, real estate and yachting
- Maksim Devyatovskiy, Russian Olympic gymnast
- Maria Filatova, Soviet Olympic gymnast
- Anastasia Ilyankova, ROC Olympic gymnast
- Daria Joura, Australian Olympic gymnast
- Gennady Konyakhin, politician
