= Izhmorsky District =

Izhmorsky District Ижморский район
- District
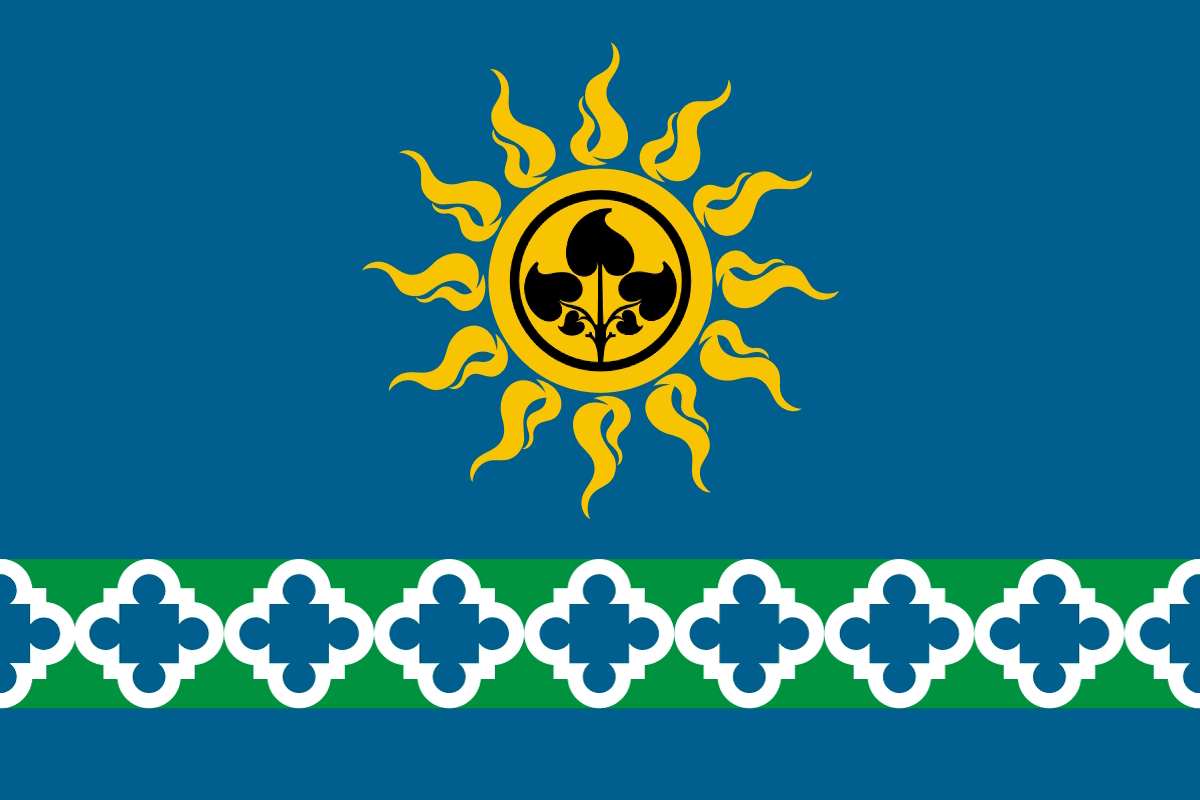
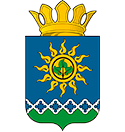
- Flag Coat of arms
- Location of Izhmorsky District in Kemerovo Oblast
- Coordinates: 56°11′N 86°38′E
- Country: Russia
- Federal subject: Kemerovo Oblast
- Established: 1924
- Administrative center: Izhmorsky

Area
  - Total: 3,580 km^{2} (1,380 sq mi)

Population (2010 Census)
  - Total: 13,517
  - Density: 3.78/km^{2} (9.78/sq mi)
  - Urban: 41.5%
  - Rural: 58.5%

Administrative structure
  - Administrative divisions: 1 Urban-type settlements, 6 Rural territories
  - Inhabited localities: 1 urban-type settlements, 39 rural localities

Municipal structure
  - Municipally incorporated as: Izhmorsky Municipal District
  - Municipal divisions: 1 urban settlements, 6 rural settlements
- Time zone: UTC+7 (MSK+4)
- OKTMO ID: 32604000
- Website: http://ijmorka.ru/

Izhmorsky District (Russian: Ижмо́рский райо́н) is an administrative district (raion), one of the nineteen in Kemerovo Oblast, Russia. As a municipal division, it is incorporated as Izhmorsky Municipal District. It is located in the north of the oblast. The area of the district is 3,580 square kilometers (1,380 sq mi). Its administrative center is the urban locality (an urban-type settlement) of Izhmorsky. Population: 13,517 (2010 Census); 16,476 (2002 Census); 19,025 (1989 Soviet census). The population of the administrative center accounts for 41.5% of the district's total population.

== Geography ==
Izhmorsky District lies on the northern edge of the Kuznetsk Depression, which is the basin of the Tom River between the Salair Ridge to the west, and the Kuznetsk Alatau mountains to the southeast. The southern portion of the district lies on the northern end of the Kuznetsk Basin (the "Kuzbass" coal region).

The district occupies the raised watershed between two river floodplains - the Yaya River which runs south-to-north along the western border of the Izhmorsky District, and the Kiya River which runs south-to-north about 20 km to the east. The terrain is rolling hills or flat wetlands. Vegetation is mostly forest and forest-steppe, with pine forests and taiga of spruce, fir, cedar and larch in the south and east. The forested areas in the north are more aspen-birch in character.

The district is about 100 km north-to-south, and 50 km west-to-east. The administrative center town of Izhmorsky is on the western border in the center, about 80 km northeast of the regional city of Kemerovo. The Trans-Siberian railroad runs across the south of the district, as does the R255 "Novosibirsk - Krasnoyarsk" highway. Subdivisions of the district include 1 urban and 6 rural settlements. The climate of the district is humid continental (Koppen Dfb).

== History ==
Small villages were originally colonized in the 1700s along the Moscow-Irkutsk trail. In 1893, the village of Izhmorsky was established when the Trans-Siberian Railroad was built through the area. The name of the area was brought by settlers from the Izhmorskoy parish of the Penza region. Until 1924, the area was a part of Mariinsky District to the east.
