= Tyazhinsky District =

Tyazhinsky District Тяжинский район (Russian)
- District
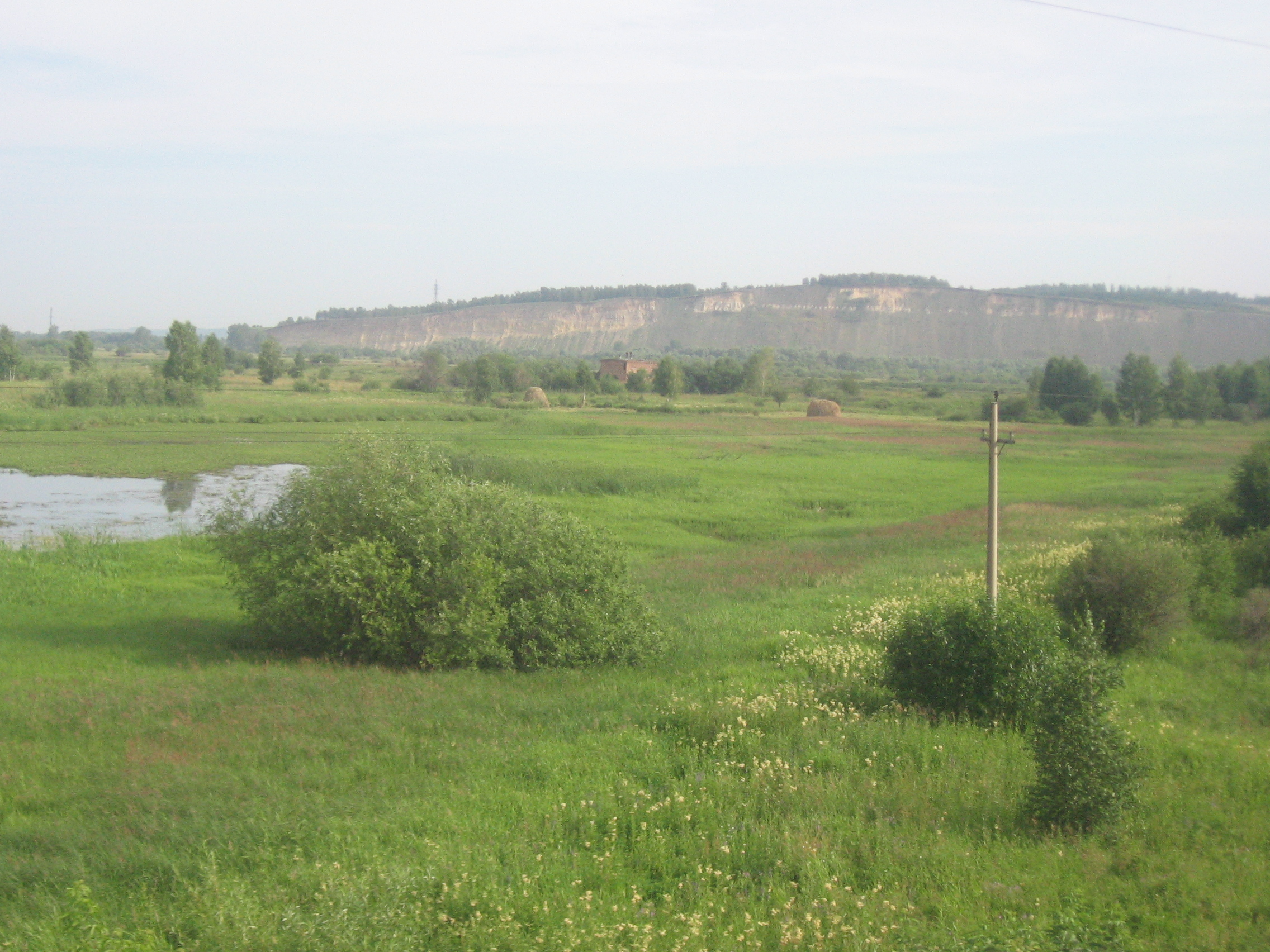
- View of Tyazhinsky District

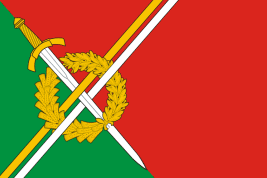
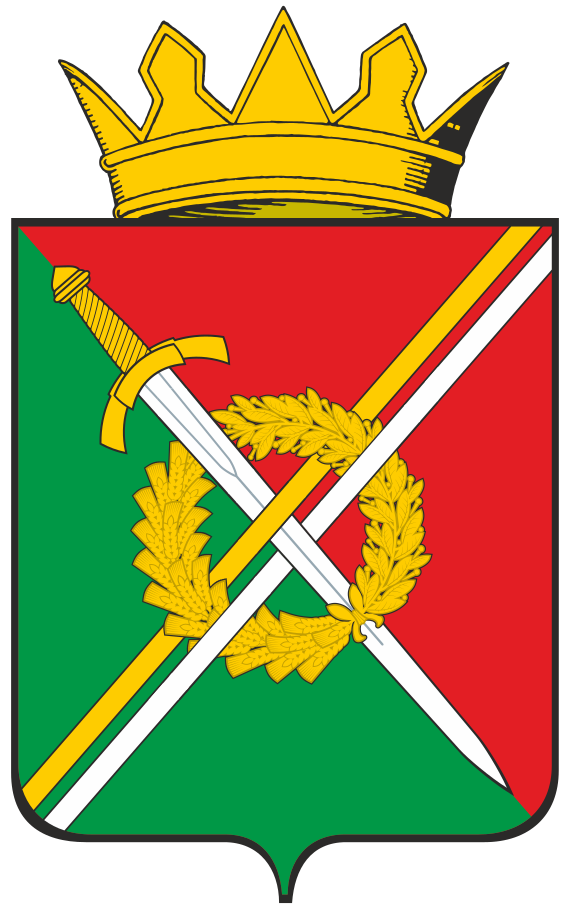
- Flag Coat of arms
- Location of Tyazhinsky District in Kemerovo Oblast
- Coordinates: 56°07′12″N 88°31′07″E
- Country: Russia
- Federal subject: Kemerovo Oblast
- Established: 1924
- Administrative center: Tyazhinsky

Area
  - Total: 3,531 km^{2} (1,363 sq mi)

Population (2010 Census)
  - Total: 25,597
  - Density: 7.249/km^{2} (18.78/sq mi)
  - Urban: 58.0%
  - Rural: 42.0%

Administrative structure
  - Administrative divisions: 2 Urban-type settlements, 10 Rural territories
  - Inhabited localities: 2 urban-type settlements, 40 rural localities

Municipal structure
  - Municipally incorporated as: Tyazhinsky Municipal District
  - Municipal divisions: 2 urban settlements, 10 rural settlements
- Time zone: UTC+7 (MSK+4)
- OKTMO ID: 32634000
- Website: https://www.tyazhin.ru/

Tyazhinsky District (Russian: Тяжи́нский райо́н) is an administrative district (raion), one of the nineteen in Kemerovo Oblast, Russia. As a municipal division, it is incorporated as Tyazhinsky Municipal District. It is located in the northeast of the oblast. The area of the district is 3,531 square kilometers (1,363 sq mi). Its administrative center is the urban locality (an urban-type settlement) of Tyazhinsky. Population: 25,597 (2010 census); 32,782 (2002 Census); 32,574 (1989 Soviet census). The population of the administrative center accounts for 43.4% of the district's total population.
