= Yashkinsky District =

Yashkinsky District Яшкинский район (Russian)
- District
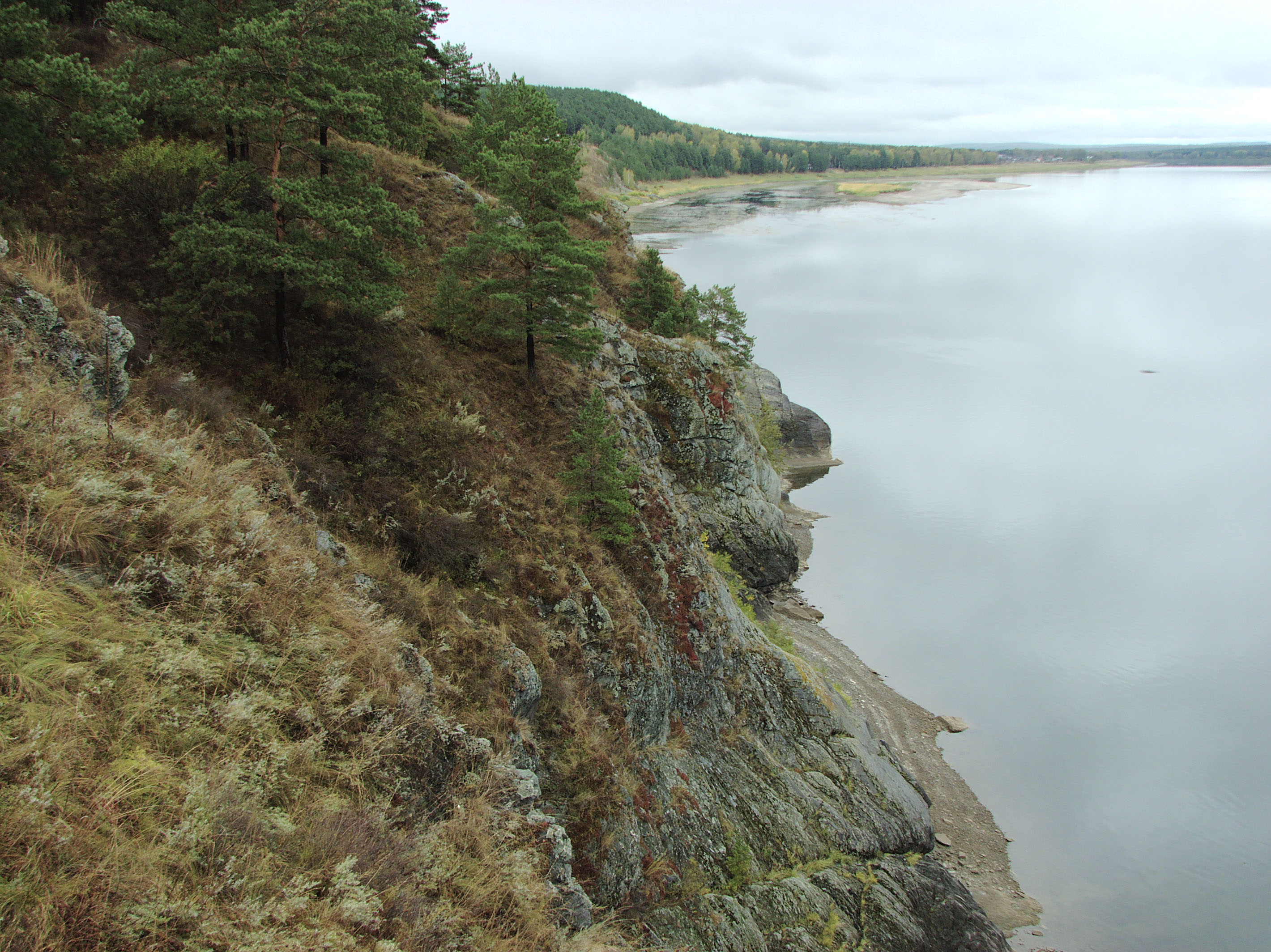
- Tom River, Yashinsky District

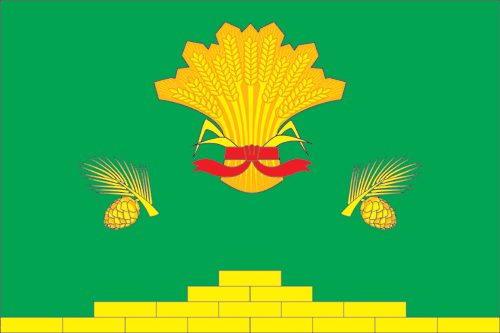
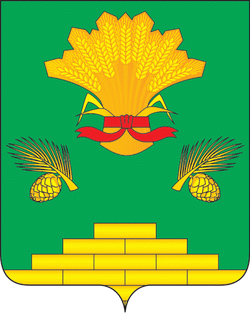
- Flag Coat of arms
- Location of Yashkinsky District in Kemerovo Oblast
- Coordinates: 55°54′N 85°24′E
- Country: Russia
- Federal subject: Kemerovo Oblast
- Administrative center: Yashkino

Area
  - Total: 3,484 km^{2} (1,345 sq mi)

Population (2010 Census)
  - Total: 30,856
  - Density: 8.856/km^{2} (22.94/sq mi)
  - Urban: 47.7%
  - Rural: 52.3%

Administrative structure
  - Administrative divisions: 1 Urban-type settlements, 10 Rural territories
  - Inhabited localities: 1 urban-type settlements, 52 rural localities

Municipal structure
  - Municipally incorporated as: Yashkinsky Municipal District
  - Municipal divisions: 1 urban settlements, 10 rural settlements
- Time zone: UTC+7 (MSK+4)
- OKTMO ID: 32546000
- Website: http://adm-rn.yashkino.ru/

Yashkinsky District (Russian: Я́шкинский райо́н) is an administrative district (raion), one of the nineteen in Kemerovo Oblast, Russia. As a municipal division, it is incorporated as Yashkinsky Municipal District. It is located in the northwest of the oblast. The area of the district is 3,484 square kilometers (1,345 sq mi). Its administrative center is the urban locality (an urban-type settlement) of Yashkino. Population: 30,856 (2010 census); 34,131 (2002 Census); 37,446 (1989 Soviet census). The population of Yashkino accounts for 47.7% of the district's total population.
