= Yaysky District =

Yaysky District Яйский район (Russian)
- District
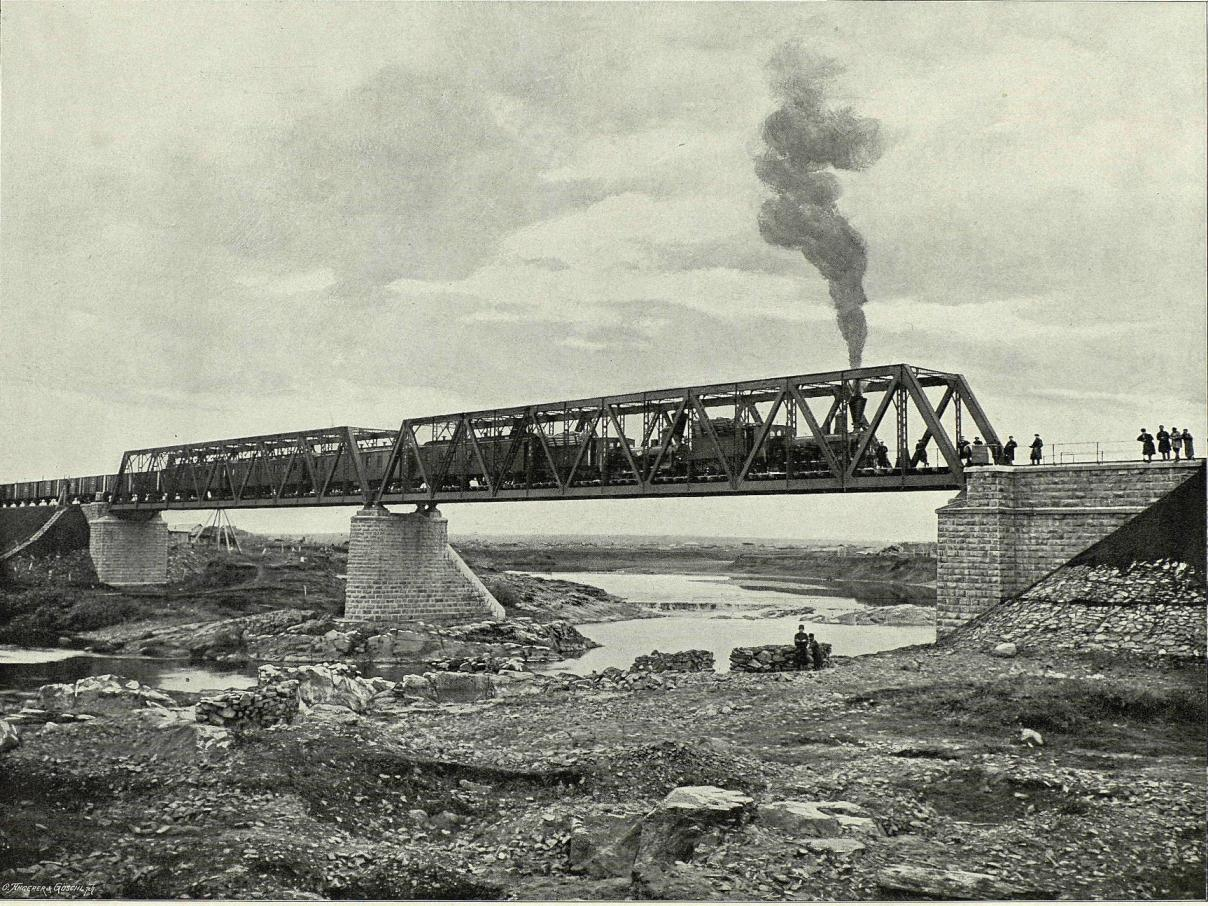
- Great Siberian Railroad, 1899, in Yaya District

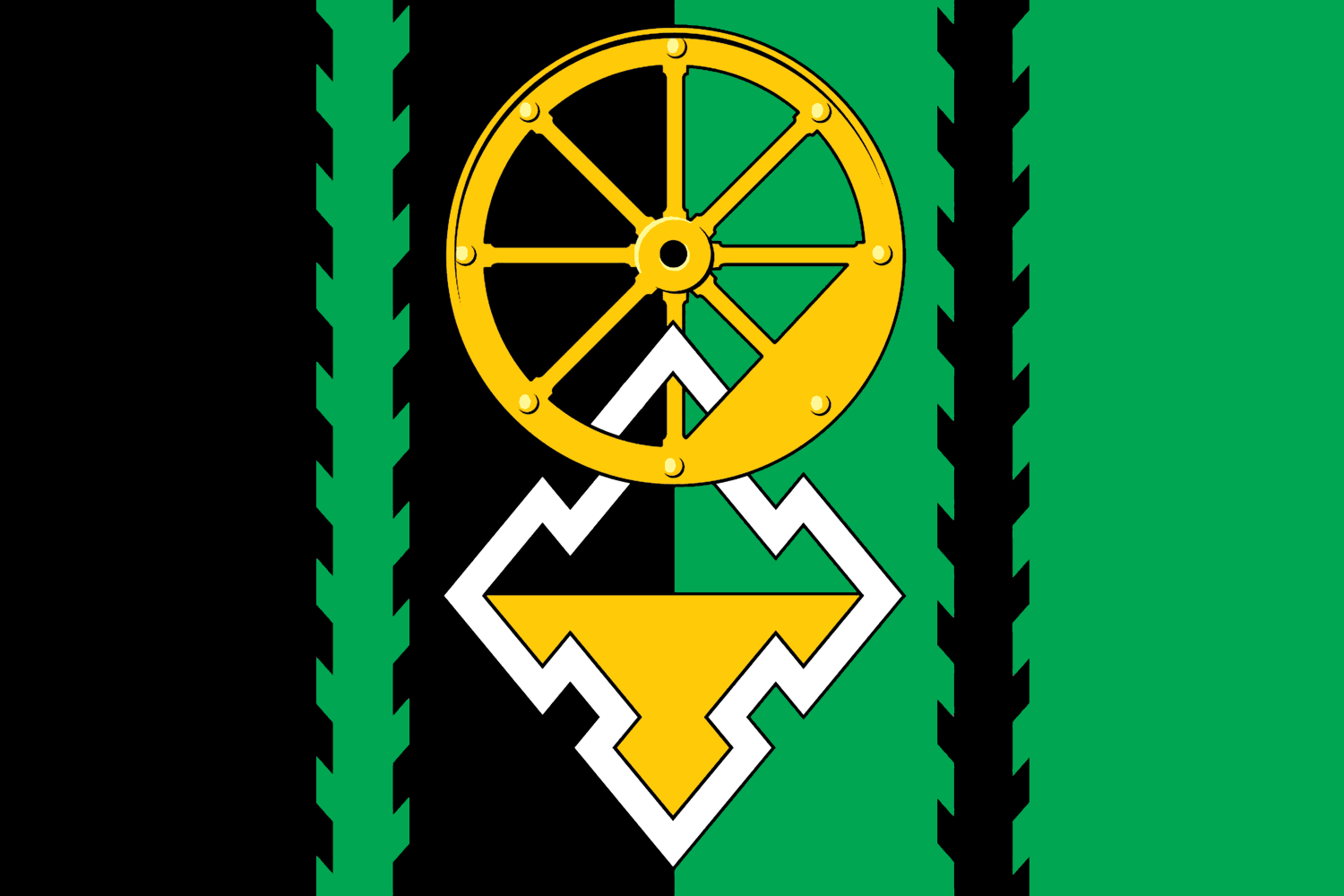
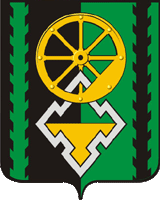
- Flag Coat of arms
- Location of Yaysky District in Kemerovo Oblast
- Coordinates: 56°12′00″N 86°26′00″E
- Country: Russia
- Federal subject: Kemerovo Oblast
- Established: 1963
- Administrative center: Yaya

Area
  - Total: 2,669 km^{2} (1,031 sq mi)

Population (2010 Census)
  - Total: 20,383
  - Density: 7.637/km^{2} (19.78/sq mi)
  - Urban: 57.3%
  - Rural: 42.7%

Administrative structure
  - Administrative divisions: 1 Urban-type settlements, 9 Rural territories
  - Inhabited localities: 1 urban-type settlements, 39 rural localities

Municipal structure
  - Municipally incorporated as: Yaysky Municipal District
  - Municipal divisions: 1 urban settlements, 9 rural settlements
- Time zone: UTC+7 (MSK+4)
- OKTMO ID: 32643000
- Website: http://adm.yayacity.ru/

Yaysky District (Russian: Яйский райо́н) is an administrative district (raion), one of the nineteen in Kemerovo Oblast, Russia. As a municipal division, it is incorporated as Yaysky Municipal District. It is located in the north of the oblast. The area of the district is 2,669 square kilometers (1,031 sq mi). Its administrative center is the urban locality (an urban-type settlement) of Yaya. Population: 20,383 (2010 census); 24,982 (2002 Census); 26,759 (1989 Soviet census). The population of Yaya accounts for 57.3% of the district's total population.
