= Anzhero-Sudzhensk =

Town in Kemerovo Oblast, Russia

Anzhero-Sudzhensk Анжеро-Судженск
- Town
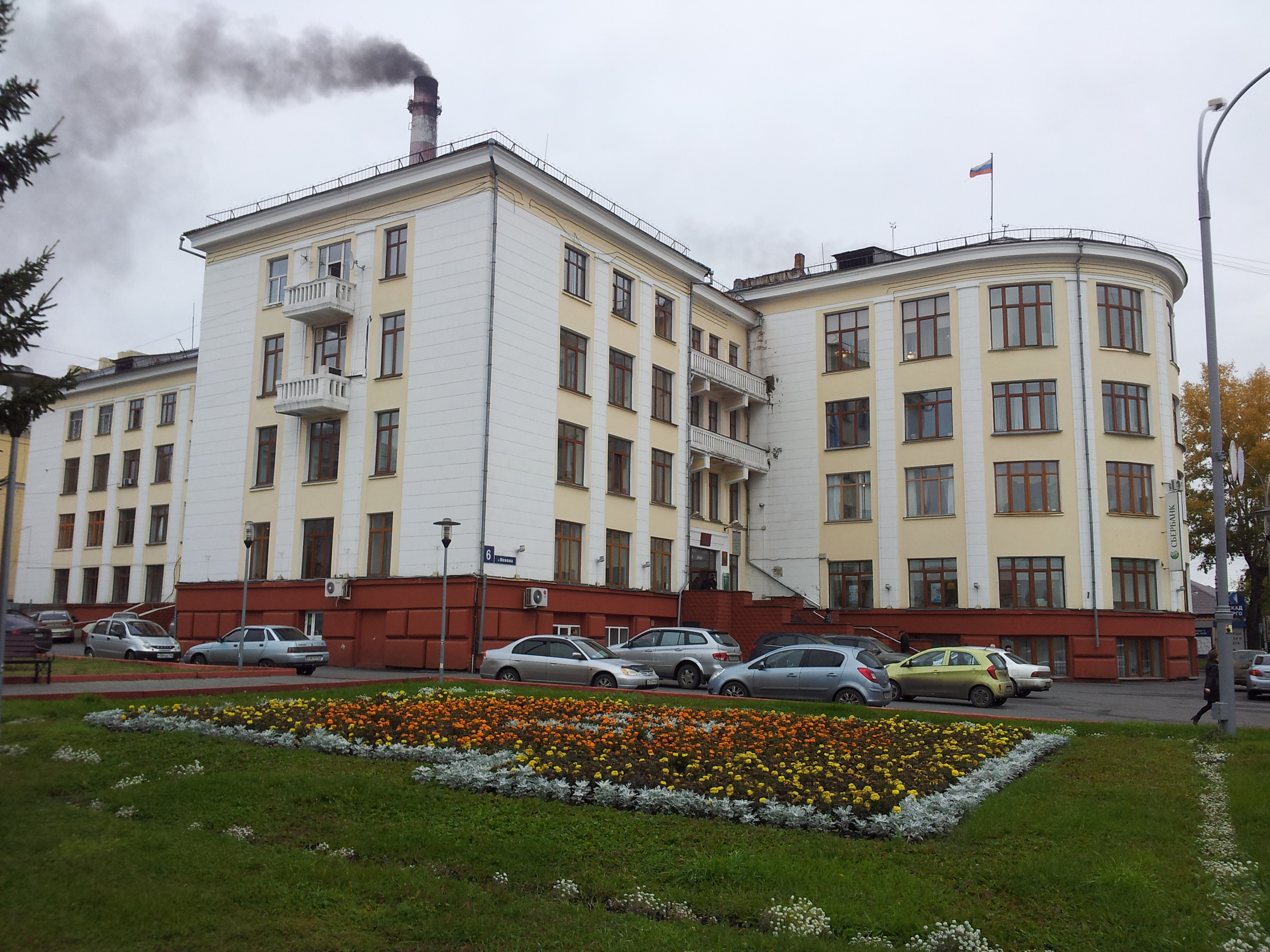
- House Councils (was a hospital during WWII), Anzhero-Sudensk

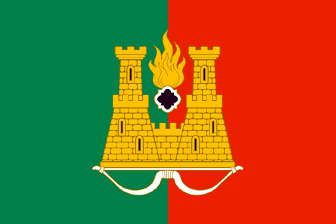
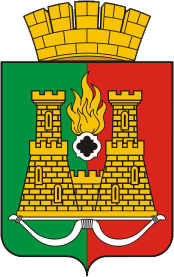
- Flag Coat of arms
- Interactive map of Anzhero-Sudzhensk
- Location of Anzhero-Sudzhensk Anzhero-Sudzhensk (Kemerovo Oblast)
- Coordinates: 56°05′N 86°02′E
- Country: Russia
- Federal subject: Kemerovo Oblast
- Founded: 1897
- Town status since: 1931
- Elevation: 230 m (750 ft)

Population (2010 Census)
  - Total: 76,646
  - Estimate (2025): 63,942 (−16.6%)
  - Rank: 214th in 2010

Administrative status
  - Subordinated to: Anzhero-Sudzhensk Town Under Oblast Jurisdiction
  - Capital of: Anzhero-Sudzhensk Town Under Oblast Jurisdiction

Municipal status
  - Urban okrug: Anzhero-Sudzhensky Urban Okrug
  - Capital of: Anzhero-Sudzhensky Urban Okrug
- Time zone: UTC+7 (MSK+4)
- Postal codes: 652470–652477, 652479, 652480, 652484, 652486, 652488, 652499
- Dialing code: +7 3845
- OKTMO ID: 32704000001
- Website: anzhero.ru

Anzhero-Sudzhensk (Russian: Анже́ро-Су́дженск) is a town in the Kuznetsk Basin in Kemerovo Oblast, Russia, located to the north of the oblast's administrative center of Kemerovo and to the east of the Tom River, on the route of the Trans-Siberian Railway. Population: 76,646 (2010 census); 86,480 (2002 census); 107,951 (1989 Soviet census).

== History ==
The town was formed by merging the settlements of Anzherka (Анжерка) and Sudzhenka (Судженка).

== Administrative and municipal status ==
Within the framework of administrative divisions, it is, together with the urban-type settlement of Rudnichny and seven rural localities, incorporated as Anzhero-Sudzhensk Town Under Oblast Jurisdiction—an administrative unit with the status equal to that of the districts. As a municipal division, Anzhero-Sudzhensk Town Under Oblast Jurisdiction is incorporated as Anzhero-Sudzhensky Urban Okrug.
