= Administrative divisions of Kemerovo Oblast =

Administrative districts of Russian federal subject

Kemerovo Oblast Russia
- Administrative centre: Kemerovo

Administrative structure (as of 2013)
- Districts: 19
- Cities/towns: 20
- Urban-type settlements: 23
- Selsovets: 164

Municipal structure (as of 2002)
- Rural settlements: 1,066 (inhabited); 25 (uninhabited)

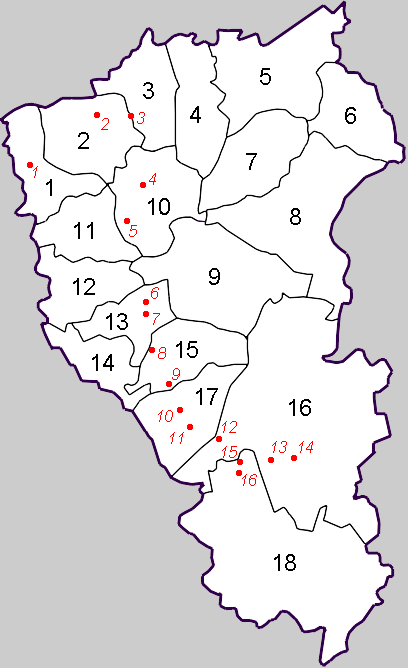
Map of Kemerovo Oblast (with numbered)

Kemerovo Oblast is a federal subject of Russia.

== Administrative and municipal divisions ==
Map

- ※ - under the oblast's jurisdiction

Division		Structure		OKATO	OKTMO	Urban-type settlement/ district-level town*	Rural (rural territory)
Division		Administrative	Municipal	OKATO	OKTMO	Urban-type settlement/ district-level town*	Rural (rural territory)
Kemerovo (Кемерово)		city	urban okrug	32 401	32 701		
↳	Kirovsky (Кировский)	(under Kemerovo)	—N/a	32 401	—N/a		
↳	Leninsky (Ленинский)	(under Kemerovo)	—N/a	32 401	—N/a		
↳	Rudnichny (Рудничный)	(under Kemerovo)	—N/a	32 401	—N/a		
↳	Tsentralny (Центральный)	(under Kemerovo)	—N/a	32 401	—N/a		
↳	Zavodsky (Заводский)	(under Kemerovo)	—N/a	32 401	—N/a		
Anzhero-Sudzhensk (Анжеро-Судженск)		city	urban okrug	32 404	32 704	Rudnichny (Рудничный)	
Belovo (Белово)		city	urban okrug	32 407	32 707	Bachatsky (Бачатский); Gramoteino (Грамотеино); Inskoy (Инской); Novy Gorodok (Новый Городок)	
Beryozovsky (Берёзовский)		city	urban okrug	32 410	32 710		
Guryevsk (Гурьевск)		city	(under Guryevsky)	32 413	32 602	Salair (Салаир) town*	
Kaltan (Калтан)		city	urban okrug	32 415	32 715		
Kiselyovsk (Киселёвск)		city	urban okrug	32 416	32 716		
Leninsk-Kuznetsky (Ленинск-Кузнецкий)		city	urban okrug	32 419	32 719		
Mariinsk (Мариинск)		city	(under Mariinsky)	32 422	32 616		
Mezhdurechensk (Междуреченск)		city	urban okrug	32 425	32 725		
Myski (Мыски)		city	urban okrug	32 438	32 728		
Novokuznetsk (Новокузнецк)		city	urban okrug	32 431	32 731		
↳	Kuybyshevsky (Куйбышевский)	(under Novokuznetsk)	—N/a	32 431	—N/a		
↳	Kuznetsky (Кузнецкий)	(under Novokuznetsk)	—N/a	32 431	—N/a		
↳	Novoilyinsky (Новоильинский)	(under Novokuznetsk)	—N/a	32 431	—N/a		
↳	Ordzhonikidzevsky (Орджоникидзевский)	(under Novokuznetsk)	—N/a	32 431	—N/a		
↳	Tsentralny (Центральный)	(under Novokuznetsk)	—N/a	32 431	—N/a		
↳	Zavodsky (Заводский)	(under Novokuznetsk)	—N/a	32 431	—N/a		
Osinniki (Осинники)		city	urban okrug	32 434	32 734		
Polysayevo (Полысаево)		city	urban okrug	32 435	32 732		
Prokopyevsk (Прокопьевск)		city	urban okrug	32 437	32 737		
↳	Rudnichny (Рудничный)	(under Prokopyevsk)	—N/a	32 437	—N/a		
↳	Tsentralny (Центральный)	(under Prokopyevsk)	—N/a	32 437	—N/a		
↳	Zenkovsky (Зенковский)	(under Prokopyevsk)	—N/a	32 437	—N/a		
Tashtagol (Таштагол)		city	(under Tashtagolsky)	32 443	32 627		
Tayga (Тайга)		city	urban okrug	32 440	32 740		
Topki (Топки)		city	(under Topkinsky)	32 446	32 631		
Yurga (Юрга)		city	urban okrug	32 449	32 749		
Krasnobrodsky (Краснобродский)		urban-type settlement※	urban okrug	32 459	32 751		
Belovsky (Беловский)		district		32 201	32 601		8
Guryevsky (Гурьевский)		district	okrug	32 202	32 602		7
Izhmorsky (Ижморский)		district	okrug	32 204	32 604	Izhmorsky (Ижморский)	6
Kemerovsky (Кемеровский)		district	okrug	32 207	32 607		9
Krapivinsky (Крапивинский)		district	okrug	32 210	32 610	Krapivinsky (Крапивинский); Zelenogorsky (Зеленогорский)	9
Leninsk-Kuznetsky (Ленинск-Кузнецкий)		district	okrug	32 213	32 613		8
Mariinsky (Мариинский)		district		32 216	32 616		12
Mezhdurechensky (Междуреченский)		district		32 217	32 617		
Novokuznetsky (Новокузнецкий)		district		32 219	32 619		16
Prokopyevsky (Прокопьевский)		district	okrug	32 222	32 622		10
Promyshlennovsky (Промышленновский)		district	okrug	32 225	32 625	Promyshlennaya (Промышленная)	10
Tashtagolsky (Таштагольский)		district		32 227	32 627	Kaz (Каз); Mundybash (Мундыбаш); Sheregesh (Шерегеш); Spassk (Спасск); Temirtau (Темиртау)	4
Tisulsky (Тисульский)		district		32 228	32 628	Belogorsk (Белогорск); Komsomolsk (Комсомольск); Tisul (Тисуль)	10
Topkinsky (Топкинский)		district		32 231	32 631		11
Tyazhinsky (Тяжинский)		district	okrug	32 234	32 634	Itatsky (Итатский); Tyazhinsky (Тяжинский)	10
Chebulinsky (Чебулинский)		district	okrug	32 237	32 637	Verkh-Chebula (Верх-Чебула)	6
Yurginsky (Юргинский)		district	okrug	32 240	32 640		9
Yashkinsky (Яшкинский)		district	okrug	32 243	32 643	Yashkino (Яшкино)	10
Yaysky (Яйский)		district	okrug	32 246	32 646	Yaya (Яя)	9
