= Prokopyevsk constituency =

Russian legislative constituency in Kemerovo Oblast

Prokopyevsk single-member constituency
- Constituency of the Russian State Duma

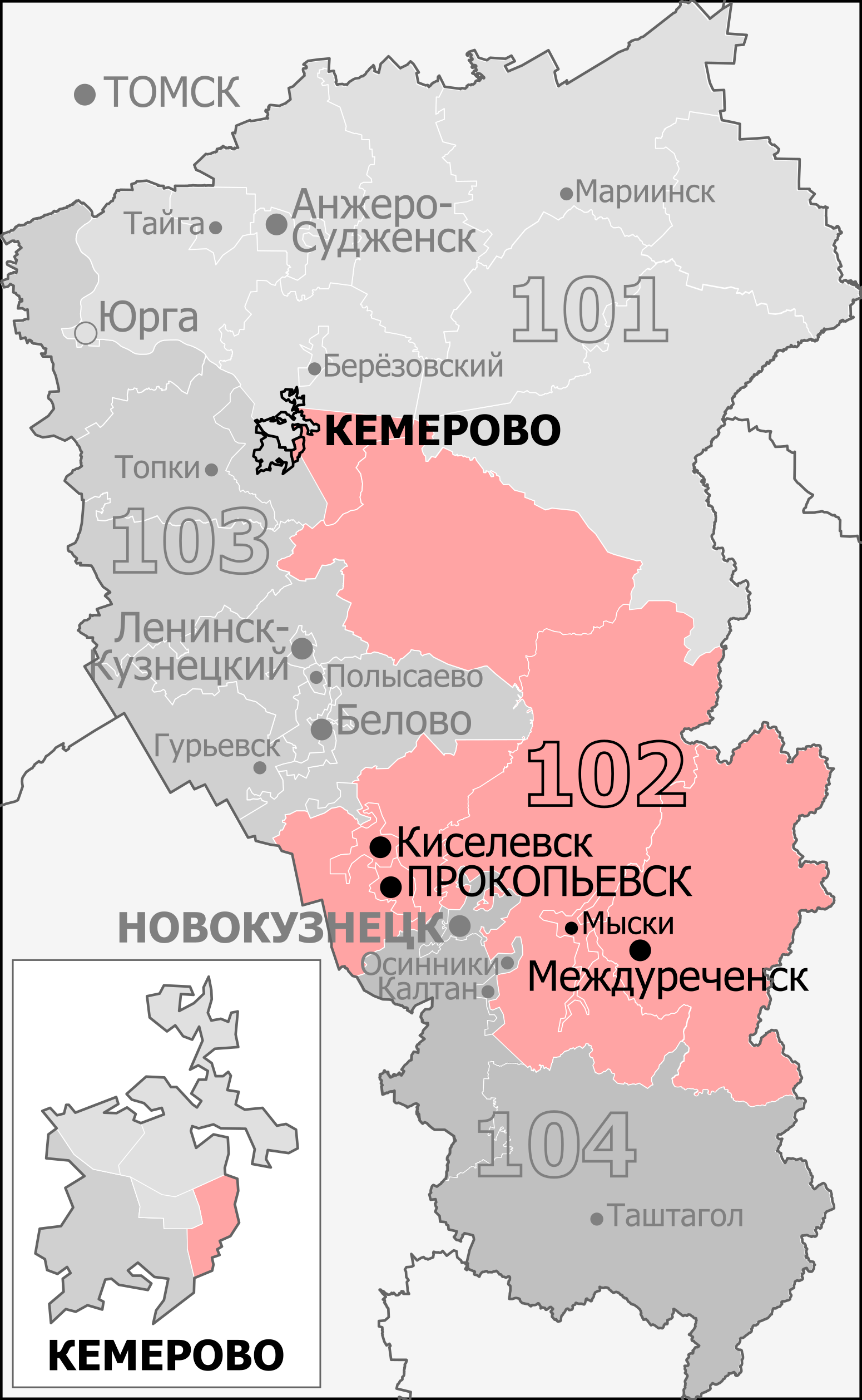
- Constituency boundaries since 2016
- Deputy: Vyacheslav Petrov; United Russia
- Federal subject: Kemerovo Oblast
- Districts: Kemerovo (Leninsky), Kemerovsky (Sukhovskoye, Yelykayevskoye), Kiselyovsk, Krapivinsky, Mezhdurechensk, Myski, Novokuznetsky (Krasulinskoye, Tersinskoye, Tsentralnoye), Prokopyevsk, Prokopyevsky
- Voters: 452,943 (2026)

The Prokopyevsk constituency (No.103 (Note: No.92 in 1993-1995 and 2003-2007, No.91 in 1995-2003, No.102 in 2016–2026)) is a Russian legislative constituency in Kemerovo Oblast. The constituency covers south-central parts of Kemerovo Oblast to the north and east of Novokuznetsk, including coal-mining centers of Prokopyevsk, Mezhdurechensk, Kiselyovsk and Myski, and stretches north up to Kemerovo, taking the city's Leninsky District residential area.

The constituency has been represented since 2026 by United Russia deputy Vyacheslav Petrov, two-term State Duma member and former Legislative Assembly of Kemerovo Oblast speaker, who won the open seat left vacant following the resignation of two-term United Russia deputy Dmitry Islamov in March 2025.

== Boundaries ==
1993–1995: Belovo, Belovsky District, Guryevsky District, Kiselyovsk, Osinniki, Prokopyevsk, Prokopyevsky District, Tashtagol
The constituency was based in southern Kemerovo Oblast and covered southern half of the Kuznetsk Basin, including the coal-mining towns of Belovo, Kiselyovsk and Prokopyevsk, towns of Osinniki and Kaltan to the south of Novokuznetsk as well as Gornaya Shoriya region. Notably the constituency was noncontiguous, as Novokuznetsk constituency split it between Prokopyevsk and Osinniki.

1995–2007: Guryevsk, Guryevsky District, Kiselyovsk, Mezhdurechensk, Myski, most of Novokuznetsky District, Prokopyevsk, Prokopyevsky District, Promyshlennovsky District, Salair, Tashtagol
After 1995 redistricting the constituency lost Belovo to Leninsk-Kuznetsky constituency and Osinniki and Kaltan to Novokuznetsk constituency. In return, the constituency was stretched north to Guryevsk and Promyshlennaya along the oblast's western border, gained most of Novokuznetsky District (making the constituency contiguous) and Mezhdurechensk in the south-east.

2016–present: Kemerovo (Leninsky), Kemerovsky District (Sukhovskoye, Yelykayevskoye), Kiselyovsk, Krapivinsky District, Mezhdurechensk, Myski, Novokuznetsky District (Krasulinskoye, Tersinskoye, Tsentralnoye), Prokopyevsk, Prokopyevsky District
The constituency was re-created for the 2016 election and in its new configuration it retained only coal-mining towns of Kiselyovsk, Mezhdurechensk, Myski and Prokopyevsk, losing Gornaya Shoriya region around Tashtagol to Novokuznetsk constituency, while Guryevsk and Promyshlennaya were placed into new Zavodsky constituency. Prokopyevsk constituency was also stretched north across taiga in central Kuzbass to oblast capital Kemerovo, taking residential Leninsky District in the city's south-east.

== Members elected ==
Election	Member	Party
1993	Nina Volkova	Independent
1995	Nina Ostanina	Independent
1999	Nina Ostanina	Communist Party
2003	Nina Ostanina	Communist Party
2007	Proportional representation - no election by constituency	
2011	Proportional representation - no election by constituency	
2016	Dmitry Islamov (Note: appointed Deputy Minister of Energy of Russia in March 2025)	United Russia
2021	Dmitry Islamov	United Russia
2026	Vyacheslav Petrov	United Russia

== Election results ==
=== 1993 ===
Summary of the 12 December 1993 Russian legislative election in the Prokopyevsk constituency
Candidate	Party	Votes	%
Nina Volkova	Independent	100,442	35.52%
Valery Biryukov	Choice of Russia	–	–
Aleksandr Sergeyev	Russian Democratic Reform Movement	–	–
Total		282,737	100%

=== 1995 ===
Summary of the 17 December 1995 Russian legislative election in the Prokopyevsk constituency
Candidate	Party	Votes	%
Nina Ostanina	Independent	148,863	45.24%
Vladimir Melnichenko	Independent	31,756	9.65%
Yevgeny Tuinov	Liberal Democratic Party	25,164	7.65%
Tatyana Ananyina	Our Home – Russia	21,765	6.61%
Sayetgali Sharipov	Party of Workers' Self-Government	20,842	6.33%
Igor Litvenenko	Independent	12,885	3.92%
Mikhail Todyshev	Revival	12,501	3.80%
Nina Volkova (incumbent)	Ivan Rybkin Bloc	12,392	3.77%
Ivan Shashviashvili	Our Future	4,400	1.34%
against all		32,644	9.92%
Total		329,074	100%

=== 1999 ===
Summary of the 19 December 1999 Russian legislative election in the Prokopyevsk constituency
Candidate	Party	Votes	%
Nina Ostanina (incumbent)	Communist Party	224,960	77.00%
Tatyana Zemlyanskikh (Khudobina)	Union of Right Forces	34,994	11.98%
Mikhail Shchadov	Andrey Nikolayev and Svyatoslav Fyodorov Bloc	5,316	1.82%
Gary Nemchenko	Our Home – Russia	4,898	1.68%
against all		18,134	6.21%
Total		292,169	100%

=== 2003 ===
Summary of the 7 December 2003 Russian legislative election in the Prokopyevsk constituency
Candidate	Party	Votes	%
Nina Ostanina (incumbent)	Communist Party	215,958	72.98%
Vladislav Balovnev	Independent	22,820	7.71%
Vladimir Ovsyannikov	Liberal Democratic Party	20,005	6.76%
Vladimir Surodin	United Russian Party Rus'	5,558	1.88%
against all		27,398	9.26%
Total		296,188	100%

=== 2016 ===
Summary of the 18 September 2016 Russian legislative election in the Prokopyevsk constituency
Candidate	Party	Votes	%
Dmitry Islamov	United Russia	350,790	77.28%
Maksim Parshukov	Liberal Democratic Party	32,786	7.22%
Vladimir Karpov	Communist Party	27,416	6.04%
Nikolay Ryzhak	A Just Russia	22,506	4.96%
Olga Bondareva	Communists of Russia	9,527	2.10%
Vitaly Ilyin	Yabloko	7,051	1.55%
Total		453,948	100%

=== 2021 ===
Summary of the 17-19 September 2021 Russian legislative election in the Prokopyevsk constituency
Candidate	Party	Votes	%
Dmitry Islamov (incumbent)	United Russia	262,941	71.11%
Ivan Utrobin	Communist Party	20,864	5.64%
Vladimir Pronin	A Just Russia — For Truth	19,586	5.30%
Kirill Pravdin	Liberal Democratic Party	17,995	4.87%
Afanasy Yeremkin	Communists of Russia	13,560	3.67%
Maksim Smirnov	New People	8,139	2.20%
Yelena Matveyeva	The Greens	7,276	1.97%
Yevgeny Zheltkevich	Party of Pensioners	5,932	1.60%
Artyom Matveyev	Rodina	4,437	1.20%
Total		369,748	100%

=== 2026 ===
Summary of the 18-20 September 2026 Russian legislative election in the Prokopyevsk constituency
Candidate	Party	Votes	%
Vyacheslav Petrov	United Russia	209,320	67.12%
Kirill Pravdin	Liberal Democratic Party	28,975	9.29%
Mikhail Boborykin	Communist Party	24,684	7.92%
Oleg Shibanov	New People	16,526	5.30%
Natalya Serikova	A Just Russia	16,224	5.20%
Gleb Alshevich	Yabloko	5,555	1.78%
Total		311,857	100%
