= Komsomolsk, Russia =

Komsomolsk (Russian: Комсомольск) is the name of several inhabited localities in Russia.

Urban localities

- Komsomolsk, Ivanovo Oblast, a town in Ivanovo Oblast
- Komsomolsk, Kemerovo Oblast, an urban-type settlement in Tisulsky District of Kemerovo Oblast

Rural localities

- Komsomolsk, Tomsk Oblast, a selo in Pervomaysky District of Tomsk Oblast
- Komsomolsk, name of several other rural localities

== See also ==
- Komsomolsk-on-Amur, a city in Khabarovsk Krai
