= Tisul =

Tisul (Russian: Тисуль) is the name of several inhabited localities in Kemerovo Oblast, Russia.

Urban localities

- Tisul, Tisulsky District, Kemerovo Oblast, an urban-type settlement in Tisulsky District

Rural localities

- Tisul, Tyazhinsky District, Kemerovo Oblast, a selo in Tisulskaya Rural Territory of Tyazhinsky District
