= Belovo, Kemerovo Oblast =

Town in Kemerovo Oblast, Russia

Belovo Белово
- Town
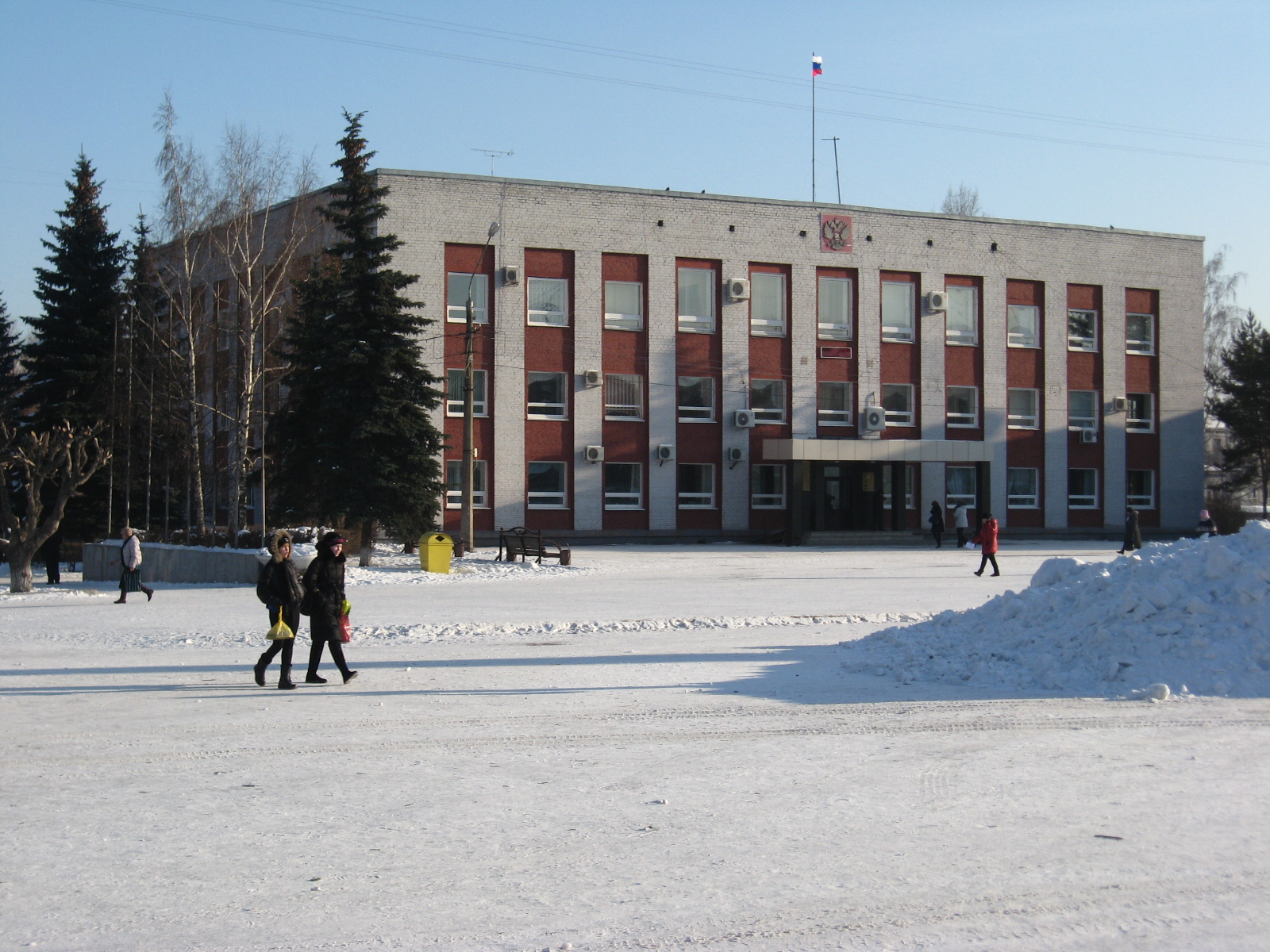
- Belovo Town Administration building

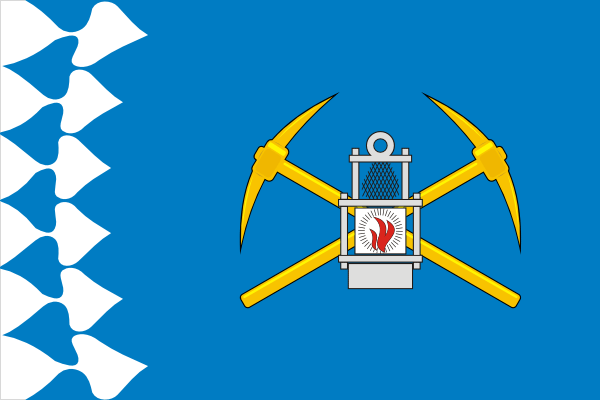
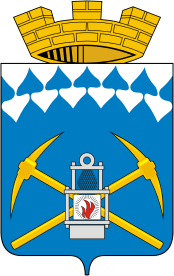
- Flag Coat of arms
- Interactive map of Belovo
- Location of Belovo Belovo (Kemerovo Oblast)
- Coordinates: 54°25′N 86°18′E
- Country: Russia
- Federal subject: Kemerovo Oblast
- Known since: 1726
- Town status since: 1938
- Elevation: 223 m (732 ft)

Population (2010 Census)
  - Total: 76,764
  - Estimate (2025): 66,862 (−12.9%)
  - Rank: 212th in 2010

Administrative status
  - Subordinated to: Belovo Town Under Oblast Jurisdiction
  - Capital of: Belovsky District, Belovo Town Under Oblast Jurisdiction

Municipal status
  - Urban okrug: Belovsky Urban Okrug
  - Capital of: Belovsky Urban Okrug, Belovsky Municipal District
- Time zone: UTC+7 (MSK+4)
- Postal codes: 652600, 652602, 652603, 652607, 652612, 652614–652619, 652632, 652699
- Dialing code: +7 38452
- OKTMO ID: 32707000001
- Website: www.belovo42.ru

Belovo (Russian: Белово) is a town in Kemerovo Oblast, Russia, located on the Bachat River 170 kilometers (110 mi) south of Kemerovo. Population: 76,764 (2010 census); 82,425 (2002 census); 93,108 (1989 Soviet census).

== History ==
The village of Belovo for the first time is mentioned in 1726. It was named after a fugitive peasant Fyodor Belov, who built a small taiga house, a so-called zaimka, on the bank of the Bachat River. The year of 1855 was a new page in the history of settlement: the mining of mineral resources on the found coal field began. In 1938, Belovo was granted town status. The town developed as a conglomeration of departmental settlements, whose population was directly or indirectly involved with the coal mines, a power station, and the railway.

== Administrative and municipal status ==
Within the framework of administrative divisions, Belovo serves as the administrative center of Belovsky District, even though it is not a part of it. As an administrative division, it is, together with four urban-type settlements (Bachatsky, Gramoteino, Inskoy, and Novy Gorodok) and two rural localities, incorporated separately as Belovo Town Under Oblast Jurisdiction—an administrative unit with the status equal to that of the districts. As a municipal division, Belovo Town Under Oblast Jurisdiction is incorporated as Belovsky Urban Okrug.

== Government ==
The town is governed by the Council of the People's Deputies, which consists of five committees, the Head of Town, Town Administration, and structural divisions.

== Economy ==
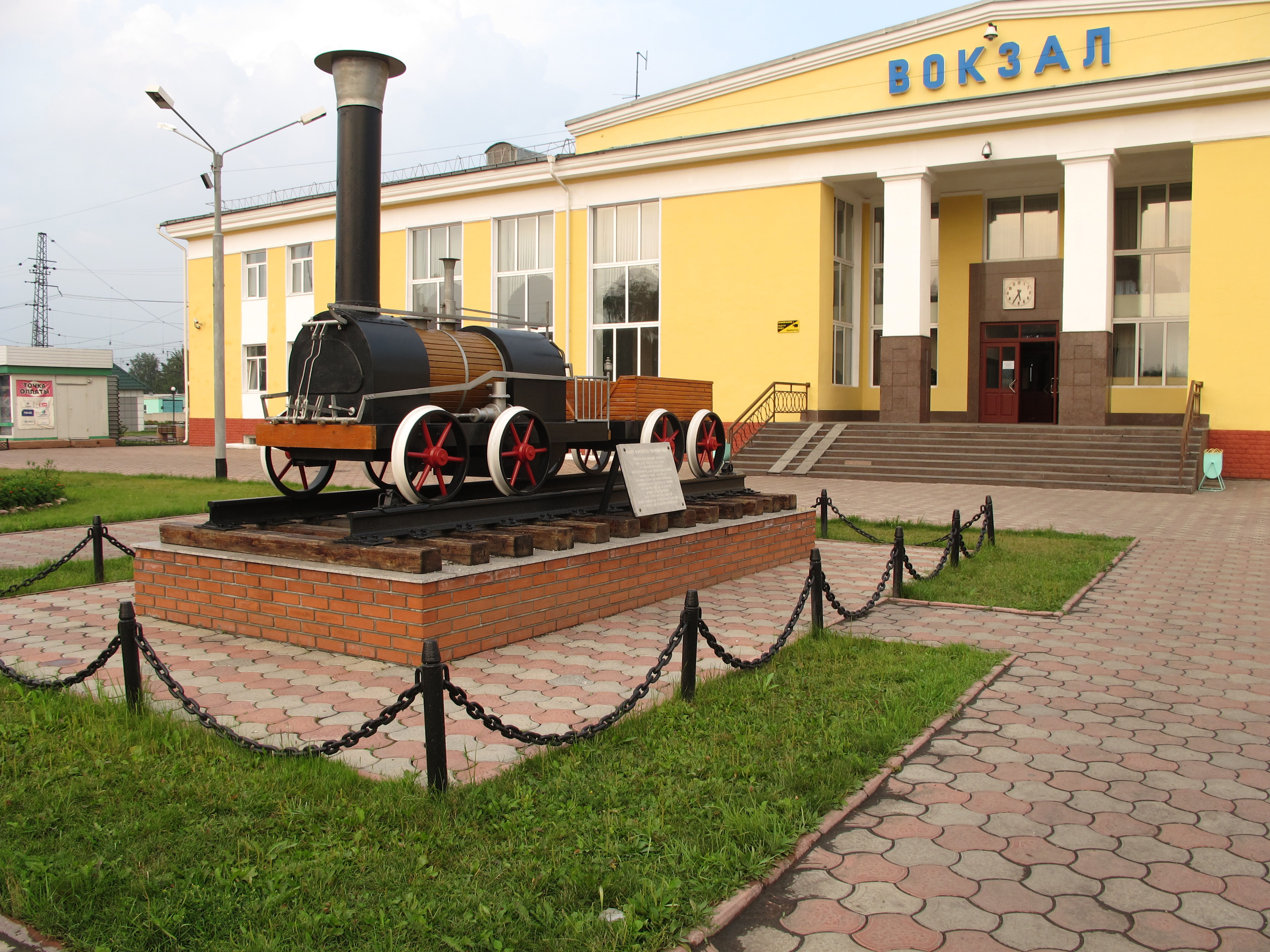
Belovo railway station (1964-2014)

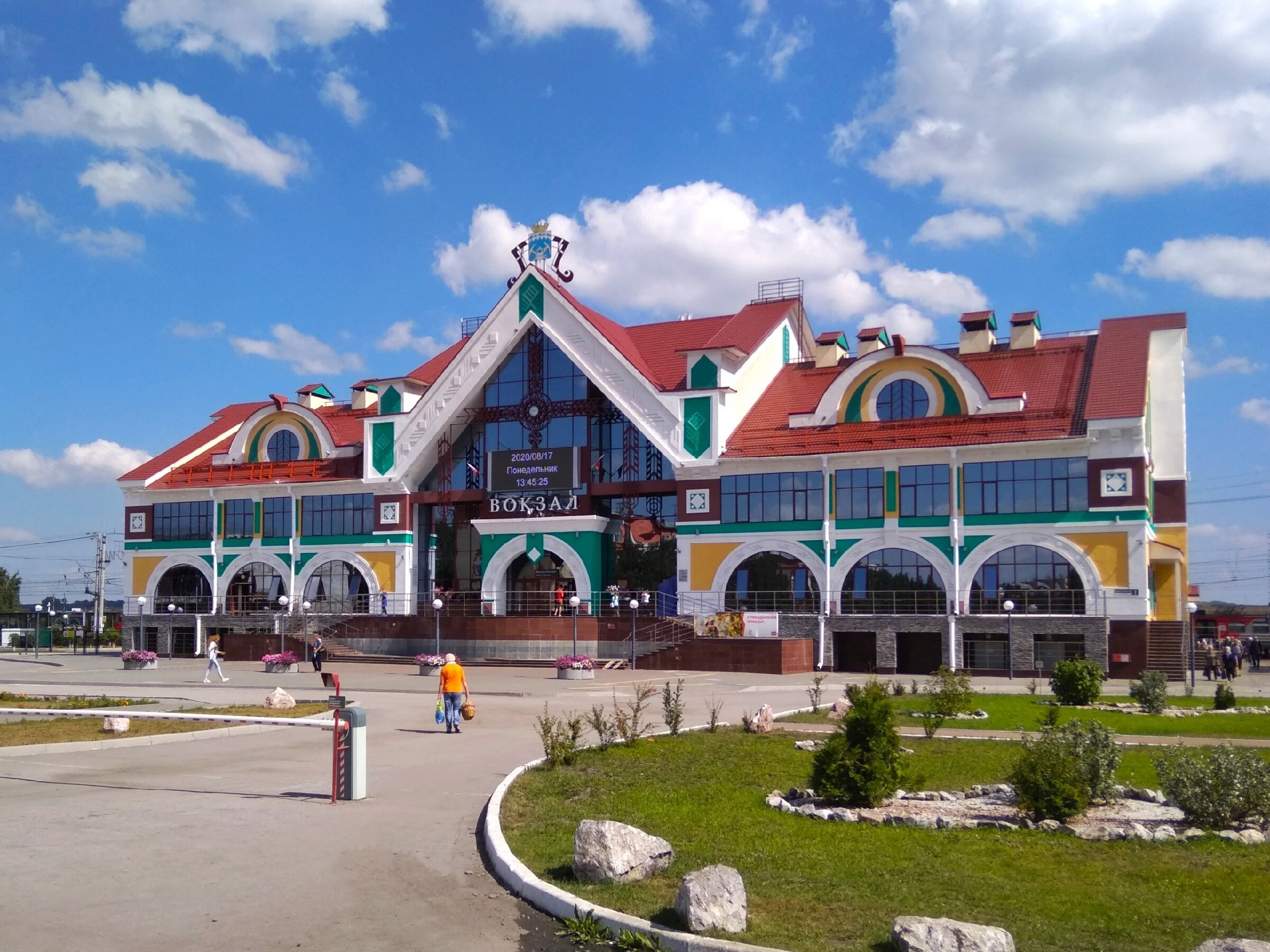
Belovo railway station (2016-2023)

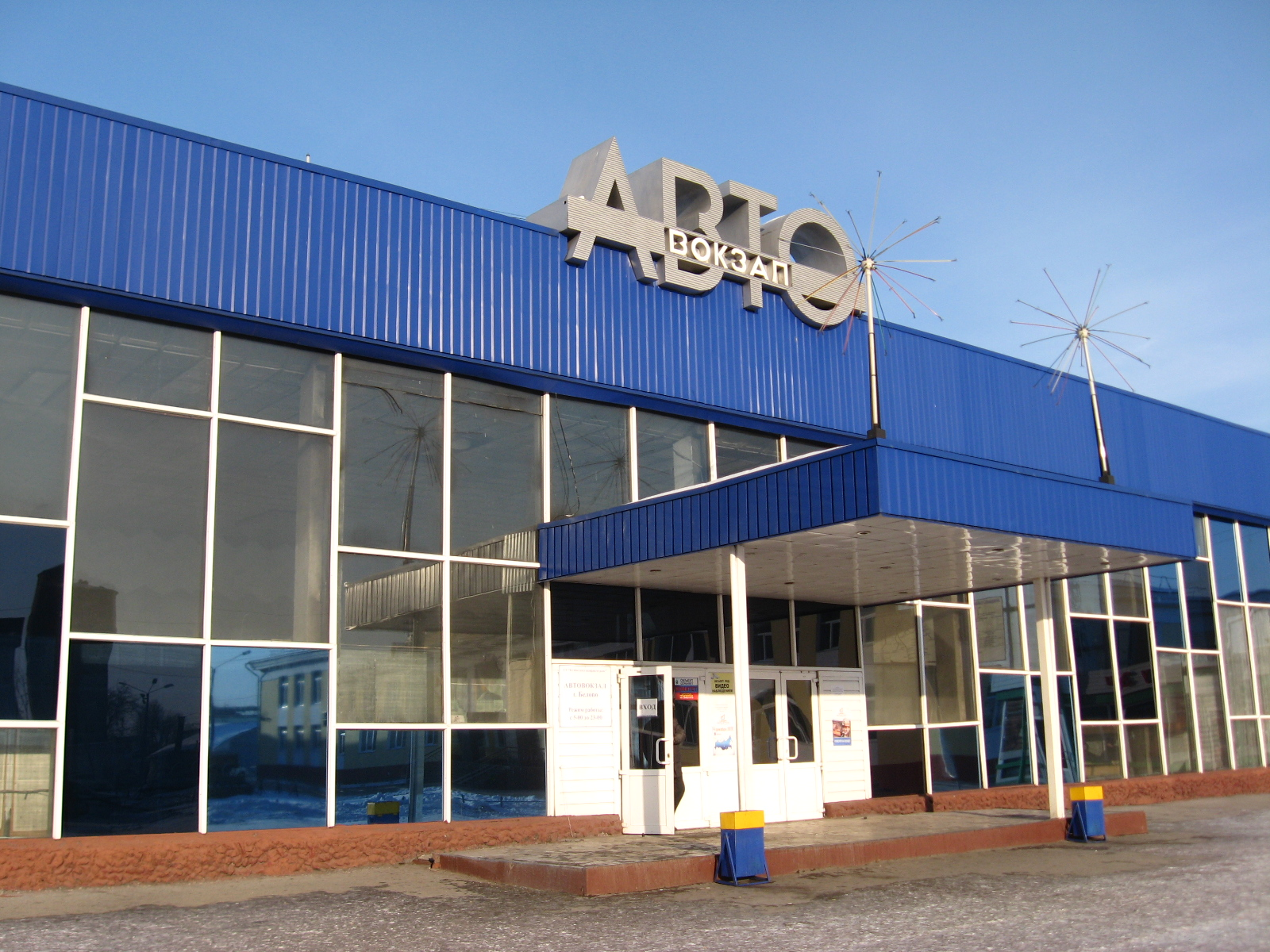
Belovo bus station (1975-2012)

Belovo is the important transport unit of Kuzbass: it is situated approximately on the halfway between regional center Kemerovo and the city of Novokuznetsk and is connected with them by railway and highway of republican value «Kemerovo - Mezhdurechensk». 18% of all Kuzbass coal is mined at Belovo. By the volume of extracted coal the city is a stable member of three leaders together with Novokuznetsk and Mezhdurechensk. 63% of industrial outputs of the city are due to coal extraction, which is performed at 4 open pits and 5 underground mines. The largest in Russia the open-cast «Bachatskii» has marked its 60th anniversary in 2009. Four thousand people work at it. The open-cast exports its production to CIS countries as well as to other foreign countries. More than 6.5 thousand people work at Belovo mines. Belovo district power station produces one third of electric power of Kuzbass. Such unique companies, as «Belovo zinc plant», JSC and «Sibelcom», JSC (the monopolist in Russia to produce switching stuff), work in Belovo area. Other firms of the city, such as «Belovo machine works», JSC, «Belovo energoremontnyi zavod», JSC; «Belovo СЕММ», JSC, etc. should be mentioned.

The economical outlooks of Belovo first of all depend on development of its coal firms and concomitant industry.

== Social sphere ==
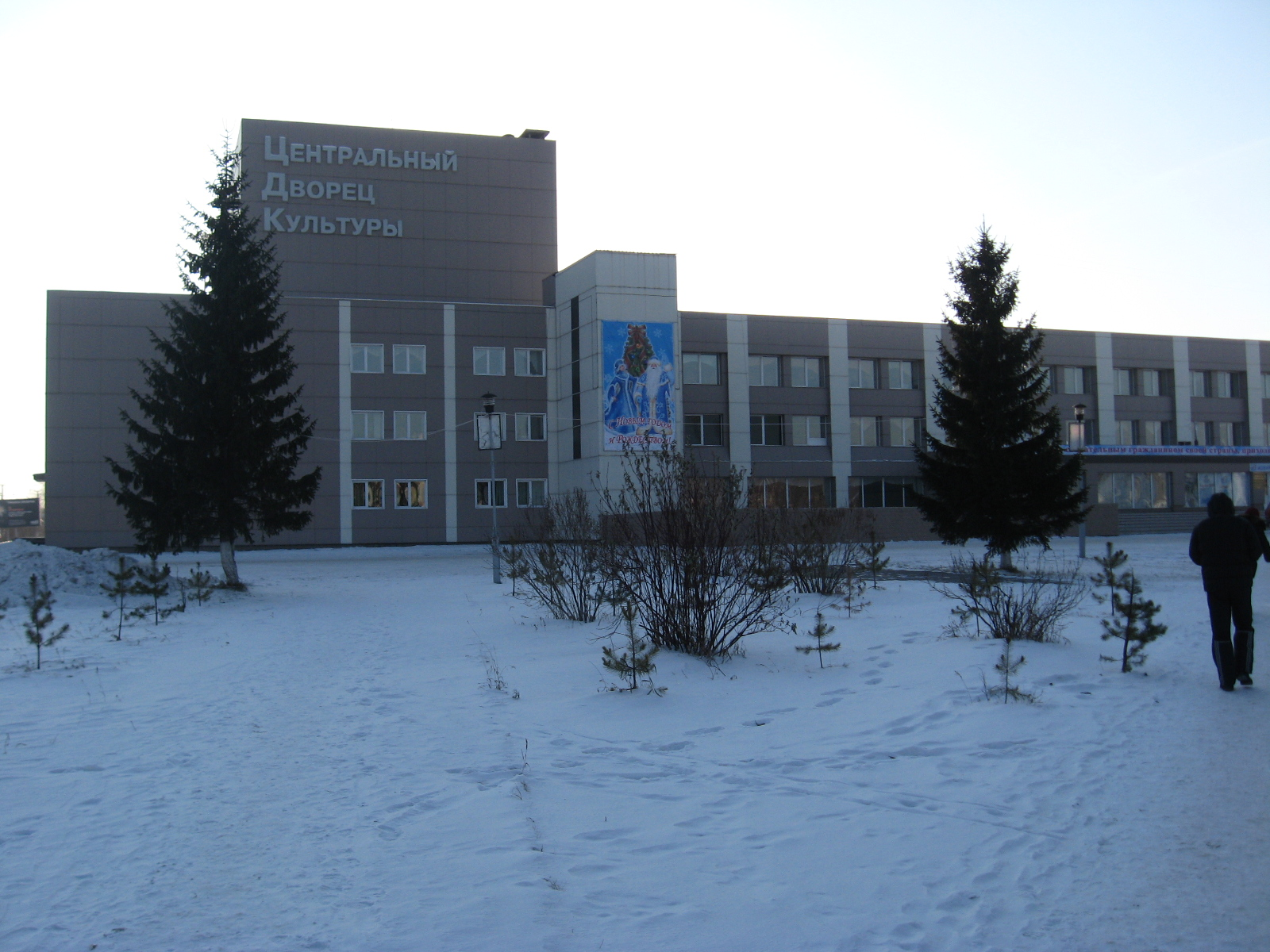
Central Palace of Culture

Medical care to the population of the city is rendered by 27 medical entities. There are 25 libraries in Belovo, 3 Art Schools, 8 Musical Schools, 3 Cinemas, 16 clubs and Houses of Culture, Exhibition Hall and Local Park. There also 8 Stadiums and 60 Sporting halls, Chess club, House of sports. There are also social asylum for children and adolescents, social - rehabilitation center for minors.

== Education ==
Consequentially, due to the proximity of the city to the operational coalfields, a group of settlements in the huge terrain have defined a large number of objects of the social sphere (more than 240 entities). Among them - 41 secondary schools and 5 evening schools, 34 preschool entities, palace of creativity of Children and Youth, б professional schools, medical school, pedagogical and polytechnic colleges, Belovo branch of Kemerovo State University, branches of the Kuzbass Technical University, Tomsk University of Architecture and Building, Tomsk Polytechnic University.

== Notable people ==
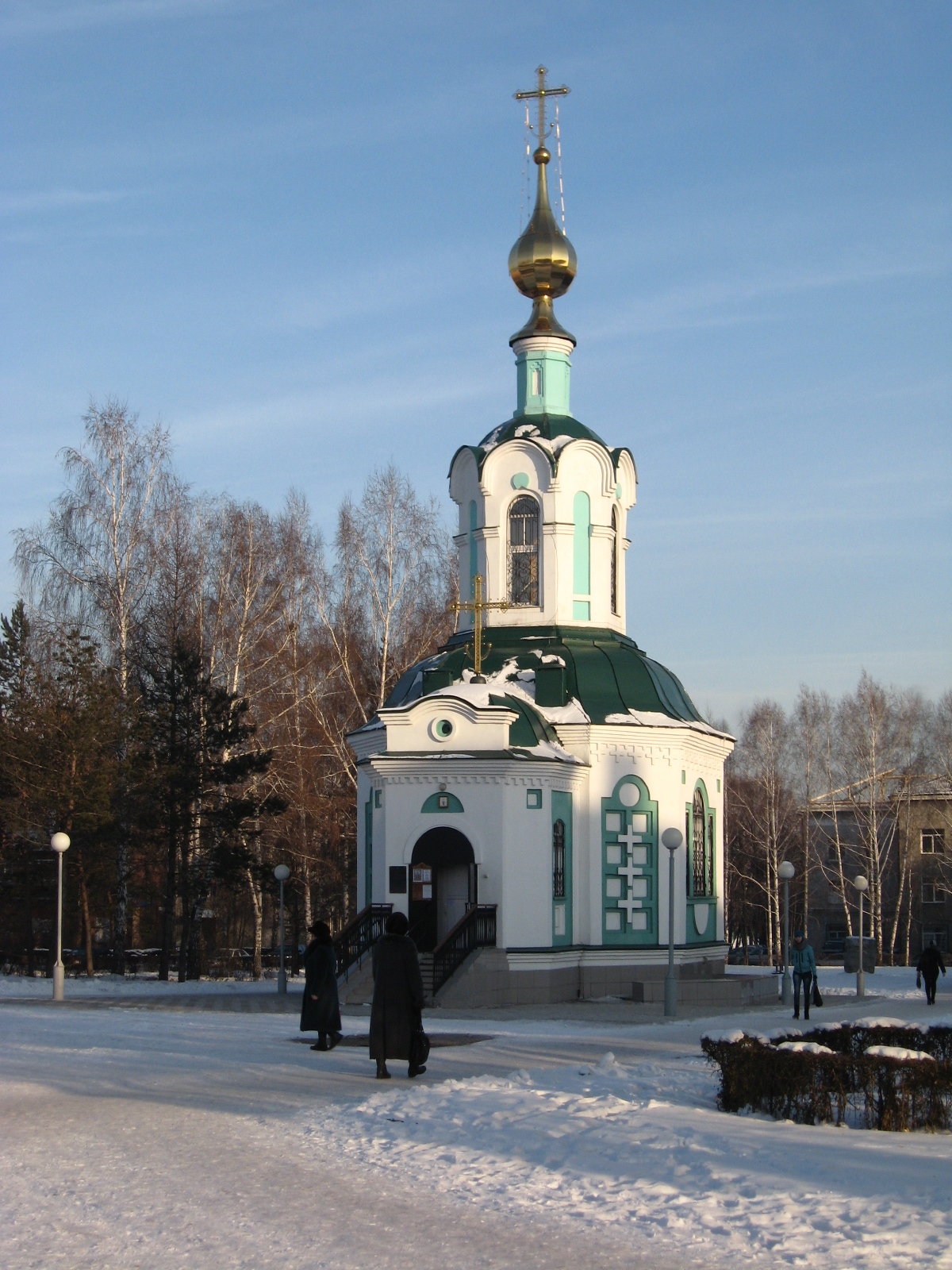
Chapel of the Intercession of the Mother

The rank of the "honorary citizen" was established in 1999 by the Council of the People's Deputies. As of 2012, three people have been awarded this rank.

Other notable people include:

- Gennady Mesyats, physicist
- Yevgeny Petrov, Olympic cyclist
- Yevgeny Rybakov, long-distance runner
