= Tashtagolsky =

Tashtagolsky (masculine), Tashtagolskaya (feminine), or Tashtagolskoye (neuter) may refer to:

- Tashtagolsky District, a district of Kemerovo Oblast, Russia
- Tashtagolskoye Urban Settlement, a municipal formation within Tashtagolsky Municipal District which Tashtagol Town Under Oblast Jurisdiction in Kemerovo Oblast, Russia is incorporated as
