= Chebulinsky District =

Chebulinsky District Чебулинский район (Russian)
- District
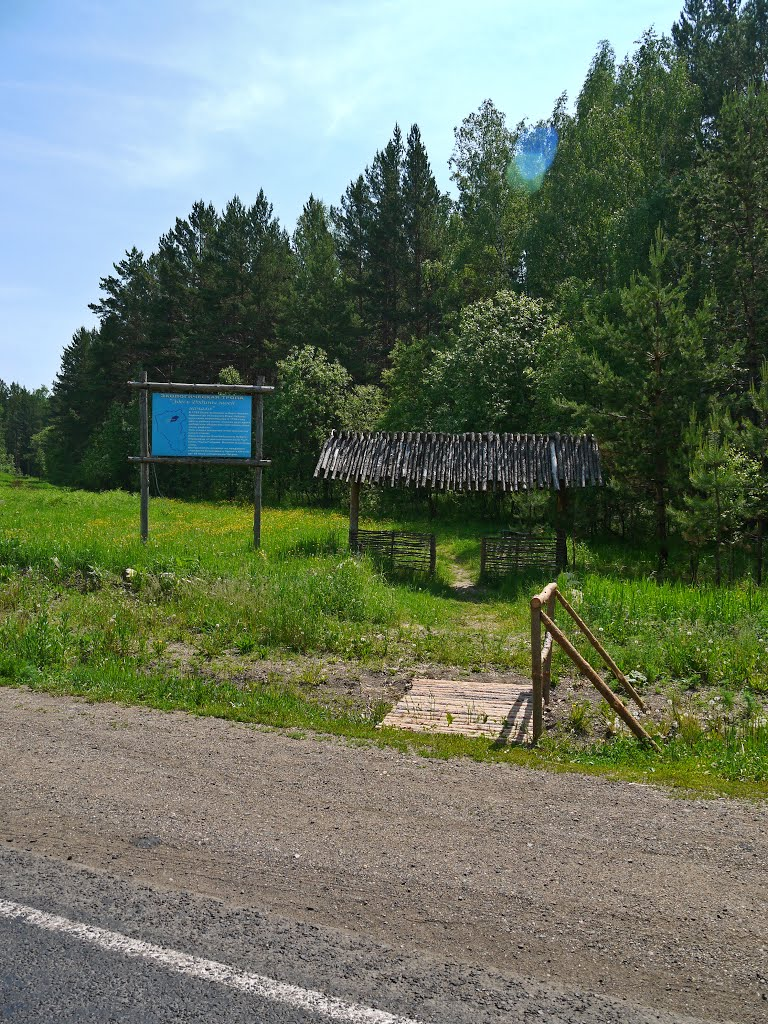
- Nature Trail near Verkh Chebula

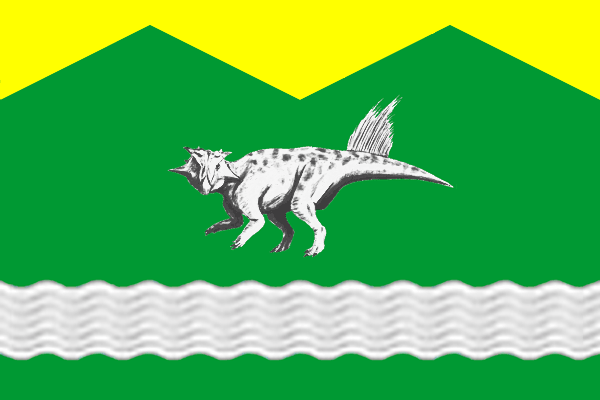
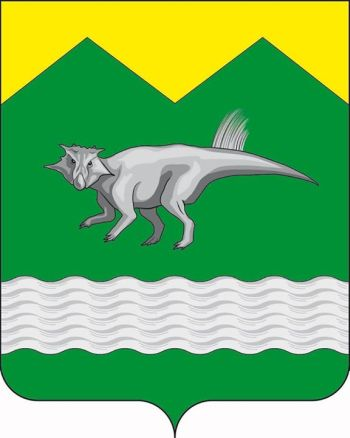
- Flag Coat of arms
- Location of Chebulinsky District in Kemerovo Oblast
- Coordinates: 56°02′24″N 87°37′12″E
- Country: Russia
- Federal subject: Kemerovo Oblast
- Established: 1924
- Administrative center: Verkh-Chebula

Area
  - Total: 3,700 km^{2} (1,400 sq mi)

Population (2010 Census)
  - Total: 16,348
  - Density: 4.4/km^{2} (11/sq mi)
  - Urban: 31.0%
  - Rural: 69.0%

Administrative structure
  - Administrative divisions: 1 Urban-type settlements, 6 Rural territories
  - Inhabited localities: 1 urban-type settlements, 28 rural localities

Municipal structure
  - Municipally incorporated as: Chebulinsky Municipal District
  - Municipal divisions: 1 urban settlements, 6 rural settlements
- Time zone: UTC+7 (MSK+4)
- OKTMO ID: 32637000
- Website: http://www.ako.ru/chebula/

Chebulinsky District (Russian: Чебули́нский райо́н) is an administrative district (raion), one of the nineteen in Kemerovo Oblast, Russia. As a municipal division, it is incorporated as Chebulinsky Municipal District. It is located in the north of the oblast. The area of the district is 3,780 square kilometers (1,460 sq mi). Its administrative center is the urban locality (an urban-type settlement) of Verkh-Chebula. Population: 16,348 (2010 census); 17,971 (2002 Census); 17,723 (1989 Soviet census). The population of Verkh-Chebula accounts for 31.0% of the district's total population.

== Geography ==
Chebulinsky District is about 40 km northeast of the City of Kemerovo, in the Chebuly Basin, for which the district is named. It is located just to the west of the Kuznetsk Alatau mountains. The Kiya River flows down from the mountains on its way north through the eastern border of the district. The district is known as the discovery site of many early Cretaceous dinosaur skeletons, including Psittacosaurus sibiricus. The area also features a wetland complex important to rare birds ("Shestakovo Swamp"), two extinct volcanos, and over 50 Paleolithic to Middle Aged archaeological sites.

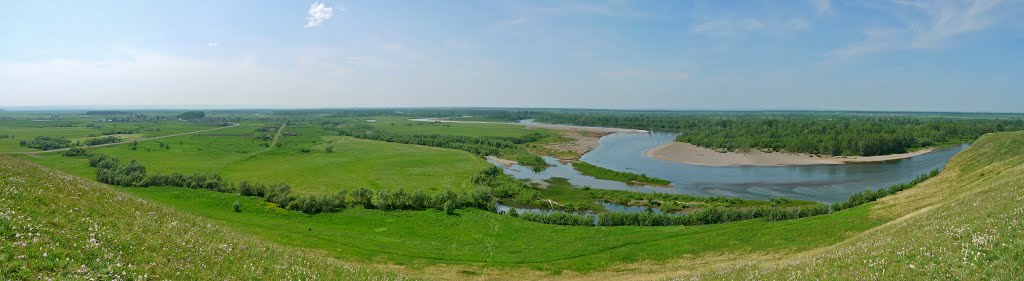
Kiya River near Shestakovo, Chebulinsky District

Vegetation in the area is steppe and mountain forest-steppe. The forested areas are scattered. The district is about 100 km long, oriented towards the northeast. The road from Kemerovo to Krasnoyarsk in the east runs through the northern edge of the District. Subdivisions of the district include 1 urban area, and 7 rural settlements.

Chebulinsky District borders with Mariinsky District to the north, Tisulsky District in the east and south, and with Kemerovsky District to the west.

== Economy ==
Chebulinsky is an agricultural district, with production and processing of grains, livestock and dairy products.
