= Belogorsk =

Belogorsk or Bilohirsk (Russian: Белогорск; Ukrainian: Білогірськ) is the name of several inhabited localities in Russia and Ukraine.

Urban localities

- Belogorsk, Amur Oblast, a town in Amur Oblast in Russia; administratively incorporated as an urban okrug
- Bilohirsk (Crimea) in Ukraine
- Belogorsk, Kemerovo Oblast, an urban-type settlement in Tisulsky District of Kemerovo Oblast in Russia

Rural localities

- Belogorsk, Irkutsk Oblast, a settlement in Usolsky District of Irkutsk Oblast in Russia
