= Der Rote Bergmann =

- October 25, 1933 issue of Der Rote Bergmann
- Editor: Rodovski, Ludwig Karas
- Founded: March 10, 1933
- Ceased publication: 1935
- Political alignment: Communist
- Language: German language
- City: Prokopyevsk
- Country: Soviet Union

Der Rote Bergmann ('The Red Mine Worker') was a German language newspaper published from Prokopyevsk (West Siberian Krai), the Soviet Union between 1933 and 1935. The newspaper was an organ of the Prokopyevsk City Committee of the All-Union Communist Party (Bolsheviks) and the Coal Miners Union. The first issue was published on March 10, 1933.

DerRote Bergmann had a readership among German-speaking workers in the Kuznetsk Basin (Kuzbass) coal mining area, especially among Reichsdeutsche (i.e. recent immigrants from Germany). The editors of the newspaper were Rodovski and Ludwig Karas. The most frequently quoted correspondent of the newspaper was the worker F. Frießen. The newspaper had a largely industrial character, carrying reports on mining industry in the Kuzbass and on the udarniks (shock workers).

Copies of the newspaper had two pages. It was printed in some 500 copies per issue. All in all, around 126 issues of the newspaper were published.
