= Snezhinsky =

Snezhinsky (masculine), Snezhinskaya (feminine), or Snezhinskoye (neuter) may refer to:

- Snezhinsky Urban Okrug, a municipal formation, which the town of Snezhinsk, Chelyabinsk Oblast, Russia, is incorporated as
- Snezhinsky (rural locality) (Snezhinskaya, Snezhinskoye), name of several rural localities in Russia
