= Kemerovsky =

Kemerovsky (masculine), Kemerovskaya (feminine), or Kemerovskoye (neuter) may refer to:

- Kemerovsky District, a district of Kemerovo Oblast, Russia
- Kemerovsky Urban Okrug, a municipal formation of Kemerovo Oblast, which the city of Kemerovo is incorporated as
- Kemerovo Oblast (Kemerovskaya oblast), a federal subject of Russia
