= Vadim Larionov =

Russian association football player

Personal information
- Full name: Vadim Vyacheslavovich Larionov
- Date of birth: 22 October 1996 (age 30)
- Place of birth: Bachatsky, Russia
- Height: 1.83 m (6 ft 0 in)
- Position: Forward

Youth career
- 2012–2014: UOR Leninsk-Kuznetsky
- 2014–2015: CSKA Moscow

Senior career*
Years	Team	Apps	(Gls)
2012–2014	FC UOR Leninsk-Kuznetsky	12	(0)
2014–2015	PFC CSKA Moscow	0	(0)
2015	→ Sibir-2 Novosibirsk (loan)	3	(0)
2015	Novokuznetsk	12	(1)
2016–2017	Irtysh Omsk	26	(6)
2017–2019	Dolgoprudny	43	(15)
2019	Minsk	2	(0)
- * Club domestic league appearances and goals as of 31 December 2019

Vadim Vyacheslavovich Larionov (Russian: Вадим Вячеславович Ларионов; born 22 October 1996) is a Russian former football player.

== Club career ==
He made his debut in the Russian Professional Football League for FC Sibir-2 Novosibirsk on 22 April 2015 in a game against FC Metallurg Novokuznetsk.
