= Spassk, Kemerovo Oblast =

Spassk Спасск
- Urban-type settlement
- Interactive map of Spassk
- Location of Spassk Spassk (Kemerovo Oblast)
- Coordinates: 52.7482°N 87.7545°E
- Country: Russia
- Federal subject: Kemerovo Oblast
- Administrative district: Tashtagolsky District
- Founded: 1845
- Elevation: 460 m (1,510 ft)

Population (2010 Census)
  - Total: 1,703
  - Estimate (2025): 1,513 (−11.2%)
- Time zone: UTC+7 (MSK+4)
- Postal code: 652980
- OKTMO ID: 32627162051

Spassk (Russian: Спасск) is an urban locality (an urban-type settlement) in Tashtagolsky District of Kemerovo Oblast, Russia. Population: 1,703 (2010 census); 1,596 (2002 census); 1,661 (1989 Soviet census).
