= Sheregesh =

Sheregesh Шерегеш
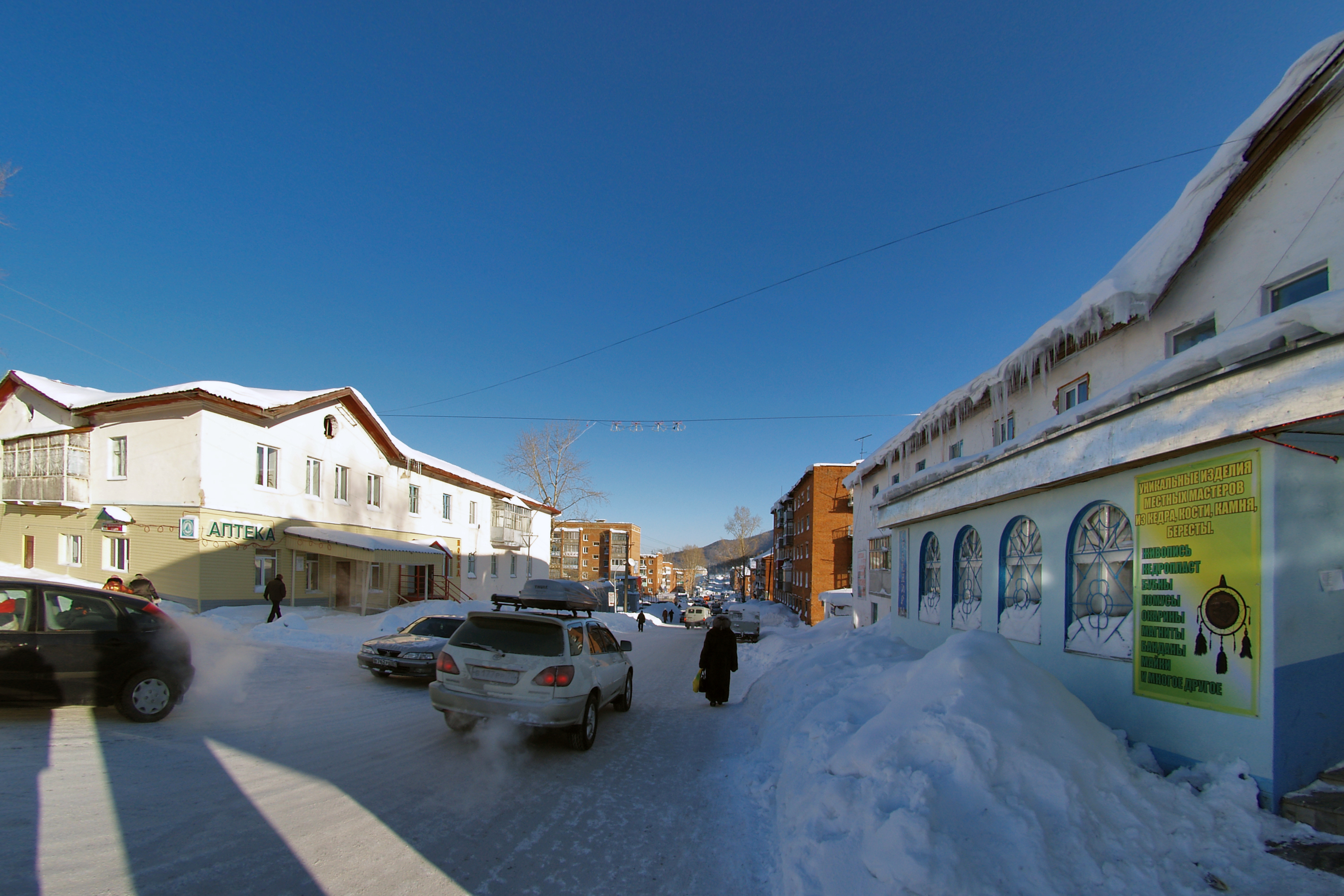

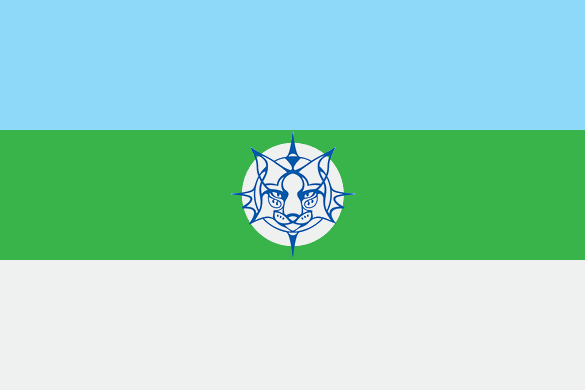
- Flag
- Interactive map of Sheregesh
- Location of Sheregesh Sheregesh (Kemerovo Oblast)
- Coordinates: 52°55′30″N 88°02′00″E
- Country: Russia
- Federal subject: Kemerovo Oblast
- Founded: 1914
- Elevation: 789 m (2,589 ft)

Population
  - Estimate (2025): 9,666 )
- Time zone: UTC+7 (MSK+4)
- Postal code: 652971
- OKTMO ID: 32627175051

Sheregesh (Russian: Шерегеш, Shor: Шерегеш, romanized: Şeregeş) is an urban locality (an urban-type settlement) in Tashtagolsky District of Kemerovo Oblast, Russia. Population: 10,173 (2010 census); 10,371 (2002 census); 9,553 (1989 Soviet census). Postal code: 652971. The main ethnic groups are Russians and Shors.

== History and economy ==
Sheregesh is named after brothers Sheregeshevy, who struck iron ore in 1912.

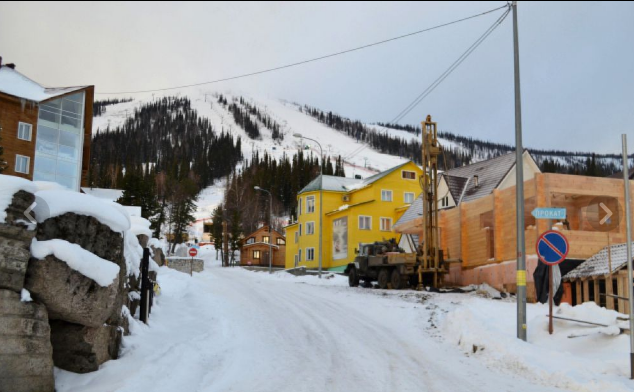
The Sheregesh ski resort at Mount Zelenaya

== Ski resort ==
Since the early 2000s Sheregesh is known as a ski resort and is continuously developing.

As of 2018, 19 ski lifts operate in Sheregesh ski resort, open from 9 to 17. Since 2015 lift pass for use on all ski lifts is available.

=== Grelka fest ===
In April, the main event of Sheregesh, the music festival "Grelka Fest", traditionally takes place, where every year skiers in swimsuits simultaneously descend from the mountain.

== Weather ==
The climate of Sheregesh is continental: winters are usually cold and snowy; summers are short and warm. The snow mantle reaches four meters.

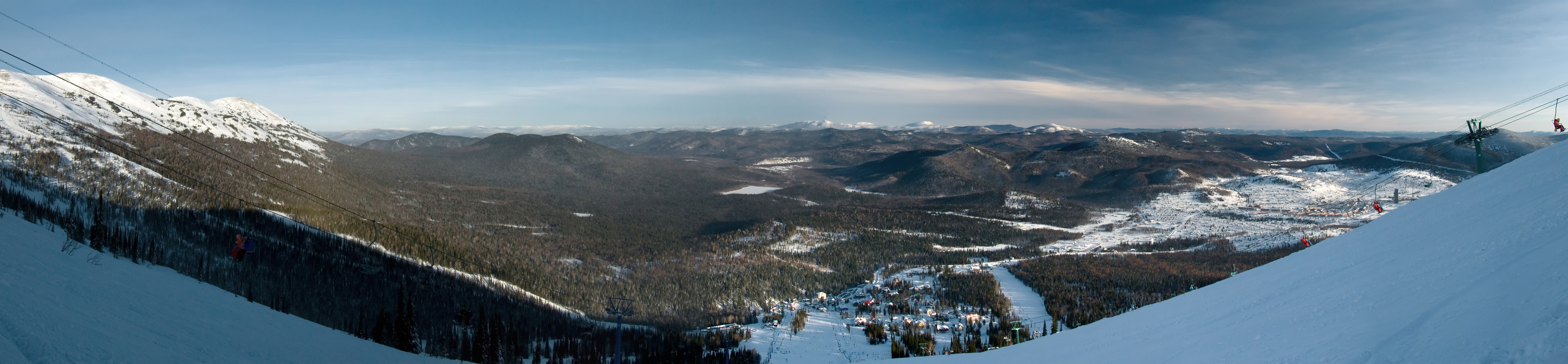
A view from Mount Zelyonaya in Sheregesh

== Hotels ==
At least 50 hotels operate in Sheregesh.
