= Mariinsk =

Mariinsk Мариинск
- Town
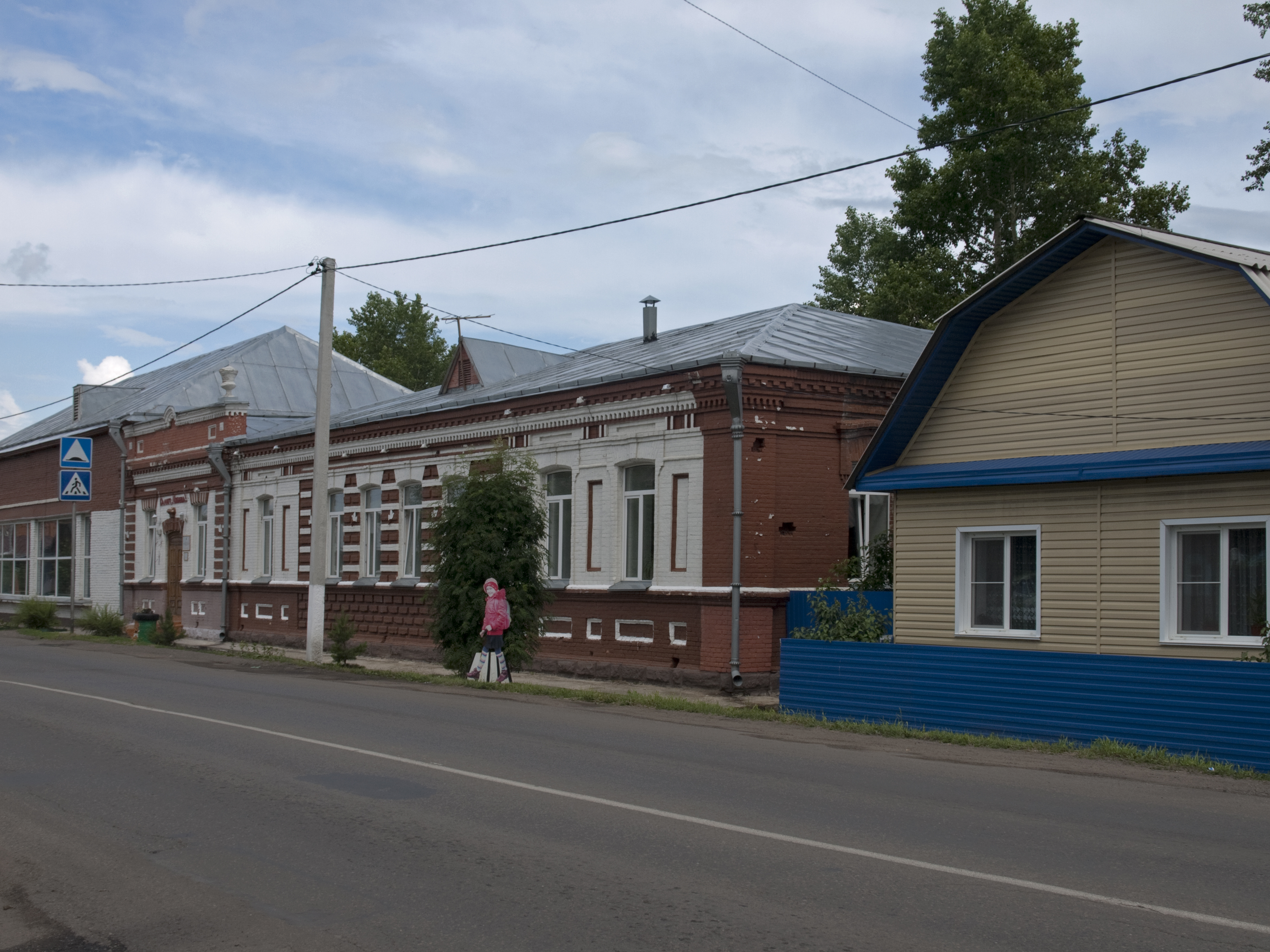
- Rabochaya Street in Mariinsk

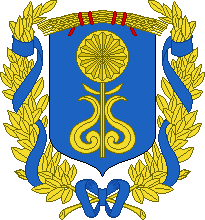
- Coat of arms
- Interactive map of Mariinsk
- Location of Mariinsk Mariinsk (Kemerovo Oblast)
- Coordinates: 56°12′N 87°47′E
- Country: Russia
- Federal subject: Kemerovo Oblast
- Founded: 18th century
- Town status since: 1856
- Elevation: 130 m (430 ft)

Population (2010 Census)
  - Total: 40,526
  - Estimate (2025): 39,883 (−1.6%)

Administrative status
  - Subordinated to: Mariinsk Town Under Oblast Jurisdiction
  - Capital of: Mariinsky District, Mariinsk Town Under Oblast Jurisdiction

Municipal status
  - Municipal district: Mariinsky Municipal District
  - Urban settlement: Mariinskoye Urban Settlement
  - Capital of: Mariinsky Municipal District, Mariinskoye Urban Settlement
- Time zone: UTC+7 (MSK+4)
- Postal codes: 652150, 652152–652156, 652159
- OKTMO ID: 32616101001
- Website: www.gorod-mariinsk.ru

Mariinsk (Russian: Мариинск) is a town in Kemerovo Oblast, Russia, where the Trans-Siberian Railway crosses the Kiya River (Ob's basin), 180 kilometers (110 mi) northeast of Kemerovo, the administrative center of the oblast. Population: 40,526 (2010 census); 42,977 (2002 census); 40,956 (1989 Soviet census); 39,700 (1972).

== History ==
It was founded in the 18th century as the village of Kiyskoye (Кийское). In 1856, it was granted town status as Kiysk and renamed Mariinsk after Empress Maria, consort of Alexander II, one year later.

== Administrative and municipal status ==
Within the framework of administrative divisions, Mariinsk serves as the administrative center of Mariinsky District, even though is not a part of it. As an administrative division, it is incorporated separately as Mariinsk Town Under Oblast Jurisdiction – an administrative unit with a status equal to that of the districts. As a municipal division, Mariinsk Town Under Oblast Jurisdiction is incorporated within Mariinsky Municipal District as Mariinskoye Urban Settlement.
