= Snezhinsky (rural locality) =

Snezhinsky (Russian: Снежинский; masculine), Snezhinskaya (Снежинская; feminine), or Snezhinskoye (Снежинское; neuter) is the name of several rural localities in Russia:

- Snezhinsky, Kemerovo Oblast, a settlement in Staropesterevskaya Rural Territory of Belovsky District of Kemerovo Oblast
- Snezhinsky, Novosibirsk Oblast, a settlement in Chulymsky District of Novosibirsk Oblast
