= Kaz, Russia =

Kaz Каз
- Urban-type settlement
- Interactive map of Kaz
- Location of Kaz Kaz (Kemerovo Oblast)
- Coordinates: 53.1125°N 87.5544°E
- Country: Russia
- Federal subject: Kemerovo Oblast
- Administrative district: Tashtagolsky District

Population (2010 Census)
  - Total: 4,623
  - Estimate (2025): 3,975 (−14%)
- Time zone: UTC+7 (MSK+4)
- Postal code: 652930
- OKTMO ID: 32627154051

Kaz (Russian: Каз) is an urban locality (an urban-type settlement) in Tashtagolsky District of Kemerovo Oblast, Russia. Population: 4,623 (2010 census); 4,977 (2002 census); 5,218 (1989 Soviet census).
