= Mundybash =

Mundybash Мундыбаш
- Urban-type settlement
- Interactive map of Mundybash
- Location of Mundybash Mundybash (Kemerovo Oblast)
- Coordinates: 53.2102°N 87.2758°E
- Country: Russia
- Federal subject: Kemerovo Oblast
- Administrative district: Tashtagolsky District
- Founded: 1932
- Elevation: 337 m (1,106 ft)

Population (2010 Census)
  - Total: 5,097
  - Estimate (2025): 3,883 (−23.8%)
- Time zone: UTC+7 (MSK+4)
- Postal code: 652900
- OKTMO ID: 32627157051

Mundybash (Russian: Мундыбаш) is an urban locality (an urban-type settlement) in Tashtagolsky District of Kemerovo Oblast, Russia. Population: 5,097 (2010 census); 6,019 (2002 census); 6,915 (1989 Soviet census).
