= Zelenogorsky =

Zelenogorsky Зеленогорский
- Urban-type settlement
- Interactive map of Zelenogorsky
- Location of Zelenogorsky Zelenogorsky (Kemerovo Oblast)
- Coordinates: 55.0048°N 86.9531°E
- Country: Russia
- Federal subject: Kemerovo Oblast
- Administrative district: Krapivinsky District
- Founded: 1974

Population (2010 Census)
  - Total: 5,175
  - Estimate (1 October 2021): 4,612 (−10.9%)
- Time zone: UTC+7 (MSK+4)
- Postal code: 652449
- OKTMO ID: 32610153051

Zelenogorsky (Russian: Зеленогорский) is an urban locality (an urban-type settlement) in Krapivinsky District of Kemerovo Oblast, Russia. Population: 5,175 (2010 census); 5,382 (2002 census); 6,451 (1989 Soviet census).
