= Verkh-Chebula =

Verkh-Chebula Верх-Чебула
- Urban-type settlement
- Interactive map of Verkh-Chebula
- Location of Verkh-Chebula Verkh-Chebula (Kemerovo Oblast)
- Coordinates: 56.0329°N 87.6219°E
- Country: Russia
- Federal subject: Kemerovo Oblast
- Administrative district: Chebulinsky District
- Founded: 1762

Population (2010 Census)
  - Total: 5,060
  - Estimate (1 October 2021): 5,309 (+4.9%)
- Time zone: UTC+7 (MSK+4)
- Postal code: 652270
- OKTMO ID: 32637151051

Verkh-Chebula (Russian: Верх-Чебула) is an urban locality (an urban-type settlement) in Chebulinsky District of Kemerovo Oblast, Russia. Population: 5,060 (2010 census); 5,357 (2002 census); 5,474 (1989 Soviet census).
