= Belogorsk, Kemerovo Oblast =

Coordinates: 55°02′N 88°49′E

Belogorsk (Russian: Белого́рск) is an urban locality (an urban-type settlement) in Tisulsky District of Kemerovo Oblast, Russia, located on the eastern spurs of the Kuznetsk Alatau mountain range. Population: 3,278 (2010 census); 3,540 (2002 census); 3,772 (1989 Soviet census); 4,400 (1969).
