= Mariinsky District =

Mariinsky District Мариинский район (Russian)
- District
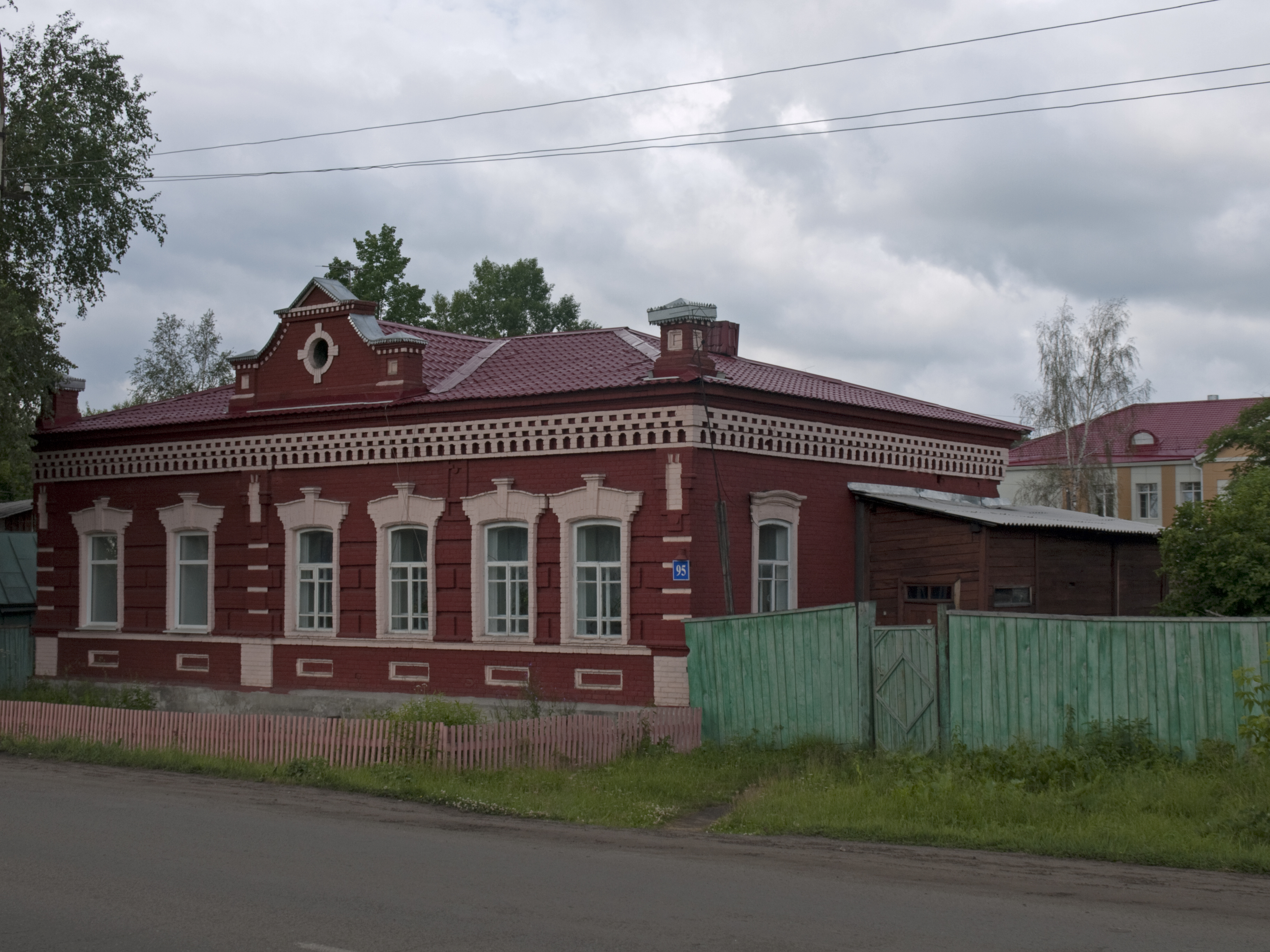
- Lenina Street, Mariinsk

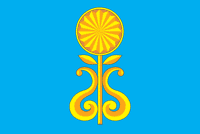
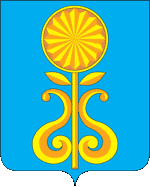
- Flag Coat of arms
- Location of Mariinsky District in Kemerovo Oblast
- Coordinates: 56.387°N 87.821°E
- Country: Russia
- Federal subject: Kemerovo Oblast
- Established: 4 September 1924
- Administrative center: Mariinsk

Area
  - Total: 5,607 km^{2} (2,165 sq mi)

Population (2010 Census)
  - Total: 17,285
  - Density: 3.083/km^{2} (7.984/sq mi)
  - Urban: 0%
  - Rural: 100%

Administrative structure
  - Administrative divisions: 12 rural territorie
  - Inhabited localities: 55 rural localities

Municipal structure
  - Municipally incorporated as: Mariinsky Municipal District
  - Municipal divisions: 1 urban settlements, 12 rural settlements
- Time zone: UTC+7 (MSK+4)
- OKTMO ID: 32616000
- Website: http://mariinsk.ru/

Mariinsky District (Russian: Марии́нский райо́н) is an administrative district (raion), one of the nineteen in Kemerovo Oblast, Russia. As a municipal division, it is incorporated as Mariinsky Municipal District. It is located in the north of the oblast. The area of the district is 5,607 square kilometers (2,165 sq mi). Its administrative center is the town of Mariinsk (which is not administratively a part of the district). Population: 17,285 (2010 census); 19,182 (2002 Census); 22,037 (1989 Soviet census).

== Administrative and municipal status ==
Within the framework of administrative divisions, Mariinsky District is one of the nineteen in the oblast. The town of Mariinsk serves as its administrative center, despite being incorporated separately as a town under oblast jurisdiction—an administrative unit with the status equal to that of the districts.

As a municipal division, the district is incorporated as Mariinsky Municipal District, with Mariinsk Town Under Oblast Jurisdiction being incorporated within it as Mariinskoye Urban Settlement.
