= Temirtau, Russia =

Temirtau Темиртау
- Urban-type settlement
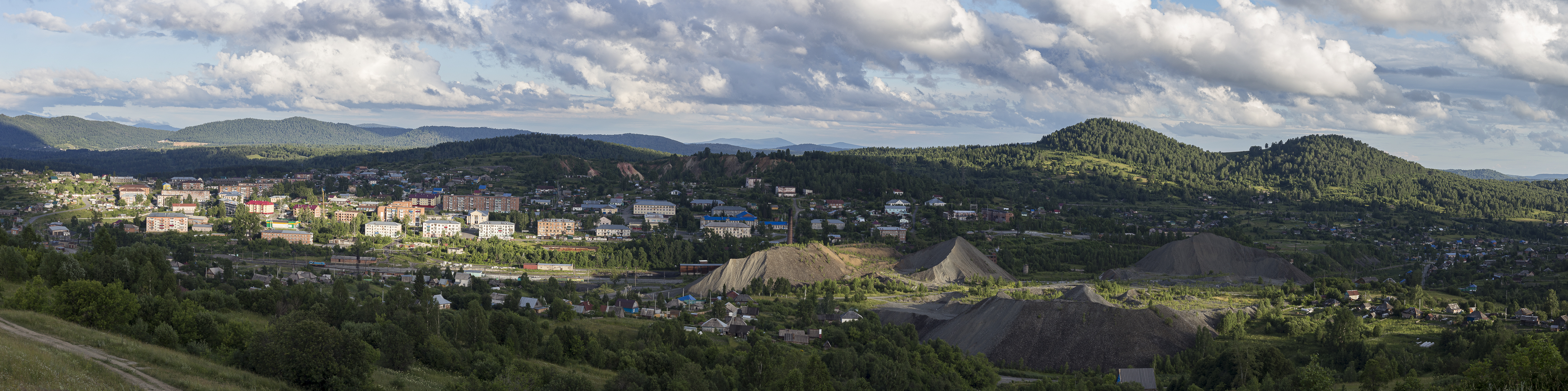
- Interactive map of Temirtau
- Location of Temirtau Temirtau (Kemerovo Oblast)
- Coordinates: 53.1387°N 87.4578°E
- Country: Russia
- Federal subject: Kemerovo Oblast
- Administrative district: Tashtagolsky District
- Founded: 1931
- Elevation: 344 m (1,129 ft)

Population (2010 Census)
  - Total: 4,352
  - Estimate (2025): 3,438 (−21%)
- Time zone: UTC+7 (MSK+4)
- Postal code: 652920
- OKTMO ID: 32627165051

Temirtau (Russian: Темиртау) is an urban locality (an urban-type settlement) in Tashtagolsky District of Kemerovo Oblast, Russia. Population: 4,352 (2010 census); 4,843 (2002 census); 5,472 (1989 Soviet census).
