= Belovsky District, Kemerovo Oblast =

Belovsky District Беловский район (Russian)
- District
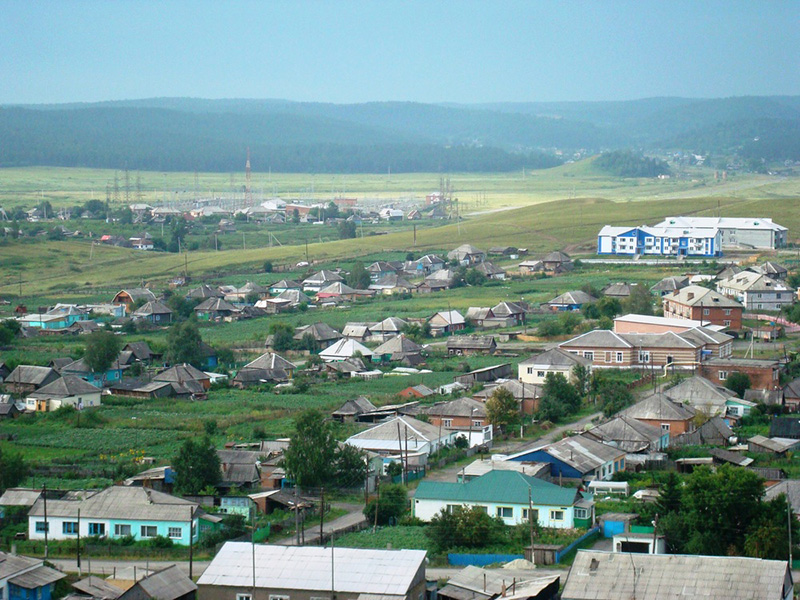
- The settlement of Starobachaty is the most populous inhabited locality in Belovsky District

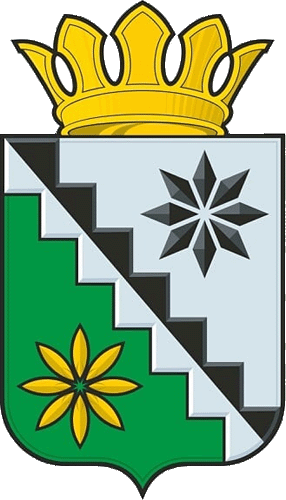
- Flag Coat of arms
- Location of Belovsky District in Kemerovo Oblast
- Coordinates: 54°25′N 86°18′E
- Country: Russia
- Federal subject: Kemerovo Oblast
- Established: 4 September 1924
- Administrative center: Vishnevka

Area
  - Total: 3,400 km^{2} (1,300 sq mi)

Population (2010 Census)
  - Total: 30,204
  - Density: 8.9/km^{2} (23/sq mi)
  - Urban: 0%
  - Rural: 100%

Administrative structure
  - Administrative divisions: 8 rural territorie
  - Inhabited localities: 47 rural localities

Municipal structure
  - Municipally incorporated as: Belovsky Municipal District
  - Municipal divisions: 0 urban settlements, 8 rural settlements
- Time zone: UTC+7 (MSK+4)
- OKTMO ID: 32601000
- Website: http://www.belovorn.ru

Belovsky District (Russian: Бело́вский райо́н) is an administrative district (raion), one of the nineteen in Kemerovo Oblast, Russia. As a municipal division, it is incorporated as Belovsky Municipal District. It is located in the center of the oblast. The area of the district is 3,400 square kilometers (1,300 sq mi). Its administrative center is the rural locality (a selo) of Vishnevka. Population: 30,204 (2010 census); 33,382 (2002 Census); 25,815 (1989 Soviet census).

== Geography ==
Belovsky District is at the center of the Kuznetsk Basin (the "Kuzbass" coal region of the Tom River basin), and is at the center of Kemerovo Oblast. The district's borders effectively surround the large town of Belovo, Kemerovo Oblast, and is just south of the town of Leninsk-Kuznetsky (city). The terrain is mostly flat in the center, on the plain of the Inya River as it flows north and west; the Tom River runs north to south along the east border. Rolling hills rise in the east towards the Kuznetsk Alatau, and towards the Salair Ridge in the west. Vegetation is steppe and mountain forest-steppe, with patches of forest scattered around the region.

The district is about 100 km west-to-east, and 71 km north-to-south. It is located about 100 km south of the city of Kemerovo, and 100 km north of Novokuznetsk. Subdivisions of the district include 8 rural areas, and 47 rural settlements.

Belovsky borders with Krapivinsky District in the north, Novokuznetsky District in the east, Prokopyevsky District in the south, and with Guryevsky District in the west.

== Climate ==
The climate of the district is humid continental (Koppen Dfb). The average temperature in January is −17.4 °C (0.7 °F), and is 16.8 °C (62.2 °F) in July. The frost-free period in the north of the district is 145 days, and the average annual precipitation is 370–495 mm/year.

== Economy ==
The two dominant industries of the district are coal and agriculture. There are three coal fields in the district: Bachatskij, Shestakov, Karakansky. 15% of the coal production of the Kuznetz basin comes from the Belovsky District. Agricultureis diverse, with grains, potatoes, livestock and dairy.
