= Komsomolsk, Kemerovo Oblast =

Komsomolsk Комсомольск
- Urban-type settlement
- Interactive map of Komsomolsk
- Location of Komsomolsk Komsomolsk (Kemerovo Oblast)
- Coordinates: 55.6314°N 88.1848°E
- Country: Russia
- Federal subject: Kemerovo Oblast
- Administrative district: Tisulsky District

Population (2010 Census)
  - Total: 2,294
  - Estimate (2025): 1,494 (−34.9%)
- Time zone: UTC+7 (MSK+4)
- Postal code: 652231
- OKTMO ID: 32628160051

Komsomolsk (Russian: Комсомольск) is an urban locality (an urban-type settlement) in Tisulsky District of Kemerovo Oblast, Russia. Population: 2,294 (2010 census); 2,631 (2002 census); 3,479 (1989 Soviet census).
