= Itatsky =

Itatsky Итатский
- Urban-type settlement
- Interactive map of Itatsky
- Location of Itatsky Itatsky (Kemerovo Oblast)
- Coordinates: 56.0685°N 89.0350°E
- Country: Russia
- Federal subject: Kemerovo Oblast
- Administrative district: Tyazhinsky District
- Founded: 1773
- Elevation: 246 m (807 ft)

Population (2010 Census)
  - Total: 3,726
  - Estimate (1 October 2021): 2,632 (−29.4%)
- Time zone: UTC+7 (MSK+4)
- Postal code: 652245
- OKTMO ID: 32634154051

Itatsky (Russian: Итатский) is an urban locality (an urban-type settlement) in Tyazhinsky District of Kemerovo Oblast, Russia. Population: 3,726 (2010 census); 4,343 (2002 census); 5,121 (1989 Soviet census).
