= Kemerovsky District =

Kemerovsky District Кемеровский район (Russian)
- District
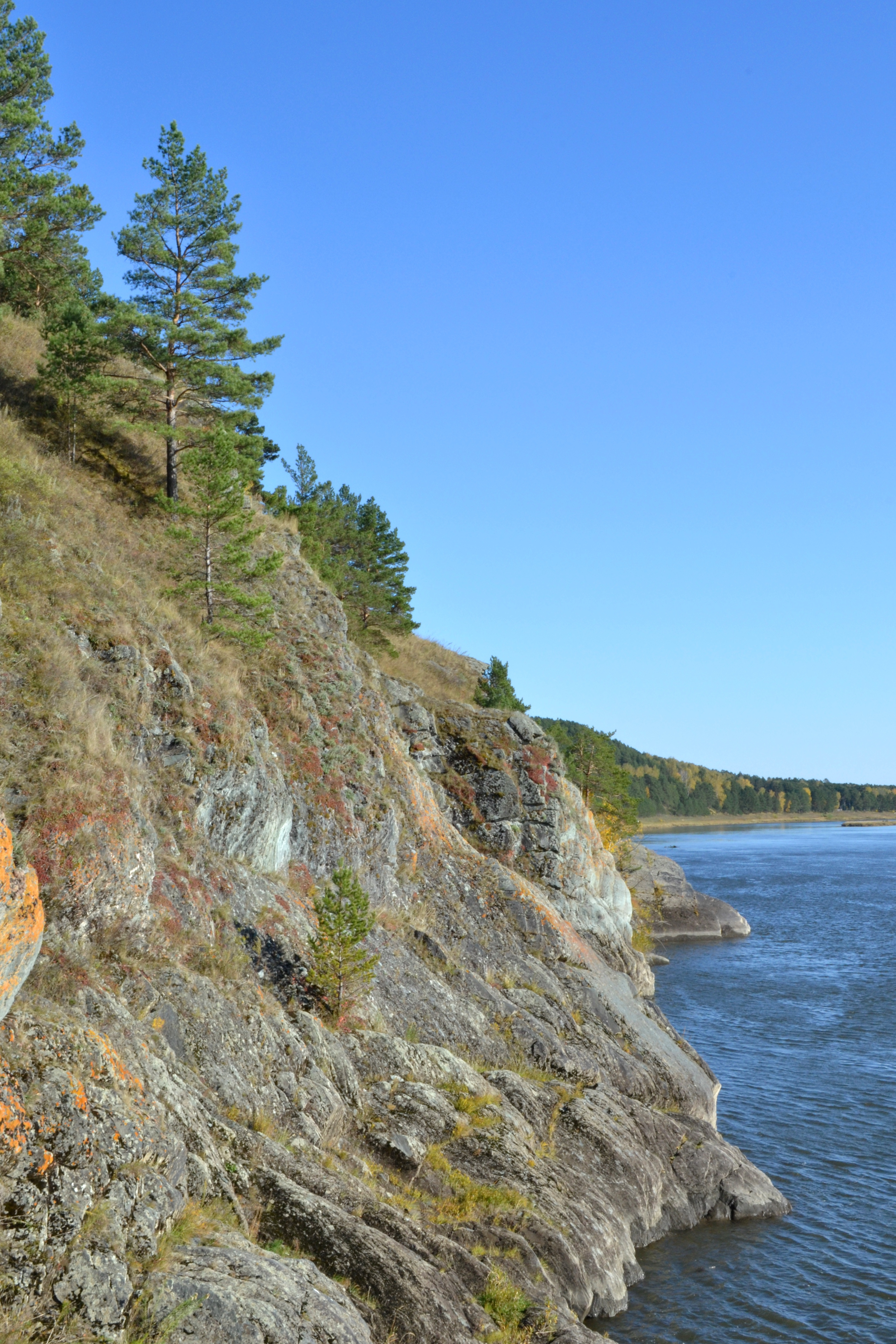
- Painted Preserve, Tom River

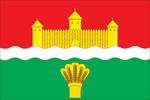
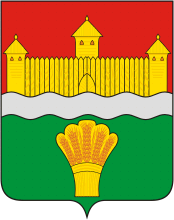
- Flag Coat of arms
- Location of Kemerovsky District in Kemerovo Oblast
- Coordinates: 55°20′00″N 86°04′00″E
- Country: Russia
- Federal subject: Kemerovo Oblast
- Administrative center: Kemerovo

Area
  - Total: 4,391 km^{2} (1,695 sq mi)

Population (2010 Census)
  - Total: 45,459
  - Density: 10.35/km^{2} (26.81/sq mi)
  - Urban: 0%
  - Rural: 100%

Administrative structure
  - Administrative divisions: 9 rural territorie
  - Inhabited localities: 71 rural localities

Municipal structure
  - Municipally incorporated as: Kemerovsky Municipal District
  - Municipal divisions: 0 urban settlements, 9 rural settlements
- Time zone: UTC+7 (MSK+4)
- OKTMO ID: 32607000
- Website: http://www.akmrko.ru/

Kemerovsky District (Russian: Ке́меровский райо́н) is an administrative district (raion), one of the nineteen in Kemerovo Oblast, Russia. As a municipal division, it is incorporated as Kemerovsky Municipal District. It is located in the northern central portion of the oblast. The area of the district is 4,391 square kilometers (1,695 sq mi). Its administrative center is the city of Kemerovo (which is not administratively a part of the district). Population: 45,459 (2010 census); 39,036 (2002 Census); 37,207 (1989 Soviet census).

== Geography ==
Kemerovsky District is in the northwest of the Kuznetsk Depression, which is the basin of the Tom River between the Salair Ridge to the west, and the Kuznetsk Alatau mountains to the east. The district surrounds the urban city district of Kemerovo, and features a stretch of the Tom River running southeast-to-northwest through the middle. The district covers a rich portion of the Kuznetsk Basin (the "Kuzbass" coal region). The district is 150 km north of the Novokuznetsk. The terrain is a steeply sloping, hilly plain. Vegetation is northern steppe forest, with about 20% of the area steppe.

The district is about 100 km north-to-south, and 75 km west-to-east. Kemerovsky is about 200 km east of the city of Novosibirsk, and the M53 ("Novosibirsk - Krasnoyarsk") highway runs through the district. Subdivisions of the district include 9 rural settlements. The climate of the district is humid continental (Koppen Dfb).

Kemorovsky District borders Krapivinsky District to the south, Izhmorsky District, Chebulinsky District, and Tisulsky District to the east, Topkinsky District to the west, and Yaysky District and Yashkinsky District to the north.

== Administrative and municipal status ==
Within the framework of administrative divisions, Kemerovsky District is one of the nineteen in the oblast. The city of Kemerovo serves as its administrative center, despite being incorporated separately as a city under oblast jurisdiction—an administrative unit with the status equal to that of the districts.

As a municipal division, the district is incorporated as Kemerovsky Municipal District. Kemerovo City Under Oblast Jurisdiction is incorporated separately from the district as Kemerovsky Urban Okrug.
