= Kiya (river) =

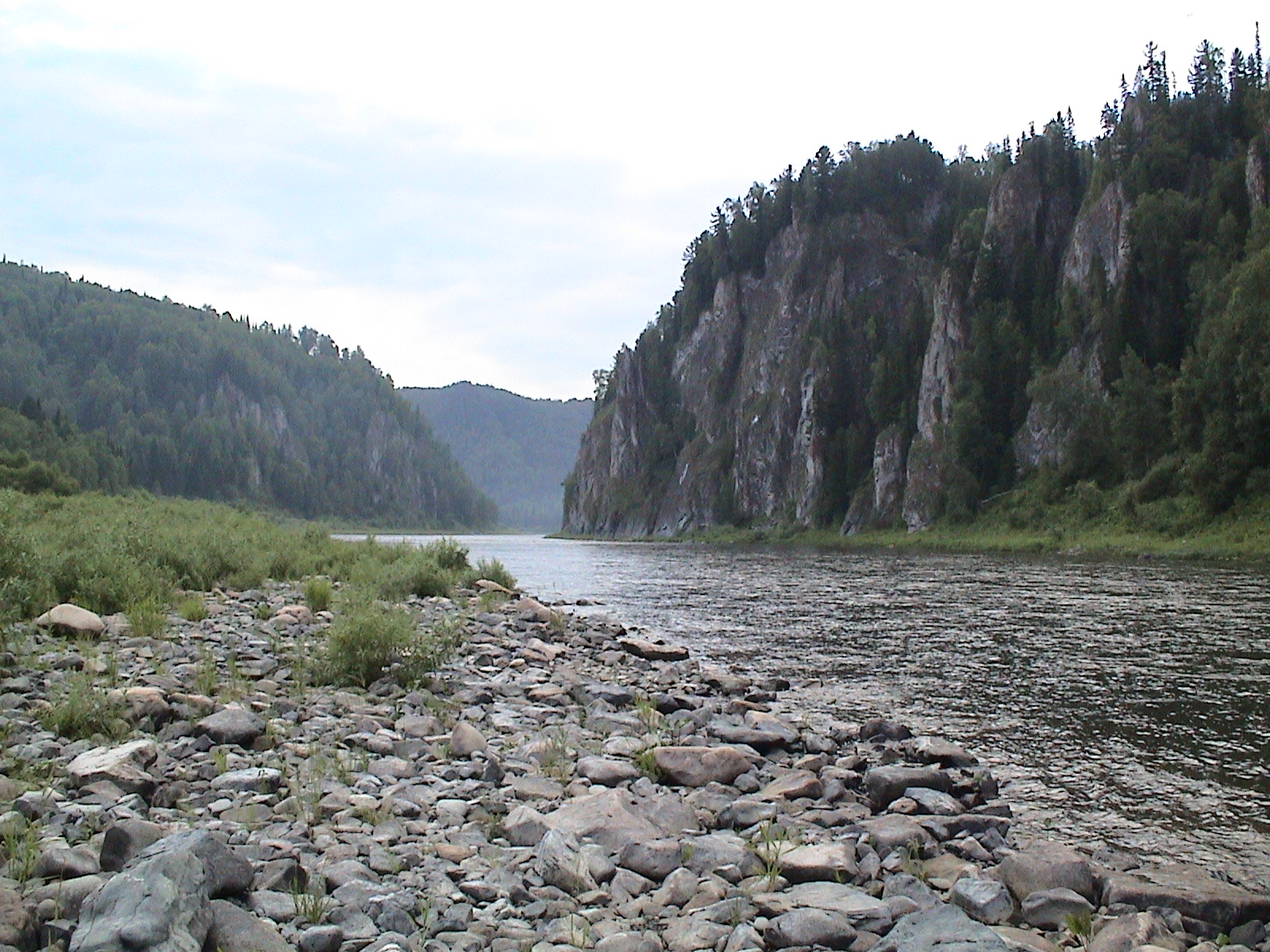

Location
- Country: Russia

Physical characteristics
- Source: Kuznetsk Alatau
- Mouth: Chulym
  - coordinates: 56.8531°N 86.665°E
- Length: 548 km (341 mi)
- Basin size: 32,200 km^{2} (12,400 sq mi)

Basin features
- Progression: Chulym→ Ob→ Kara Sea

The Kiya (Russian: Ки́я) is a river located in Tomsk and Kemerovo Oblasts of Russia. It is a left tributary of the Chulym, in the Ob's drainage basin). The Kiya is 548 kilometres (341 mi) long and has a drainage basin of 32,200 square kilometres (12,400 mi^{2}). The river originates in the Kuznetsk Alatau and flows in a northwest, joining the Chulym approximately 40 kilometres (25 mi) upstream from the town of Asino.

Its main tributaries include Tyazhin and Chet (right bank), and Kozhakh and Antibes (left bank).

The town of Mariinsk is situated along the Kiya River.
