= Tisul, Tisulsky District, Kemerovo Oblast =

Tisul Тисуль
- Urban-type settlement
- Interactive map of Tisul
- Location of Tisul Tisul (Kemerovo Oblast)
- Coordinates: 55.7633°N 88.3163°E
- Country: Russia
- Federal subject: Kemerovo Oblast
- Administrative district: Tisulsky District
- Founded: 1690

Population (2010 Census)
  - Total: 9,049
  - Estimate (2025): 7,769 (−14.1%)
- Time zone: UTC+7 (MSK+4)
- Postal code: 652210
- OKTMO ID: 32628151051

Tisul (Russian: Тисуль) is an urban locality (an urban-type settlement) in Tisulsky District of Kemerovo Oblast, Russia. Population: 9,049 (2010 census); 9,484 (2002 census); 9,501 (1989 Soviet census).

== Climate ==
Climate data for Tisul (extremes 1936-present)
Month	Jan	Feb	Mar	Apr	May	Jun	Jul	Aug	Sep	Oct	Nov	Dec	Year
Record high °C (°F)	9.2 (48.6)	12.6 (54.7)	20.1 (68.2)	30.7 (87.3)	35.1 (95.2)	35.8 (96.4)	37.3 (99.1)	34.8 (94.6)	32.8 (91.0)	26.3 (79.3)	18.2 (64.8)	9.9 (49.8)	37.3 (99.1)
Mean daily maximum °C (°F)	−11.0 (12.2)	−7.4 (18.7)	0.2 (32.4)	9.6 (49.3)	17.7 (63.9)	23.3 (73.9)	25.0 (77.0)	22.5 (72.5)	15.4 (59.7)	7.6 (45.7)	−2.9 (26.8)	−8.5 (16.7)	7.6 (45.7)
Daily mean °C (°F)	−16.2 (2.8)	−13.3 (8.1)	−5.9 (21.4)	3.3 (37.9)	10.5 (50.9)	16.4 (61.5)	18.5 (65.3)	15.9 (60.6)	9.3 (48.7)	2.6 (36.7)	−7.1 (19.2)	−13.3 (8.1)	1.7 (35.1)
Mean daily minimum °C (°F)	−21.0 (−5.8)	−18.7 (−1.7)	−11.6 (11.1)	−2.3 (27.9)	3.9 (39.0)	9.8 (49.6)	12.2 (54.0)	10.1 (50.2)	4.2 (39.6)	−1.6 (29.1)	−11.2 (11.8)	−18.0 (−0.4)	−3.7 (25.4)
Record low °C (°F)	−51.4 (−60.5)	−49.5 (−57.1)	−42.5 (−44.5)	−31.3 (−24.3)	−14.8 (5.4)	−4.3 (24.3)	1.0 (33.8)	−2.0 (28.4)	−10.6 (12.9)	−26.9 (−16.4)	−43.5 (−46.3)	−47.1 (−52.8)	−51.4 (−60.5)
Average precipitation mm (inches)	11.6 (0.46)	10.5 (0.41)	16.3 (0.64)	30.4 (1.20)	49.0 (1.93)	71.0 (2.80)	76.7 (3.02)	73.3 (2.89)	54.9 (2.16)	40.1 (1.58)	29.8 (1.17)	21.3 (0.84)	484.9 (19.1)
Source: pogoda.ru.net
