= Novy Gorodok =

Novy Gorodok Новый Городок
- Urban-type settlement
- Interactive map of Novy Gorodok
- Location of Novy Gorodok Novy Gorodok (Kemerovo Oblast)
- Coordinates: 54.3062°N 86.2974°E
- Country: Russia
- Federal subject: Kemerovo Oblast

Population (2010 Census)
  - Total: 15,750
  - Estimate (2025): 14,156 (−10.1%)
- Time zone: UTC+7 (MSK+4)
- Postal code: 652645
- OKTMO ID: 32707000071

Novy Gorodok (Russian: Новый Городок) is an urban locality (an urban-type settlement) in Kemerovo Oblast, Russia. Population: 15,750 (2010 census); 16,765 (2002 census); 20,278 (1989 Soviet census).
