= Gramoteino =

Gramoteino Грамотеино
- Urban-type settlement
- Interactive map of Gramoteino
- Location of Gramoteino Gramoteino (Kemerovo Oblast)
- Coordinates: 54.5339°N 86.3817°E
- Country: Russia
- Federal subject: Kemerovo Oblast

Population (2010 Census)
  - Total: 12,996
  - Estimate (1 October 2021): 11,217 (−13.7%)
- Time zone: UTC+7 (MSK+4)
- Postal code: 652695
- OKTMO ID: 32707000061

Gramoteino (Russian: Грамотеино) is an urban locality (an urban-type settlement) in Kemerovo Oblast, Russia. Population: 12,996 (2010 census); 14,366 (2002 census); 16,776 (1989 Soviet census).
