= Prokopyevsk =

City in Kemerovo Oblast, Russia

Prokopyevsk Прокопьевск
- City
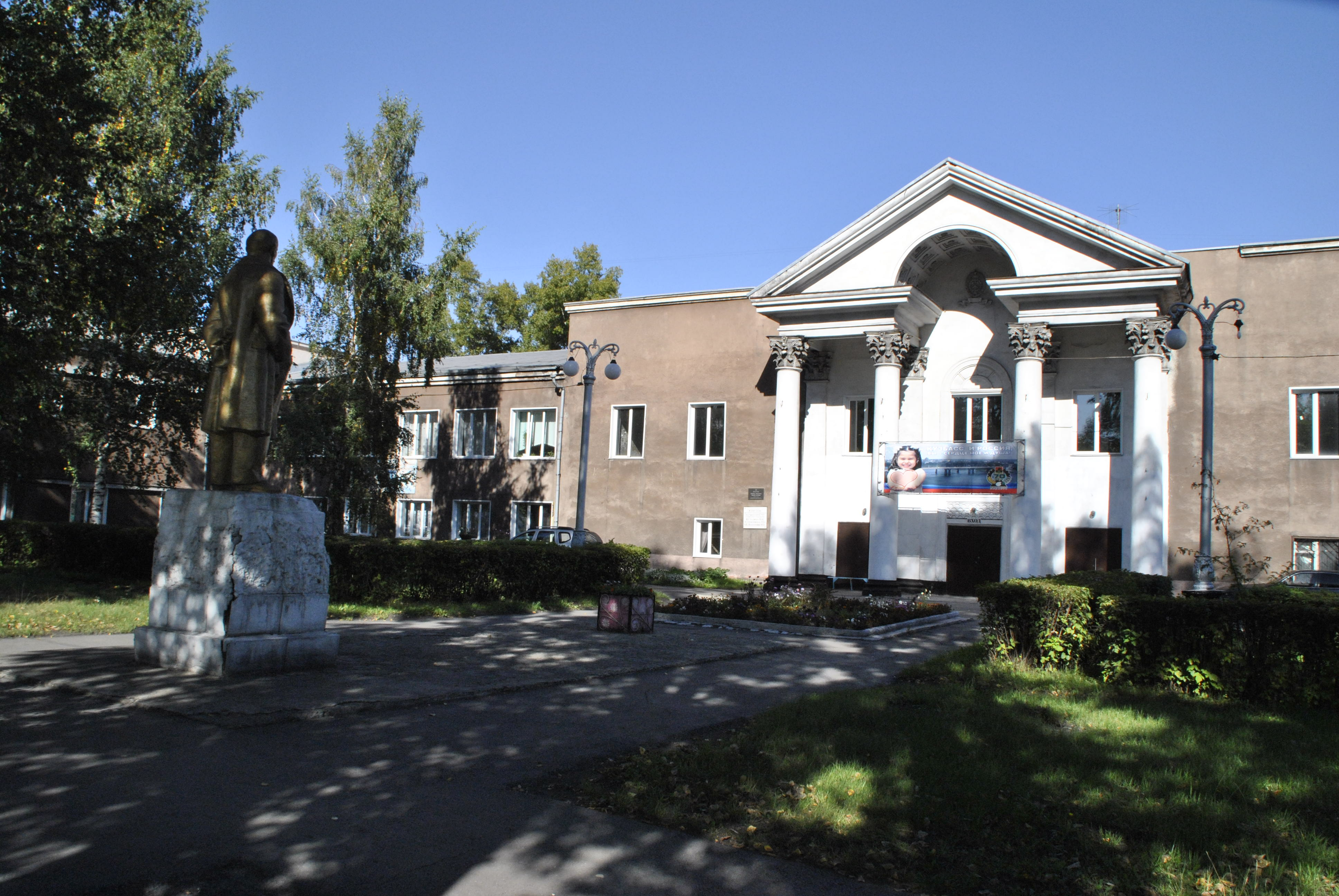
- Artyom Palace of Culture

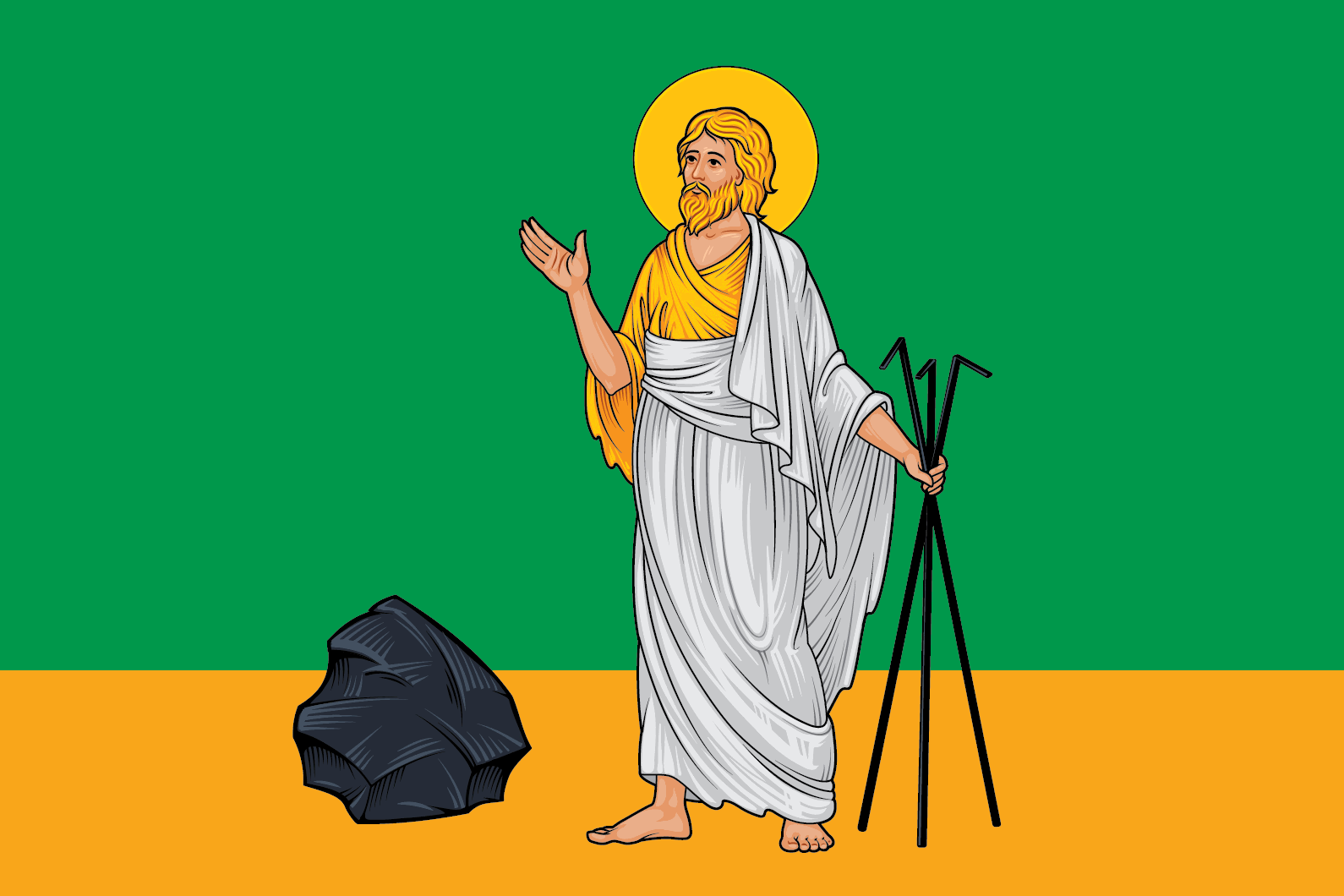
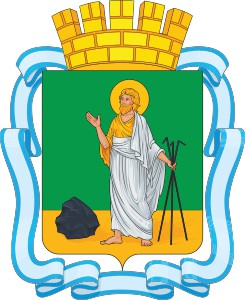
- Flag Coat of arms
- Interactive map of Prokopyevsk
- Location of Prokopyevsk Prokopyevsk (Kemerovo Oblast)
- Coordinates: 53°53′N 86°43′E
- Country: Russia
- Federal subject: Kemerovo Oblast
- Founded: 1918
- City status since: 1931

Government
  - Head: Maksim Shkarabeynikov
- Elevation: 280 m (920 ft)

Population (2010 Census)
  - Total: 210,130
  - Estimate (2025): 170,429 (−18.9%)
  - Rank: 88th in 2010

Administrative status
  - Subordinated to: Prokopyevsk City Under Oblast Jurisdiction
  - Capital of: Prokopyevsky District, Prokopyevsk City Under Oblast Jurisdiction

Municipal status
  - Urban okrug: Prokopyevsky Urban Okrug
  - Capital of: Prokopyevsky Urban Okrug, Prokopyevsky Municipal District
- Time zone: UTC+7 (MSK+4)
- Postal code: 653000
- Dialing code: +7 3846
- OKTMO ID: 32737000001
- Website: pearlkuz.ru

Prokopyevsk (Russian: Прокопьевск, IPA: [prɐˈkopʲjɪfsk]) is a city in Kemerovo Oblast, Russia. Population: 210,130 (2010 census); 224,597 (2002 census); 273,838 (1989 Soviet census).

Historical population
Year	Pop.	±%
1926	11,000	—
1939	107,000	+872.7%
1959	281,958	+163.5%
1970	274,485	−2.7%
1979	266,167	−3.0%
1989	273,838	+2.9%
2002	224,597	−18.0%
2010	210,130	−6.4%
2021	177,819	−15.4%
Source: Census data

== History ==
It was founded in 1918 as the settlement of Prokopyevsky (Проко́пьевский) from the existing villages of Monastyrskoye and Prokopyevskoye, and was granted town status and renamed in 1931.

== Administrative and municipal status ==
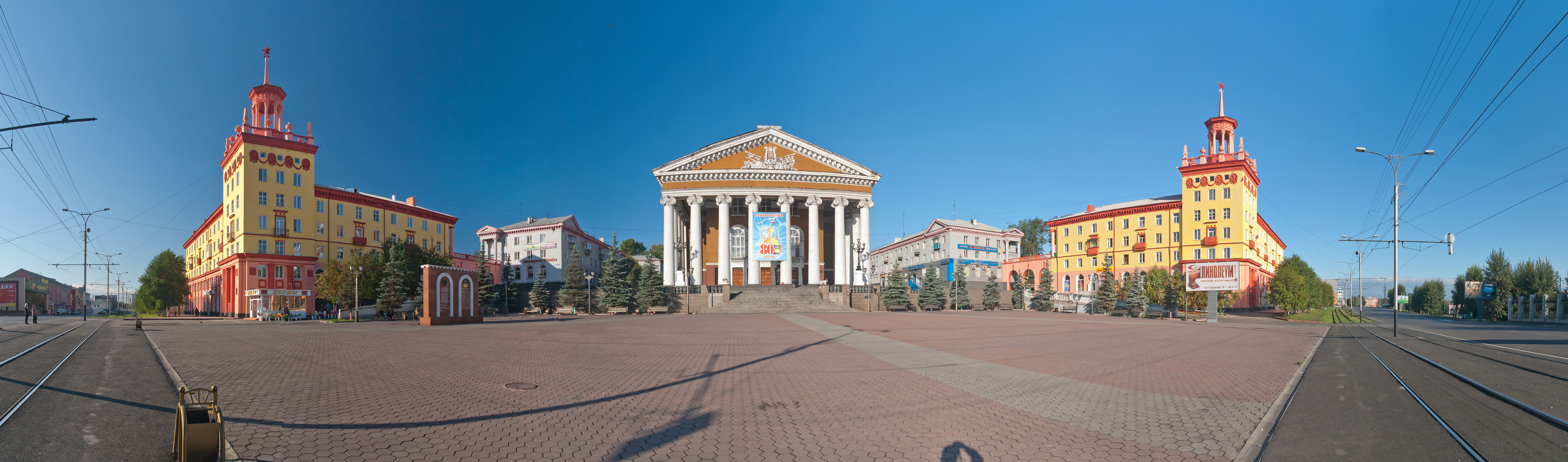
Town center

Within the framework of administrative divisions, Prokopyevsk serves as the administrative center of Prokopyevsky District, even though it is not a part of it. As an administrative division, it is incorporated separately as Prokopyevsk City Under Oblast Jurisdiction—an administrative unit with the status equal to that of the districts. As a municipal division, Prokopyevsk City Under Oblast Jurisdiction is incorporated as Prokopyevsky Urban Okrug.

== Economy ==
Prokopyevsk is one of the main centers of the extraction of coking coal in the Kuznetsk Basin (Kuzbass).
