= Bachatsky =

Human settlement in Belovo Urban Okrug, Kemerovo Oblast, Russia

Coordinates: 54°17′7″N 86°6′34″E

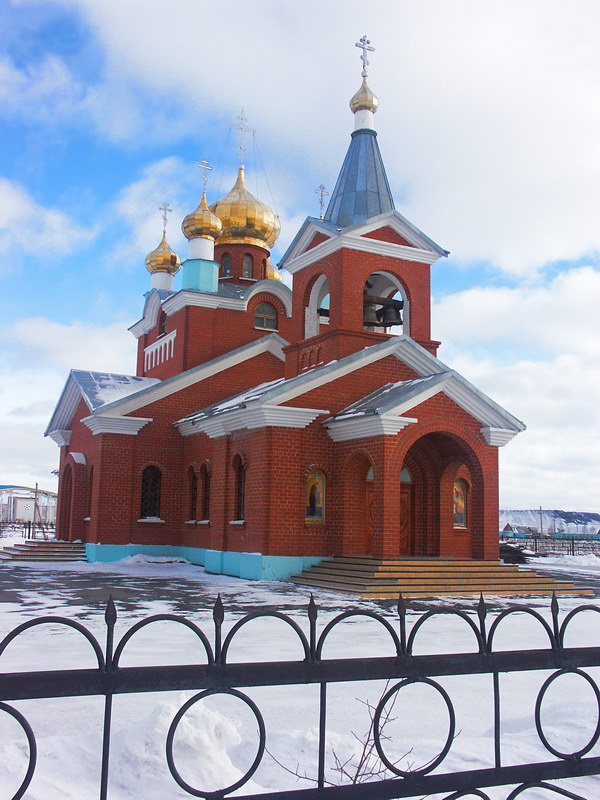
Church in Bachatsky

Bachatsky (Russian: Бачатский) is an urban locality (an urban-type settlement) under the administrative jurisdiction of Belovo Town Under Oblast Jurisdiction in Kemerovo Oblast, Russia, located 16 kilometers (9.9 mi) north of Belovo and 190 kilometers (120 mi) southeast of Kemerovo, on the border of the Salair Ridge and the Kuznetsk Basin, between the Bolshoy (Chernovoy) Bachat and Maly (Stepnoy) Bachat Rivers. Population: 14,402 (2010 census); 14,990 (2002 census); 13,365 (1989 Soviet census).
