= Prokopyevsky District =

Prokopyevsky District Прокопьевский район (Russian)
- District
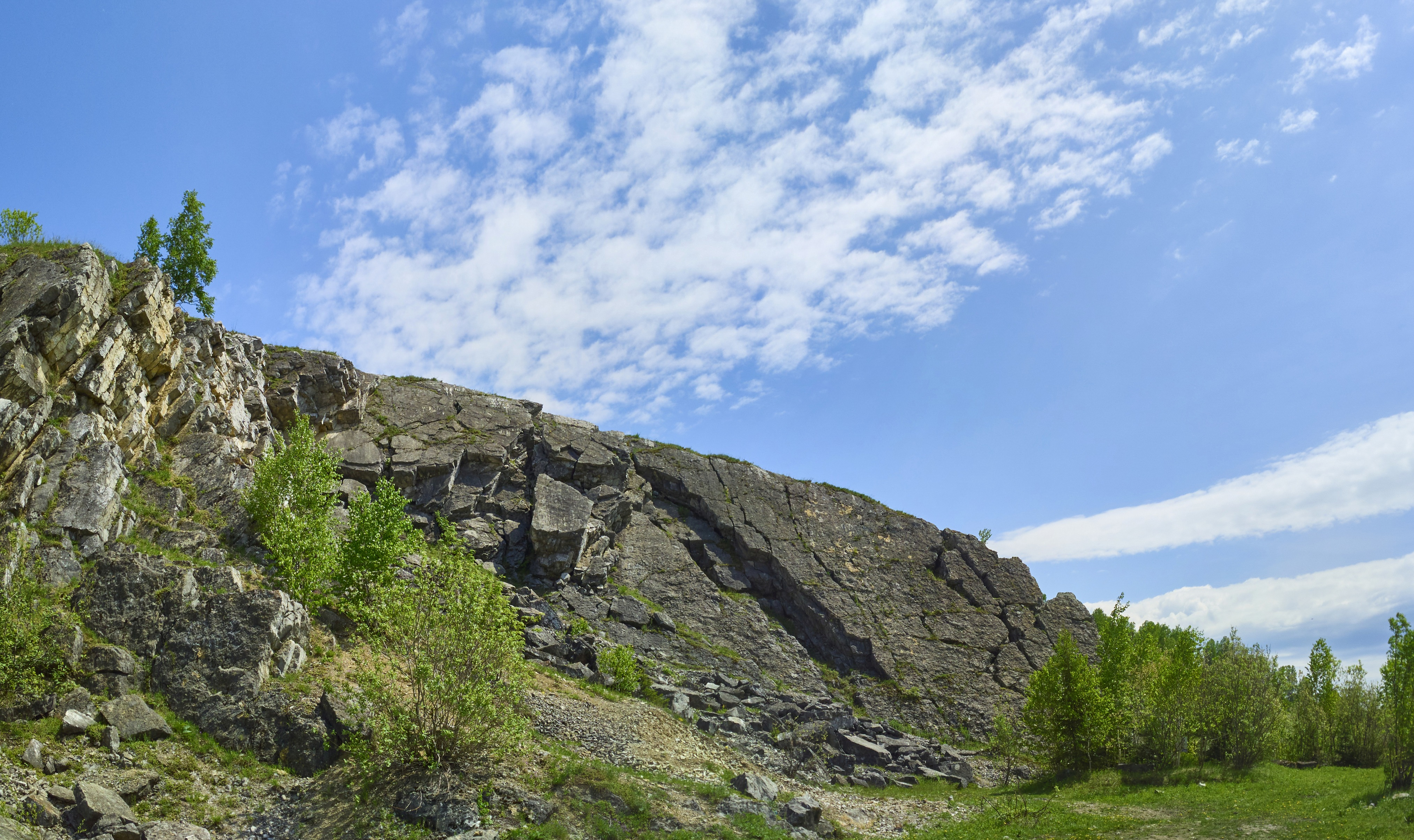
- Landscape in Prokopyevsky District

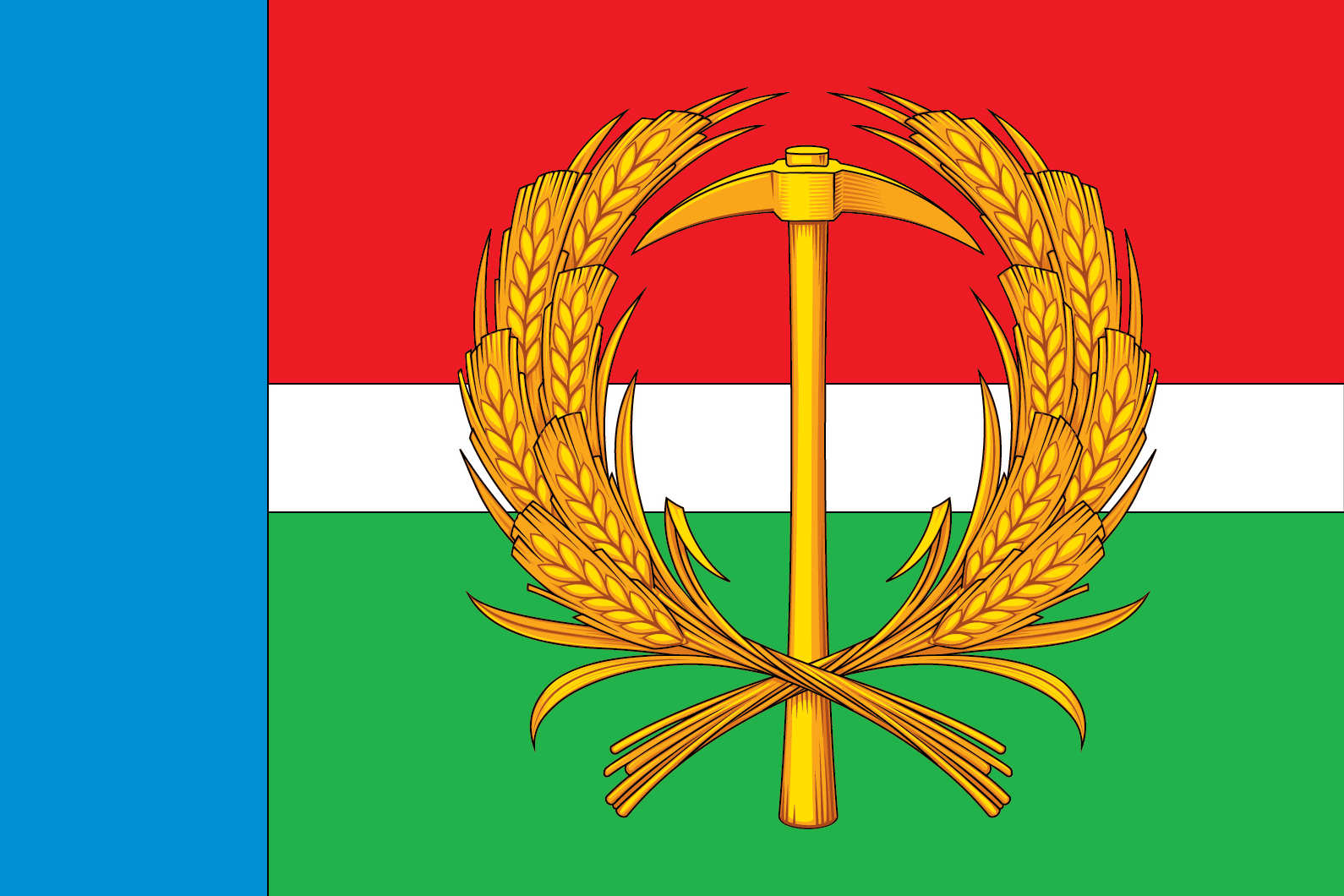
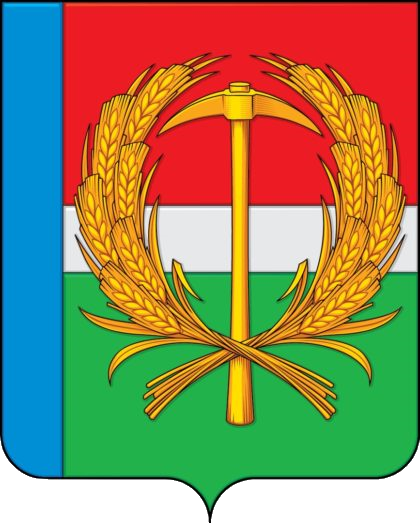
- Flag Coat of arms
- Location of Prokopyevsky District in Kemerovo Oblast
- Coordinates: 53°53′00″N 86°43′00″E
- Country: Russia
- Federal subject: Kemerovo Oblast
- Established: 1924
- Administrative center: Prokopyevsk

Area
  - Total: 3,450 km^{2} (1,330 sq mi)

Population (2010 Census)
  - Total: 31,442
  - Density: 9.11/km^{2} (23.6/sq mi)
  - Urban: 0%
  - Rural: 100%

Administrative structure
  - Administrative divisions: 10 rural territorie
  - Inhabited localities: 75 rural localities

Municipal structure
  - Municipally incorporated as: Prokopyevsky Municipal District
  - Municipal divisions: 0 urban settlements, 10 rural settlements
- Time zone: UTC+7 (MSK+4)
- OKTMO ID: 32622000
- Website: http://admprokop.ru/

Prokopyevsky District (Russian: Проко́пьевский райо́н) is an administrative district (raion), one of the nineteen in Kemerovo Oblast, Russia. As a municipal division, it is incorporated as Prokopyevsky Municipal District. It is located in the center of the oblast. The area of the district is 3,450 square kilometers (1,330 sq mi). Its administrative center is the city of Prokopyevsk (which is not administratively a part of the district). Population: 31,442 (2010 census); 33,705 (2002 Census); 35,657 (1989 Soviet census).

== Administrative and municipal status ==
Within the framework of administrative divisions, Prokopyevsky District is one of the nineteen in the oblast. The city of Prokopyevsk serves as its administrative center, despite being incorporated separately as a city under oblast jurisdiction—an administrative unit with the status equal to that of the districts.

As a municipal division, the district is incorporated as Prokopyevsky Municipal District. Prokopyevsk City Under Oblast Jurisdiction is incorporated separately from the district as Prokopyevsky Urban Okrug.
