= Inskoy =

Inskoy Инской
- Urban-type settlement
- Interactive map of Inskoy
- Location of Inskoy Inskoy (Kemerovo Oblast)
- Coordinates: 54.4332°N 86.4441°E
- Country: Russia
- Federal subject: Kemerovo Oblast
- Founded: 1956

Population (2010 Census)
  - Total: 12,590
  - Estimate (1 October 2021): 12,499 (−0.7%)
- Time zone: UTC+7 (MSK+4)
- Postal code: 652644
- OKTMO ID: 32707000066

Inskoy (Russian: Инской) is an urban locality (an urban-type settlement) in Kemerovo Oblast, Russia. Population: 12,590 (2010 census); 13,665 (2002 census); 13,753 (1989 Soviet census).
