= Tashtagol =

Tashtagol Таштагол
- Town
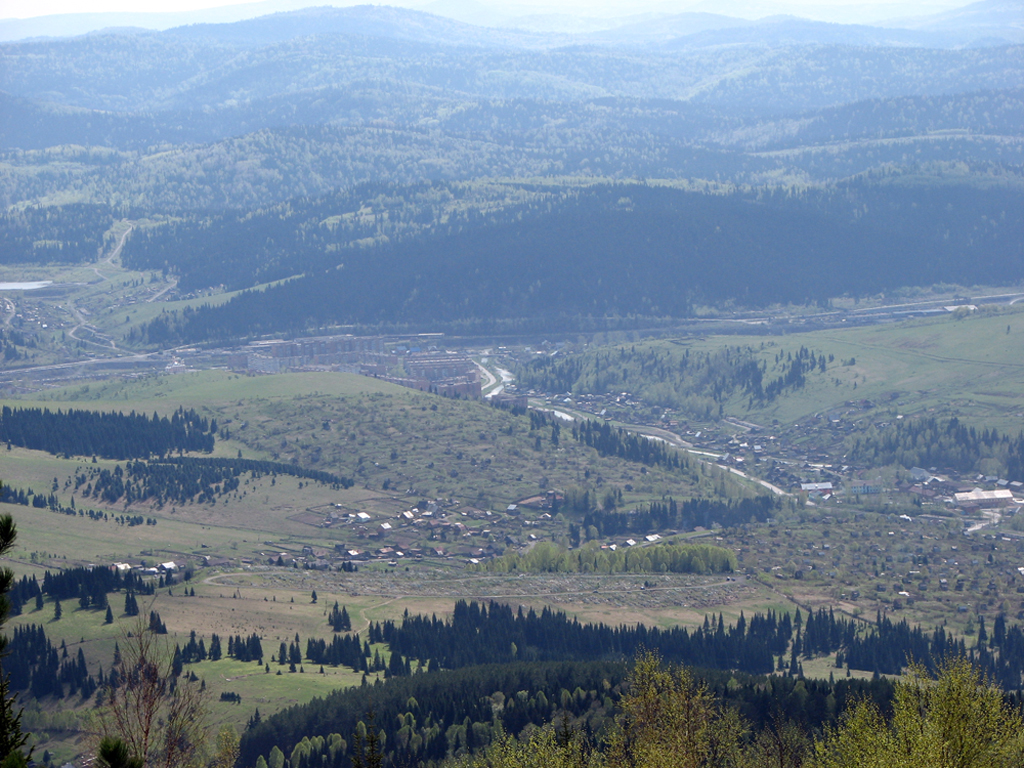
- View of Ust-Shalym Microdistrict of Tashtagol

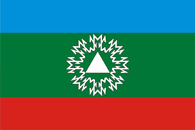
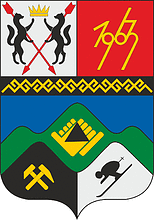
- Flag Coat of arms
- Interactive map of Tashtagol
- Location of Tashtagol Tashtagol (Kemerovo Oblast)
- Coordinates: 52°46′N 87°52′E
- Country: Russia
- Federal subject: Kemerovo Oblast
- Founded: 1939
- Town status since: 1963

Population (2010 Census)
  - Total: 23,134
  - Estimate (2025): 21,209 (−8.3%)

Administrative status
  - Subordinated to: Tashtagol Town Under Oblast Jurisdiction
  - Capital of: Tashtagolsky District, Tashtagol Town Under Oblast Jurisdiction

Municipal status
  - Municipal district: Tashtagolsky Municipal District
  - Urban settlement: Tashtagolskoye Urban Settlement
  - Capital of: Tashtagolsky Municipal District, Tashtagolskoye Urban Settlement
- Time zone: UTC+7 (MSK+4)
- Postal codes: 652990–652993, 652999
- OKTMO ID: 32627101001

Tashtagol (Russian: Таштаго́л; Shor: Таштағол, romanized: Taştağol) is a town in Kemerovo Oblast, Russia, located on the Kondoma River 511 kilometers (318 mi) south of Kemerovo, the administrative center of the oblast.

== History ==
It was founded in 1939 as a mining settlement and was granted town status in 1963.

== Administrative and municipal status ==
Within the framework of administrative divisions, Tashtagol serves as the administrative center of Tashtagolsky District, even though is not a part of it. As an administrative division, it is incorporated separately as Tashtagol Town Under Oblast Jurisdiction—an administrative unit with a status equal to that of the districts. As a municipal division, Tashtagol Town Under Oblast Jurisdiction is incorporated within Tashtagolsky Municipal District as Tashtagolskoye Urban Settlement.

== Population ==
Population: 23,134 (2010 census); 23,363 (2002 census); 26,274 (1989 Soviet census).

== Public Transports ==
The city has a small heliport with a 650 × 25 m runway, operated by Aerokuzbass. have tashtagol - ust' anzas - shortayga - elbeza - mrassu - tashtagol passenger helicopter flight, using Mil Mi-8.
