= Tisulsky District =

Tisulsky District Тисульский район (Russian)
- District
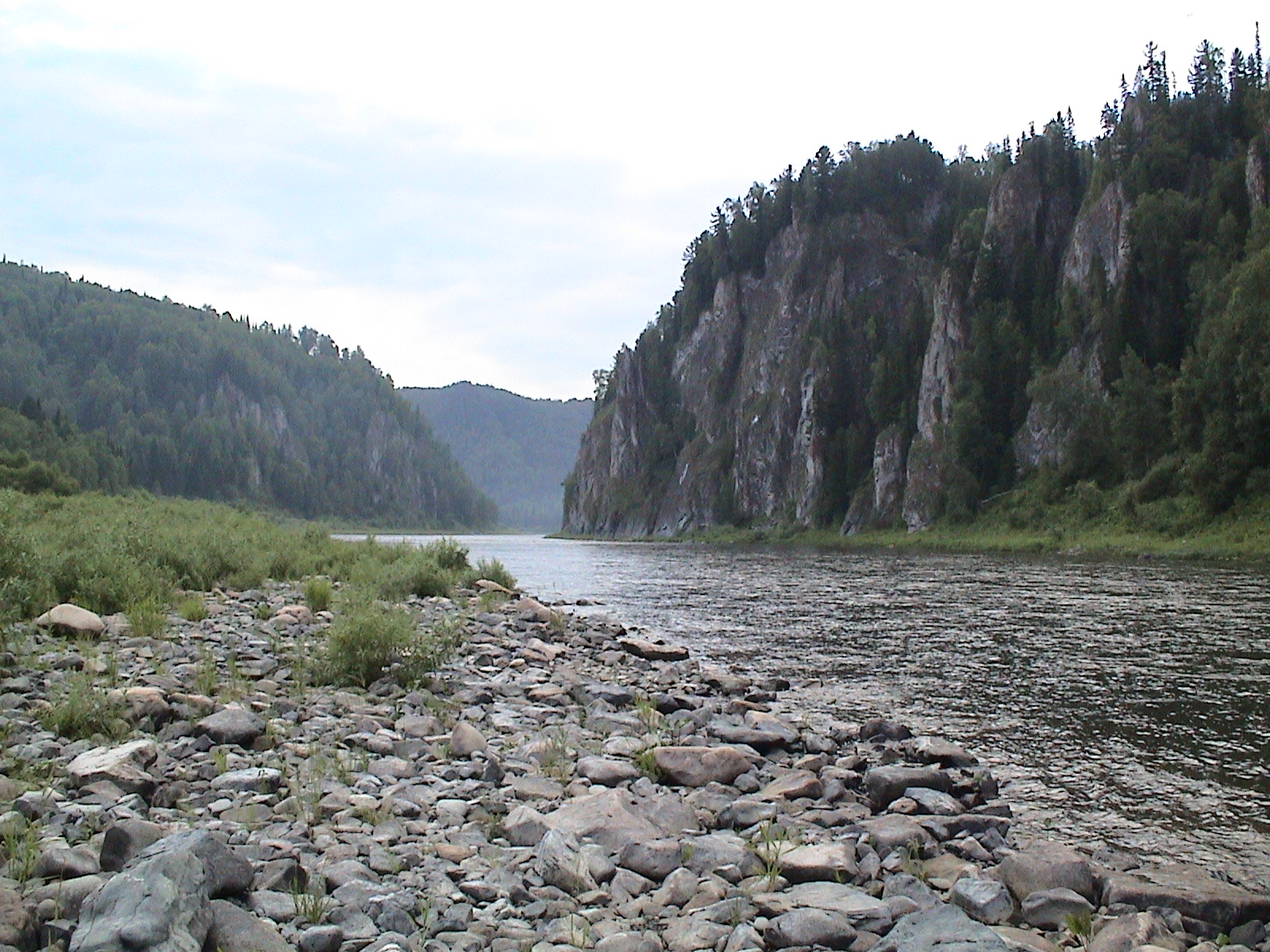
- The Kiya River near the settlement of Moskovka in Tisulsky District

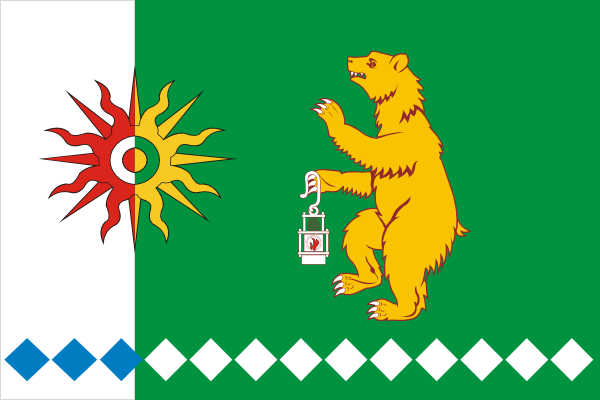
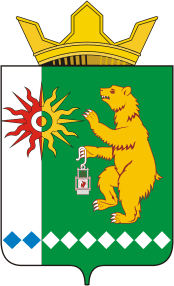
- Flag Coat of arms
- Location of Tisulsky District in Kemerovo Oblast
- Coordinates: 55°48′N 88°18′E
- Country: Russia
- Federal subject: Kemerovo Oblast
- Established: 1924
- Administrative center: Tisul

Area
  - Total: 8,100 km^{2} (3,100 sq mi)

Population (2010 Census)
  - Total: 25,045
  - Density: 3.1/km^{2} (8.0/sq mi)
  - Urban: 58.4%
  - Rural: 41.6%

Administrative structure
  - Administrative divisions: 3 Urban-type settlements, 10 Rural territories
  - Inhabited localities: 3 urban-type settlements, 34 rural localities

Municipal structure
  - Municipally incorporated as: Tisulsky Municipal District
  - Municipal divisions: 3 urban settlements, 10 rural settlements
- Time zone: UTC+7 (MSK+4)
- OKTMO ID: 32628000
- Website: http://www.tisul.ru/

Tisulsky District (Russian: Тисульский райо́н) is an administrative district (raion), one of the nineteen in Kemerovo Oblast, Russia. As a municipal division, it is incorporated as Tisulsky Municipal District. It is located in the east of the oblast. The area of the district is 8,100 square kilometers (3,100 sq mi). Its administrative center is the urban locality (an urban-type settlement) of Tisul. Population: 25,045 (2010 census); 28,471 (2002 Census); 34,707 (1989 Soviet census). The population of Tisul accounts for 36.1% of the district's total population.

== Geography ==
The district is in the northeast of Kemerovo Oblast, and the Kuznetsk Basin, and covers the northern end of the Kuznetsk Alatau mountain range. The Kuznetsk Alatau is the source of many rivers and streams that flow north to the Kiya River, and eventually the Tom River. Much of the terrain is mid-height mountains, with the southern portion of the district being part of a federally protected area, the Kuznetsk Alatau Nature Reserve. Vegetation is mostly dark taiga (coniferous forest).The district is about 250 km east of the regional city of Kemerovo.

Tisulsky District borders with Tyazhinsky District in the north, Krapivinsky District in the south, and with Chebulinsky District in the west.
