= Tashtagolsky District =

Tashtagolsky District Таштагольский район (Russian)
- District
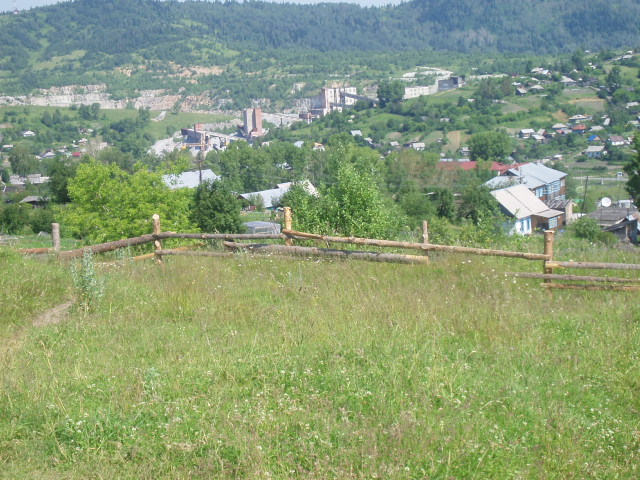
- The urban-type settlement of Temirtau in Tashtagolsky District

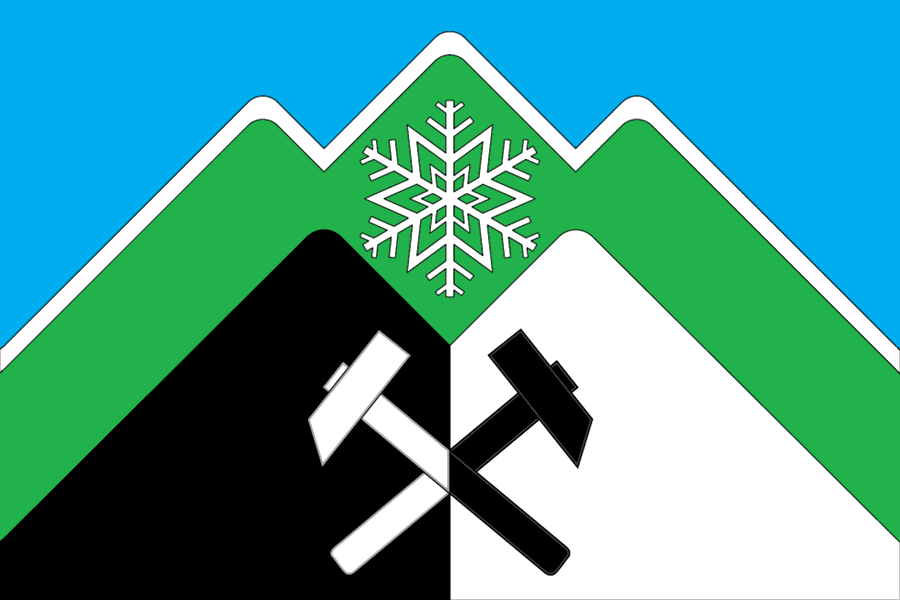
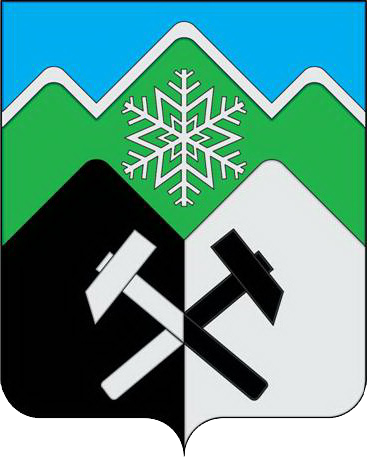
- Flag Coat of arms
- Location of Tashtagolsky District in Kemerovo Oblast
- Coordinates: 52°46′00″N 87°52′00″E
- Country: Russia
- Federal subject: Kemerovo Oblast
- Established: 1939
- Administrative center: Tashtagol

Area
  - Total: 11,383 km^{2} (4,395 sq mi)

Population (2010 Census)
  - Total: 31,895
  - Density: 2.8020/km^{2} (7.2571/sq mi)
  - Urban: 81.4%
  - Rural: 18.6%

Administrative structure
  - Administrative divisions: 5 Urban-type settlements, 4 Rural territories
  - Inhabited localities: 5 urban-type settlements, 88 rural localities

Municipal structure
  - Municipally incorporated as: Tashtagolsky Municipal District
  - Municipal divisions: 6 urban settlements, 4 rural settlements
- Time zone: UTC+7 (MSK+4)
- OKTMO ID: 32627000
- Website: http://atr.my1.ru/

Tashtagolsky District (Russian: Таштаго́льский райо́н) is an administrative district (raion), one of the nineteen in Kemerovo Oblast, Russia. As a municipal division, it is incorporated as Tashtagolsky Municipal District. It is located in the south of the oblast. The area of the district is 11,383 square kilometers (4,395 sq mi). Its administrative center is the town of Tashtagol (which is not administratively a part of the district). Population: 31,895 (2010 census); 34,545 (2002 Census); 37,816 (1989 Soviet census).

== Administrative and municipal status ==
Within the framework of administrative divisions, Tashtagolsky District is one of the nineteen in the oblast. The town of Tashtagol serves as its administrative center, despite being incorporated separately as a town under oblast jurisdiction—an administrative unit with the status equal to that of the districts.

As a municipal division, the district is incorporated as Tashtagolsky Municipal District, with Tashtagol Town Under Oblast Jurisdiction being incorporated within it as Tashtagolskoye Urban Settlement.

== Population ==
Ethnic composition (2010):.

- Russians – 87.9%
- Shors – 8.3%
- Germans – 1%
- others – 2.8%

== People ==
- Ivan Yarygin (1948-1997)
