= List of rural localities in Kemerovo Oblast =

Map of Russia with Kemerovo Oblast highlighted

This is a list of rural localities in Kemerovo Oblast. Kemerovo Oblast (Russian: Ке́меровская о́бласть, Kemerovskaya oblast, pronounced [ˈkʲemʲɪrəfskəjə ˈobləsʲtʲ]) is a federal subject of Russia (an oblast), located in southwestern Siberia, where the West Siberian Plain meets the South Siberian Mountains. Kemerovo is the administrative center of the oblast. The population recorded during the 2010 Census was 2,763,135.

== Leninsk-Kuznetsky District ==
Rural localities in Leninsk-Kuznetsky District:

- 189 km

== Mariinsky District ==
Rural localities in Mariinsky District:

- 10th razezd

== Novokuznetsky District ==
Rural localities in Novokuznetsky District:

- 360 km
- 75th Piket

== Promyshlennovsky District ==
Rural localities in Promyshlennovsky District:

- Abyshevo

== Tashtagolsky District ==
Rural localities in Tashtagolsky District:

- 517 km
- 527 km
- 534 km
- 545 km

== Topkinsky District ==
Rural localities in Topkinsky District:

- 130 km
- 64 km
- 79 km

== Yurginsky District, Kemerovo Oblast ==
Rural localities in Yurginsky District, Kemerovo Oblast:

- 23 km
- 31 km
- 54 km

== See also ==
- Lists of rural localities in Russia
