= 527 (disambiguation) =

527 may refer to:

- 527 AD
- 527 BC
- 527 (number)
- 527 organization, a type of U.S. tax-exempt organization
- CZ 527, a bolt-action smallbore rifle
- Fiat 527, a passenger car
- 527 km, a rural locality in Kalarskoye Rural Settlement of Tashtagolsky District, Russia
- SCR-527, a medium-range radar used by the United States
- Avro 527, a two-seat fighter aircraft

== See also ==
- Flight 527
- List of highways numbered 527
