= Fiat 518 =

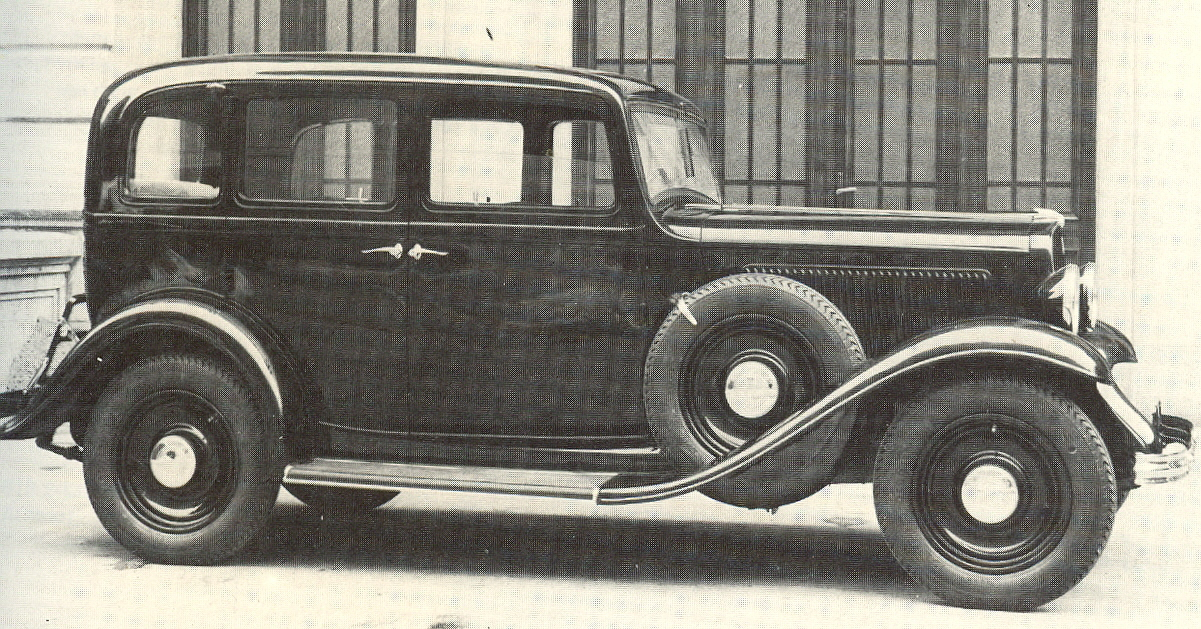
- Fiat 518 C saloon

Overview
- Manufacturer: Fiat
- Also called: Fiat Ardita
- Production: 1933–1938

Body and chassis
- Class: Executive car
- Body style: 4-door saloon; 4-door torpedo; 4-door sports saloon
- Layout: Front-engine, rear-wheel-drive
- Related: Fiat 527 (Ardita 2500)

Powertrain
- Engine: 1,758 cc I4 (Ardita); 1,944 cc I4 (Ardita 2000 and Sport)
- Transmission: 4-speed manual

Dimensions
- Wheelbase: 2,700 mm (106.3 in) (518 C); 3,000 mm (118.1 in) (518 L)
- Length: 4,035 mm (158.9 in) (518 C saloon); 4,335 mm (170.7 in) (518 L saloon)
- Kerb weight: 1,185–1,259 kg (2,612–2,776 lb) (518 C and 518 L saloons)

Chronology
- Predecessor: Fiat 514
- Successor: Fiat 1500

The Fiat 518, also called Fiat Ardita, was a model of car produced by Italian car manufacturer Fiat between 1933 and 1938. The name "Ardita" was also used on the six-cylinder engined and more expensive Fiat Ardita 2500 or 527.

In total 8,794 518s were produced by Fiat. Additionally the 518 was produced outside Italy: in France by Simca as Simca-Fiat 11 CV, and in Poland by Polski Fiat as well as by PZInż under licence.

== Models ==
=== Ardita and Ardita 2000 ===
The Ardita with available two chassis, having different wheelbases. Furthermore, there was a choice of two engines, the standard 1.8-litre (Ardita, also known as Ardita 1750) and a 2.0-litre version (Ardita 2000).

The short 2,700 mm (106.3 in) wheelbase chassis was coded 518 C (for corta, short) and the long (3,000 mm or 118.1 in one 518 L (for lunga, long). Suspension and braking were fairly conventional, with solid axles front and rear, hydraulic dampers, hydraulic drum brakes on all four wheels and a band handbrake on the transmission. The 518 L chassis was fitted with wider tyres (5.50×17″ instead of 5.25×17″) and a different final drive ratio from the 518 C. Both the 518 C and 518 L were offered from the factory with 4-door saloon and 4-door torpedo bodies. Therefore, the factory body styles available for the standard Ardita and the Ardita 2000 were:

- Saloon, 4 doors, 7 seats, long chassis
- Saloon, 4 doors, 5 seats, short chassis
- Torpedo, 4 doors, long chassis
- Torpedo, 4 doors, short chassis

The saloons had 6 side windows, lacked a centre pillar and had suicide doors at the rear.

The Ardita's type 118 inline-four sidevalve engine had a bore and stroke of 78 mm × 92 mm (3.1 in × 3.6 in) and displaced 1,758 cc (107.3 cu in). With a 6.2:1 compression ratio and a single Zenith 36 VIF carburettor it produced 40 PS (29 kW; 39 hp). Top speed was 100 and 98 km/h (62 and 61 mph) respectively for the 518 C and 518 L saloons. The Ardita 2000's type 118 A was obtained from the smaller engine by enlarging its bore to 82 mm (3.2 in) (bore and stroke 82×92 mm), displacing 1,944 cc (118.6 cu in). With unchanged compression ratio and carburettor it produced 45 PS (33 kW; 44 hp) at 3,600 rpm. Top speed was about 105 km/h (65 mph).

| Model | Engine | Displacement | Power | Fuel system |
|---|---|---|---|---|
| 1750 | Inline-four sidevalve | 1,758 cc | 40 PS (29 kW; 39 hp) | single carburettor |
| 2000 | Inline-four sidevalve | 1,944 cc | 45 PS (33 kW; 44 hp) at 3,600 rpm | single carburettor |
| 2000 Sport | Inline-four sidevalve | 1,944 cc | 54 PS (40 kW; 53 hp) at 3,800 rpm | single carburettor |

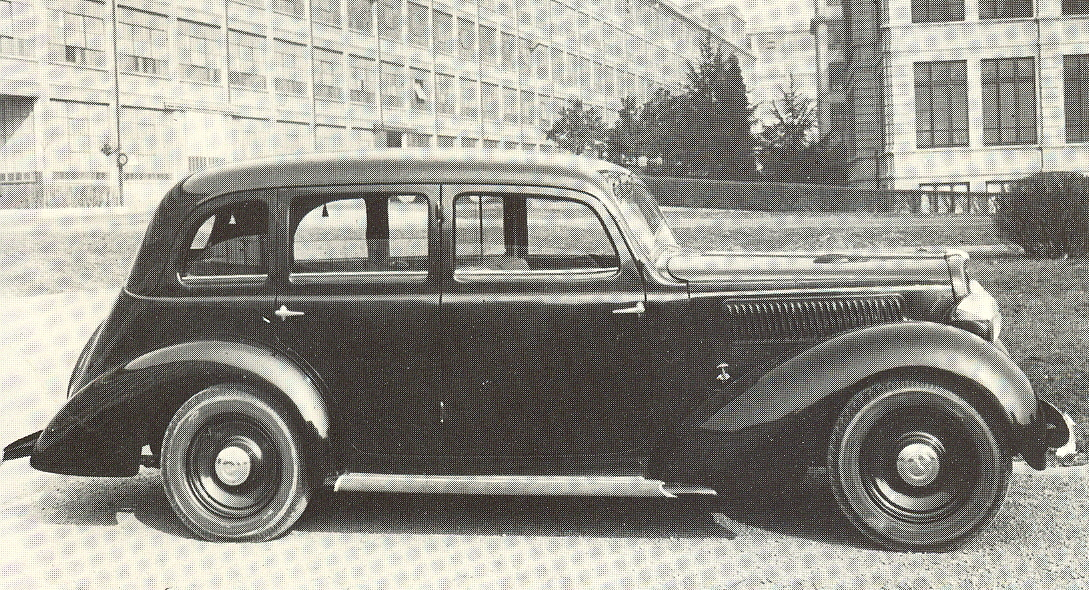
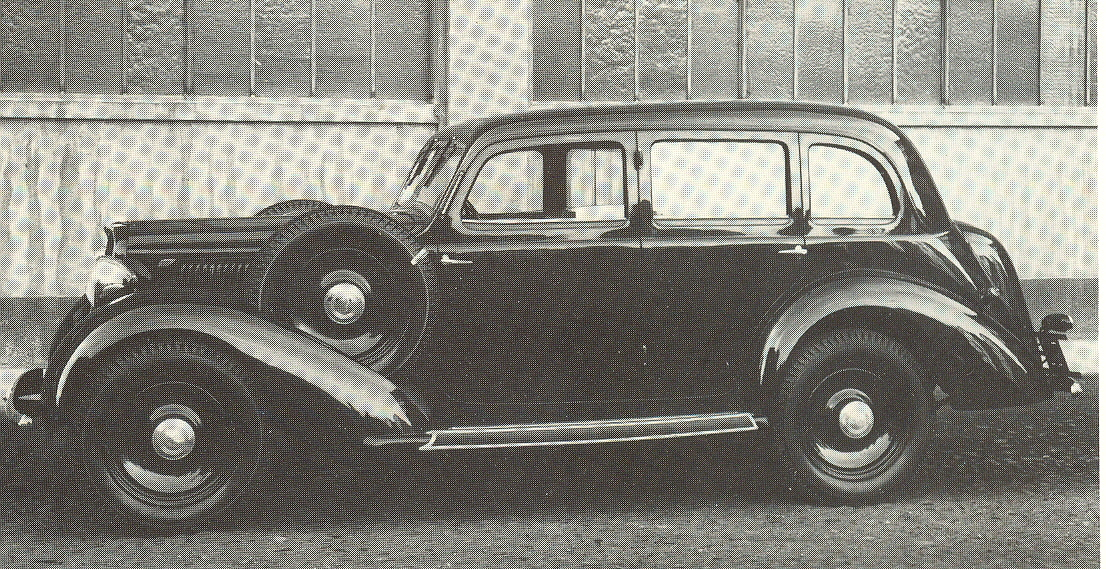
1933 Fiat 518 L saloon, standard (top) and Coloniale (bottom)

=== Ardita Coloniale ===
The Ardita Coloniale was a variant of the Ardita 2000 for use in the Italian colonies or by the military. In order to negotiate rougher terrains it had larger wheels and tyres and a shorter final drive ratio, leading to a reduced top speed of 85 km/h (53 mph). The Coloniale was produced both with short and long wheelbase, as well as with both saloon and torpedo bodies.

=== Ardita Sport ===
The Fiat Ardita Sport was a more powerful variant of the Ardita 2000 using the short-wheelbase (2.7 m) chassis. It was offered from the factory solely as a 4-door, 4-window pillarless sports saloon, with four seats and an external luggage compartment integrated in the body. It was fitted as standard with wire wheels, and the spare wheel was carried at the rear. The Ardita Sport's type 118 AS 1,944 cc engine produced 54 PS (40 kW; 53 hp) at 3,800 rpm, and pushed the car to a top speed of 115 km/h (71 mph).

== Production outside Italy ==
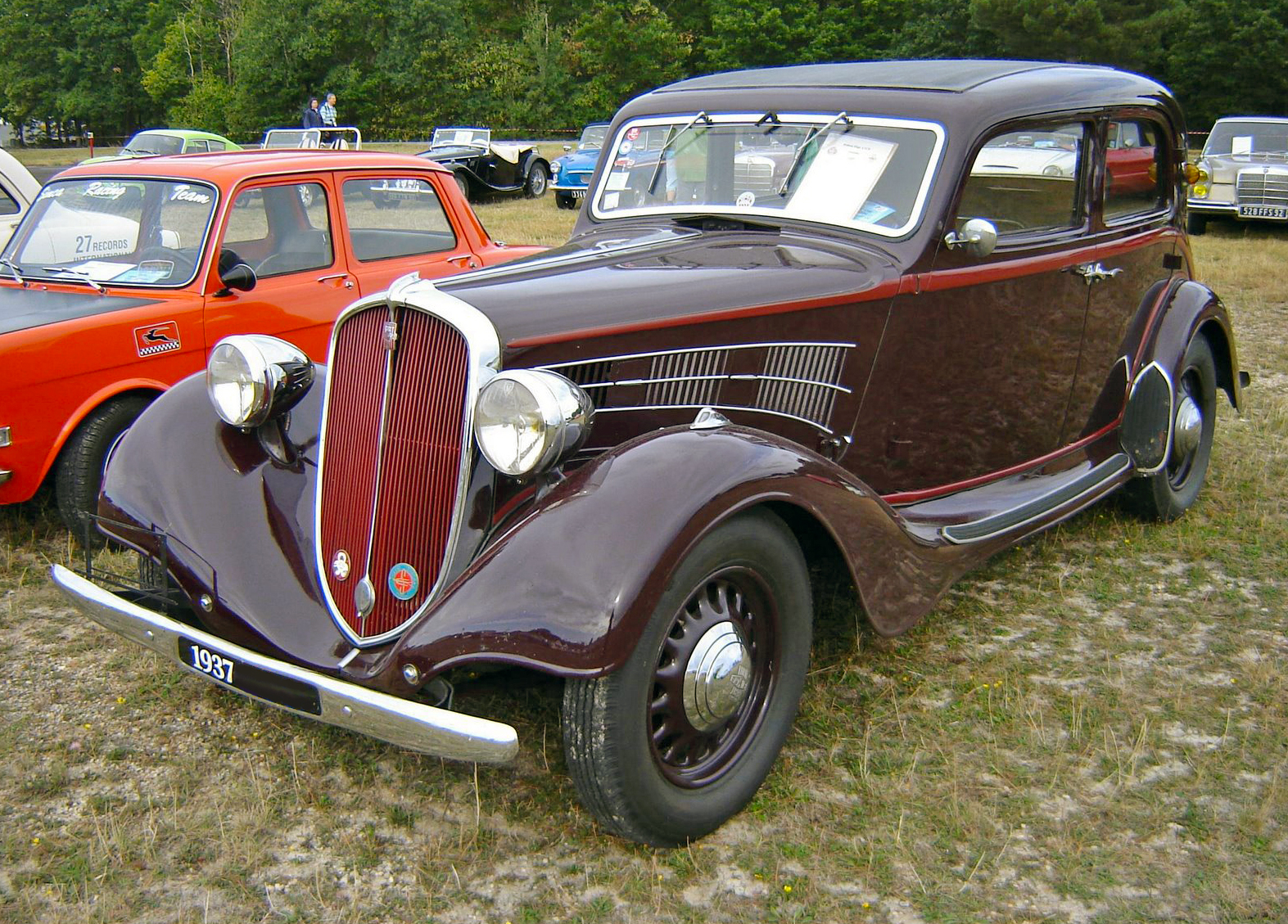
1937 Simca-Fiat 11 CV

=== Simca-Fiat ===
About 2,200 were built as Simca-Fiat 11 CVs in France, all fitted with the 1,944 cc engine of 45 PS (33 kW; 44 hp). It was Simca's last executive car until the release of the Simca Vedette in 1954.

=== In Poland ===
A Polish version, the Polski Fiat 518 Mazur was produced between 1937 and 1939 by PZInż in Warszawa under Fiat license. The car has 4 doors and 7 or 5 seats. It used the two-litre Fiat 118 engine (PZInż 157) (45 hp (33 kW) at 3,600 rpm, compression rate of 6,1:1) and a four-speed gearbox. The car weighs 1,070 kg (2,359 lb) and has top speed of 100 to 110 km/h (62 to 68 mph) and has fuel consumption of 11.5 L/100 km (25 mpg_{‑imp}; 20.5 mpg_{‑US}). The 518-derived PZInż 302 was used as artillery tractor by the Polish military.
