= Topkinsky =

Topkinsky (masculine), Topkinskaya (feminine), or Topkinskoye (neuter) may refer to:

- Topkinsky District, a district of Kemerovo Oblast, Russia
- Topkinskoye Urban Settlement, a municipal formation within Topkinsky Municipal District which Topki Town Under Oblast Jurisdiction in Kemerovo Oblast, Russia is incorporated as
- Topkinskaya, a rural locality (a village) in Tyumen Oblast, Russia
