= 130 km =

Rural locality in Topinsky District, Kemerovo Oblast, Russia

130 km 130 км
- Passing loop
- Location within Kemerovo Oblast Location within Russia
- Coordinates: 55.139444°N 85.797778°E
- Country: Russia
- Region: Kemerovo Oblast
- District: Topkinsky District
- Time zone: UTC+7:00

130 km (Russian: 130 км) is a rural locality (a passing loop) in Cheremichkinskoye Rural Settlement of Topkinsky District, Russia. The population was 47 as of 2010.

== Geography ==
The passing loop is located on the Yurga-Tashtagol line, 37 km south of Topki (the district's administrative centre) by road. Treshchevsky is the nearest rural locality.

== Streets ==
- Zheleznodorozhnaya
