= 54 km =

Rural locality in Yurginsky District, Kemerovo Oblast, Russia

54 km 54 км
- Passing loop
- Location within Kemerovo Oblast Location within Russia
- Coordinates: 55.468333°N 85.042778°E
- Country: Russia
- Region: Kemerovo Oblast
- District: Yurginsky District
- Time zone: UTC+7:00

54 km (Russian: 54 км) is a rural locality (a passing loop) in Poperechenskoye Rural Settlement of Yurginsky District, Russia. The population was 39 as of 2012.

== Geography ==
The passing loop is located on the Yurga-Tashtagol line, 44 km south of Yurga (the district's administrative centre) by road. Poperechnoye is the nearest rural locality.

== Streets ==
- Vokzalnaya
- Dorozhnaya
