= Topki =

Topki (Russian: Топки) is the name of several inhabited localities in Russia.

Urban localities

- Topki (town), Kemerovo Oblast, a town in Kemerovo Oblast; 55°20′N 85°45′E

Rural localities

- Topki (rural locality), Kemerovo Oblast, a selo in Topkinskaya Rural Territory of Topkinsky District in Kemerovo Oblast; 55°20′N 85°46′E
- Topki, Lipetsk Oblast, a selo in Topovsky Selsoviet of Lev-Tolstovsky District in Lipetsk Oblast
- Topki, Oryol Oblast, a selo in Topkovsky Selsoviet of Pokrovsky District in Oryol Oblast
- Topki, Tula Oblast, a settlement in Velminskaya Rural Administration of Uzlovsky District in Tula Oblast
