= 23 km =

Rural locality in Yurginsky District, Kemerovo Oblast, Russia

23 km 23 км
- Passing loop
- Location within Kemerovo Oblast Location within Russia
- Coordinates: 55.535556°N 84.784444°E
- Country: Russia
- Region: Kemerovo Oblast
- District: Yurginsky District
- Time zone: UTC+07:00

23 km (Russian: 23 км) is a rural locality (a passing loop) in Yurginskoye Rural Settlement of Yurginsky District, Russia. The population was 21 as of 2010.

== Streets ==
- Zheleznodorozhnaya

== Geography ==
23 km is located 31 km south of Yurga (the district's administrative centre) by road. Logovoy is the nearest rural locality.
