= 64 km =

Rural locality in Topinsky District, Kemerovo Oblast, Russia

64 km 64 км
- Passing loop
- Location within Kemerovo Oblast Location within Russia
- Coordinates: 55.4175°N 85.169444°E
- Country: Russia
- Region: Kemerovo Oblast
- District: Topkinsky District
- Time zone: UTC+7:00

64 km (Russian: 64 км) is a rural locality (a passing loop) in Shishinskoye Rural Settlement of Topkinsky District, Russia. The population was 12 as of 2010.

== Streets ==
- Lineinaya

== Geography ==
64 km is located 51 km northwest of Topki (the district's administrative centre) by road. Listvyanka is the nearest rural locality.
