= 31 km =

Rural locality in Yurginsky District, Kemerovo Oblast, Russia

31 km 31 км
- Passing loop
- Location within Kemerovo Oblast Location within Russia
- Coordinates: 55.468889°N 84.758056°E
- Country: Russia
- Region: Kemerovo Oblast
- District: Yurginsky District
- Time zone: UTC+07:00

31 km (Russian: 31 км) is a rural locality (a passing loop) in Arlyukskoye Rural Settlement of Yurginsky District, Russia. The population was 70 as of 2010. There is one street.

== Geography ==
31 km is located 47 km south of Yurga (the district's administrative centre) by road. Lineyny is the nearest rural locality.
