= Abyshevo, Kemerovo Oblast =

Abyshevo Абышево
- Village
- Location within Kemerovo Oblast Location within Russia
- Coordinates: 55°03′N 84°59′E
- Country: Russia
- Region: Kemerovo Oblast
- District: Promyshlennovsky District
- Time zone: UTC+7:00

Abyshevo (Russian: Абышево) is a rural locality (a selo) in Padunskoye Rural Settlement of Promyshlennovsky District, Kemerovo Oblast, Russia. The population was 731 as of 2010. There are 8 streets.

== Geography ==
Abyshevo is located 48 km northwest of Promyshlennaya (the district's administrative centre) by road. Padunskaya is the nearest rural locality.
