= 79 km =

Rural locality in Topinsky District, Kemerovo Oblast, Russia

79 km 79 км
- Passing loop
- Location within Kemerovo Oblast Location within Russia
- Coordinates: 55.315278°N 85.313611°E
- Country: Russia
- Region: Kemerovo Oblast
- District: Topkinsky District
- Time zone: UTC+7:00

79 km (Russian: 79 км) is a rural locality (a passing loop) in Shishinskoye Rural Settlement of Topkinsky District, Russia. The population was 26 as of 2010.

== Streets ==
- Zheleznodorozhnaya

== Geography ==
79 km is located 36 km west of Topki (the district's administrative centre) by road. Klyuchevoy is the nearest rural locality.
