= Executive car =

British term for a large car

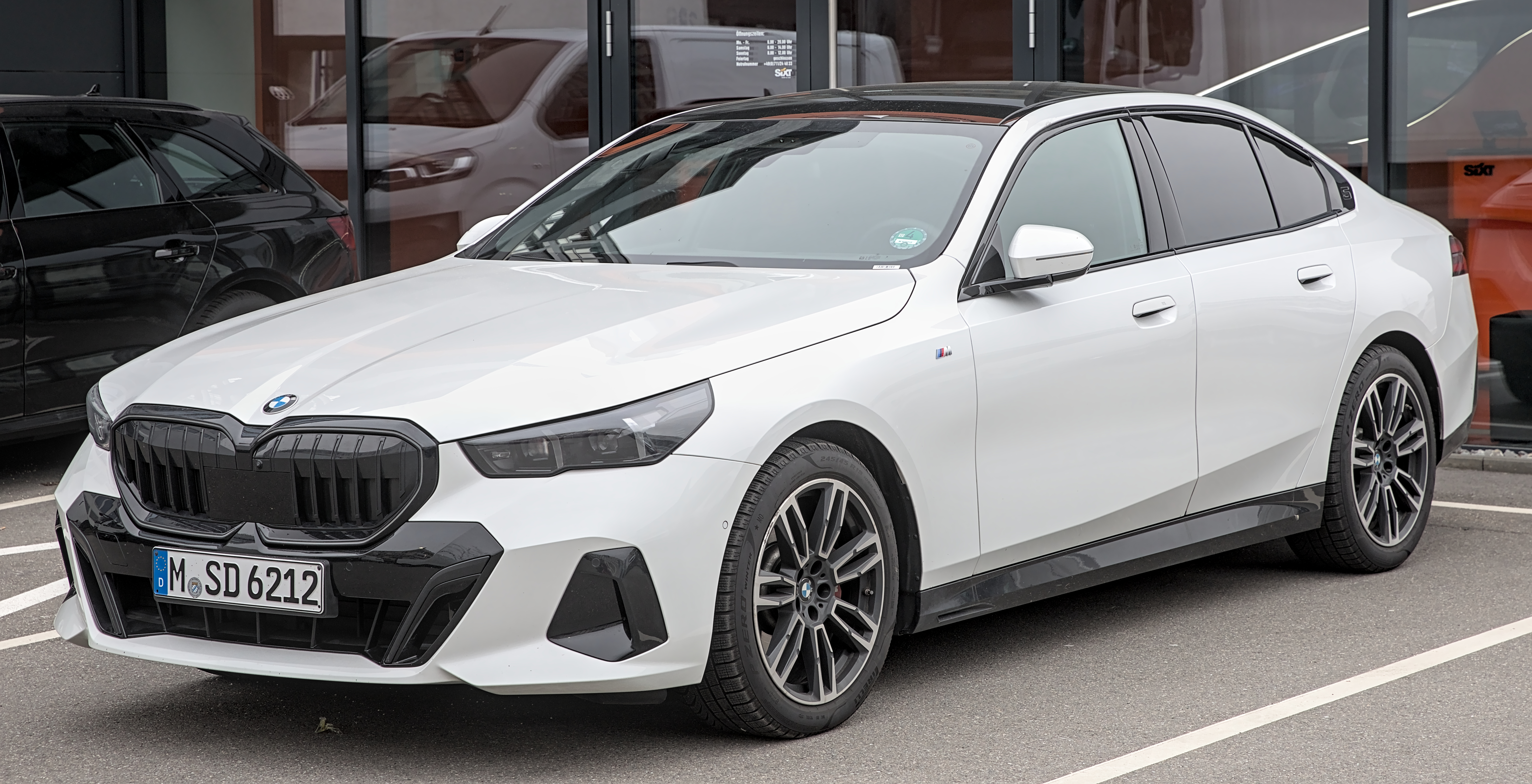
2024 BMW 5 Series

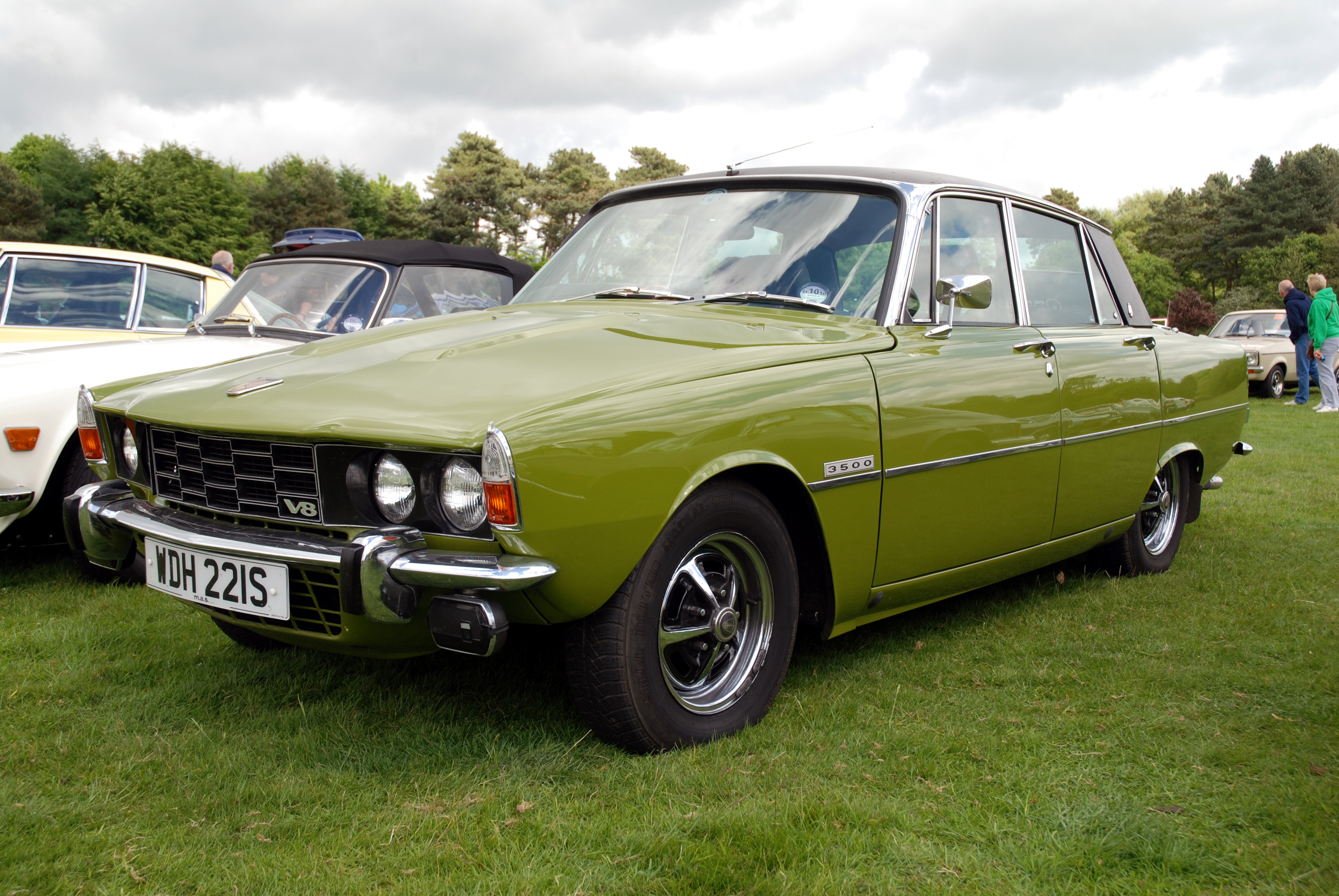
1977 Rover 3500

Executive car is a British term for a large car, and is considered equivalent to the European E-segment and American full-size classifications. Executive cars are larger than compact executive cars (and the non-luxury equivalent mid-size cars), but smaller than luxury saloons / full-size luxury sedans.

The term has also been adopted by Euro NCAP, a European organization founded to test car safety.

== Background ==
The term was coined in the 1960s to describe cars targeted at successful professionals and middle-to-senior managers. It was used by businesses as an incentive for employees in senior roles and to exploit Britain and Europe's tax schemes as a company-owned vehicle. Early executive cars typically offered engines with displacements of 2.0–3.5 L (122–214 cu in), compared with 1.6–2.4 L (98–146 cu in) for an equivalent sized—but less luxurious—"large family car".

Prior to the 1990s, executive cars were typically sedans; however, in recent years, they have also been produced in other body styles, such as estates (station wagons), convertibles, coupés, and five-door hatch versions. They typically need to be "comfortable, refined and display some form of driving pleasure" on occasion.

== Body styles ==
In general, executive cars are 4-door saloons, though may include estate, 5-door hatchback or 2-door coupé variants. Rover, Saab, Renault and Citroën formerly have been known to prefer hatchbacks, with Ford also offering alternatives through the 1990s. Audi, BMW and later Mercedes-AMG have recently offered hatchbacks as separate models for their executive cars since 2010s.

== Production by country ==
=== China ===
One of the first Chinese-built executive cars was the 2006 Roewe 750, based on the Rover 75. In 2012, the Roewe 950 was introduced, which is a re-bodied version of the 2010 Buick LaCrosse. In 2020, BYD Han officially went on sale in China.

Several overseas brands have produced long wheelbase versions of cars specifically for the Chinese market, due to the preference Chinese owners have for being driven by a chauffeur. Examples include the "XF L" version of the 2016 Jaguar XF (X260), the "Li" version of the 2017 BMW 5 Series (G30) and other models from Audi, Mercedes-Benz, and Volvo.

=== France ===
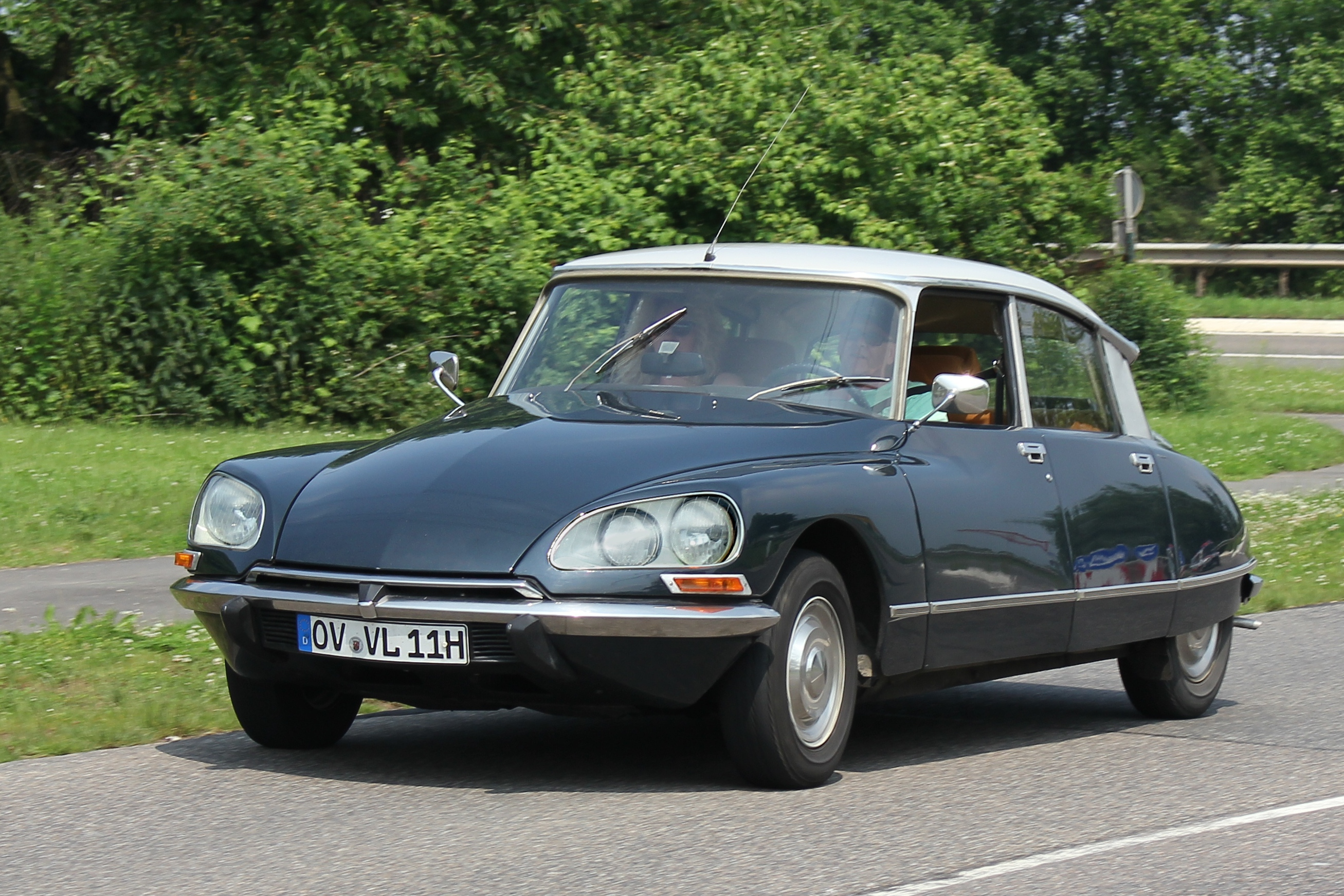
1974 Citroën DS 20

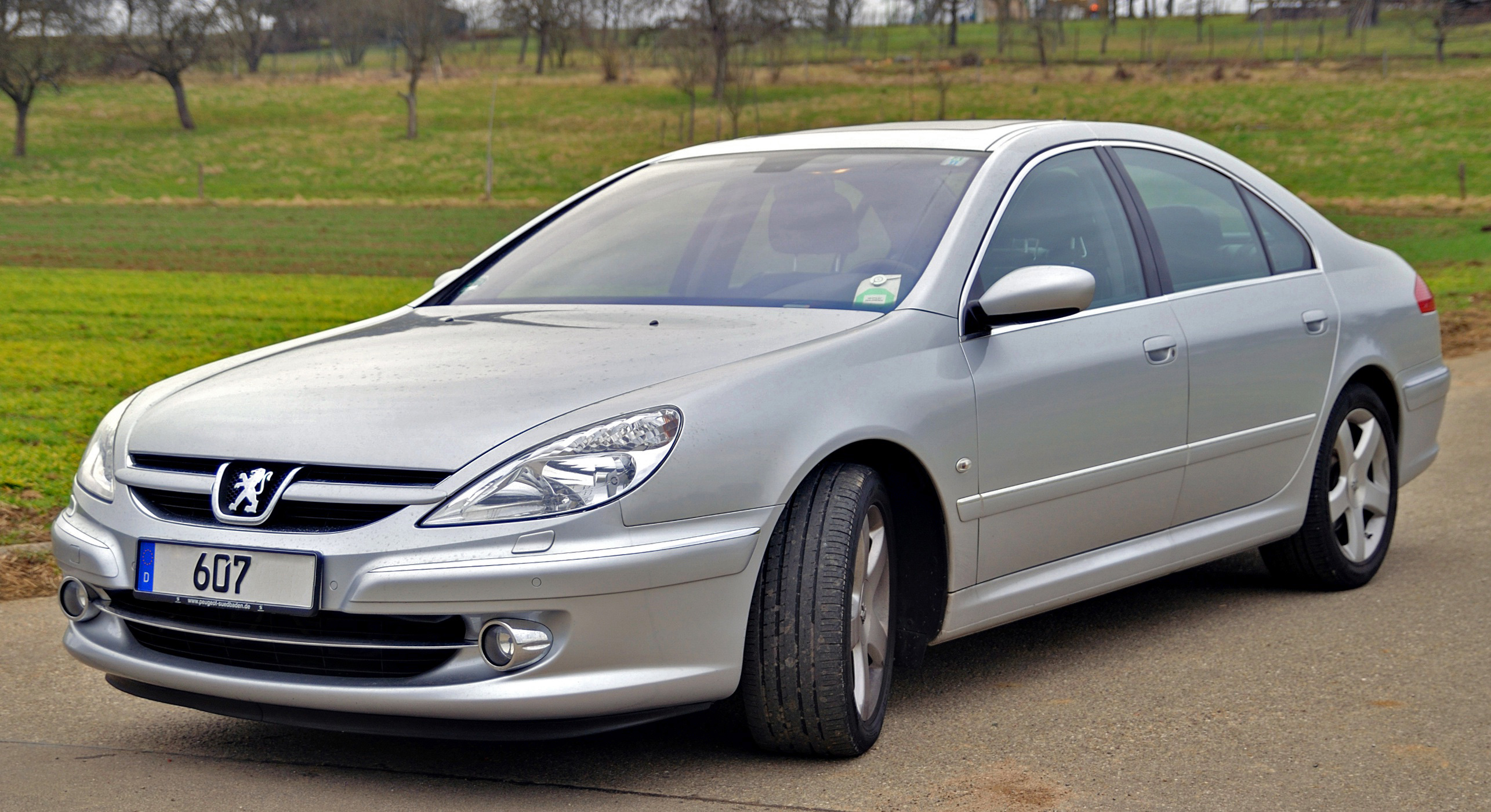
Peugeot 607 (1999–2010)

In France, executive cars are known as "Routière", a class of comfortable long-distance cars that first emerged on the French market in the 1930s.

Peugeot began producing large cars in the early 1900s. Following the Peugeot 601 being discontinued in 1935, Peugeot ceased production of large cars until the Peugeot 604 was introduced in 1975. The 604 was replaced by the Peugeot 605 in 1989, which in turn was replaced by the Peugeot 607 in 1999. Following the end of the 607's production run in 2010, Peugeot no longer produces any executive cars.

Citroën's first large car was the 1934 Citroën Traction Avant. In 1955, the Traction Avant was replaced by the iconic Citroën DS, which was replaced in 1974 by the Citroën CX and then the 1989 Citroën XM. The XM was discontinued in 2000 and for five years Citroën did not produce an executive car. The 2005 Citroën C6 was produced until 2012, and Citroën has not produced any executive cars since.

Renault entered the executive car segment in 1975 with the Renault 20/30 models. They were replaced, in 1983, by the Renault 25 which featured a fastback rear end. In 1992, the 25 was replaced by the Renault Safrane. The Safrane was replaced by the Renault Vel Satis hatchback in 2002, which in turn was replaced by the Latitude in 2010 and later the Talisman.

=== Germany ===
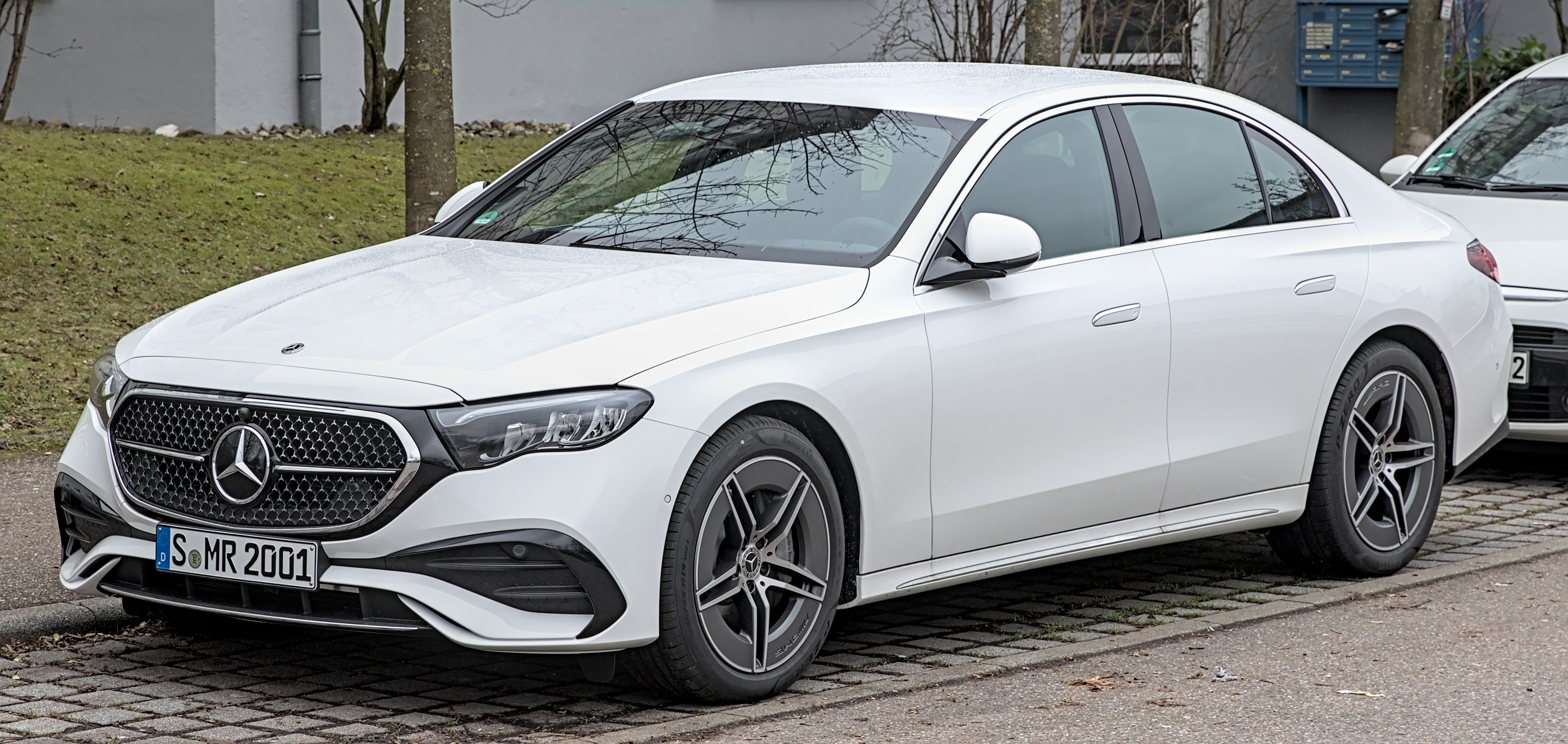
2025 Mercedes-Benz E-Class

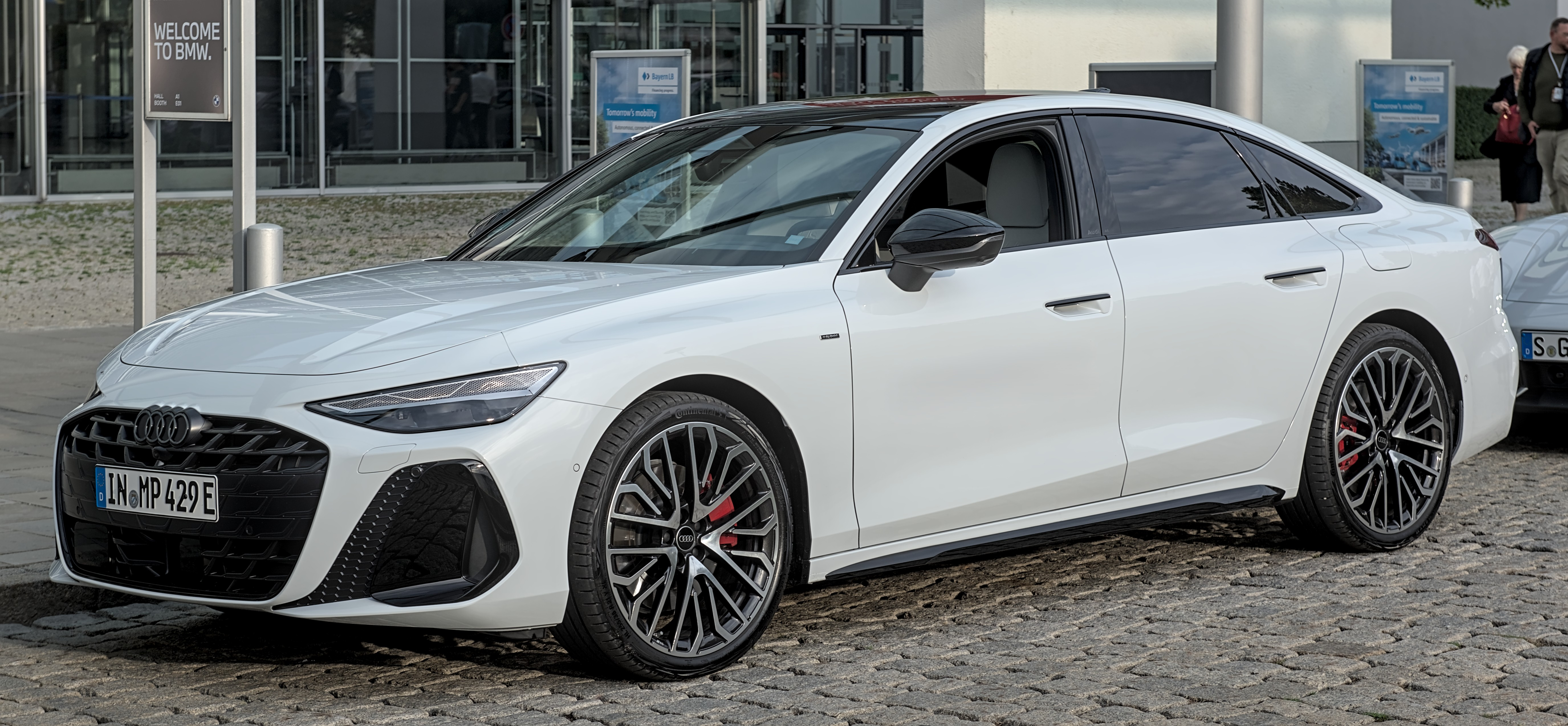
2025 Audi A6

The equivalent class for cars in Germany is "Obere Mittelklasse" (lit. upper-middle class) as defined by the German federal authorities. Luxury cars larger than this are referred to as Oberklasse ("upper class").

Mercedes-Benz has produced large luxury cars since the early 1900s. Following World War II, Mercedes Benz's first all-new models were the Mercedes-Benz W120 executive cars. This lineage continues through to the present and has been marketed as the Mercedes-Benz E-Class since 1993. The Mercedes-Benz CLS-Class four-door fastback was added to the company's model range in 2004, with a shooting brake body style also produced from 2012 to 2017.

BMW's first large luxury car was the 1936–1941 BMW 326. After a hiatus of 21 years, BMW's next executive car models were the 1962 New Class Sedans. In 1972, the New Class was replaced by the BMW 5 Series, which remains in production today. Over the seven generations of the 5 Series, it has been produced in sedan, wagon, and four-door hatchback body styles.

The first large luxury car produced by Audi was the Audi 100, which was released in 1968. The Audi 100 was replaced by the Audi A6 in 1994, which remains in production today. In 2010, the Audi A7 four-door fastback model range was added.

The Ford Granada is an executive car produced by Ford Europe from 1972 to 1994.

=== Italy ===
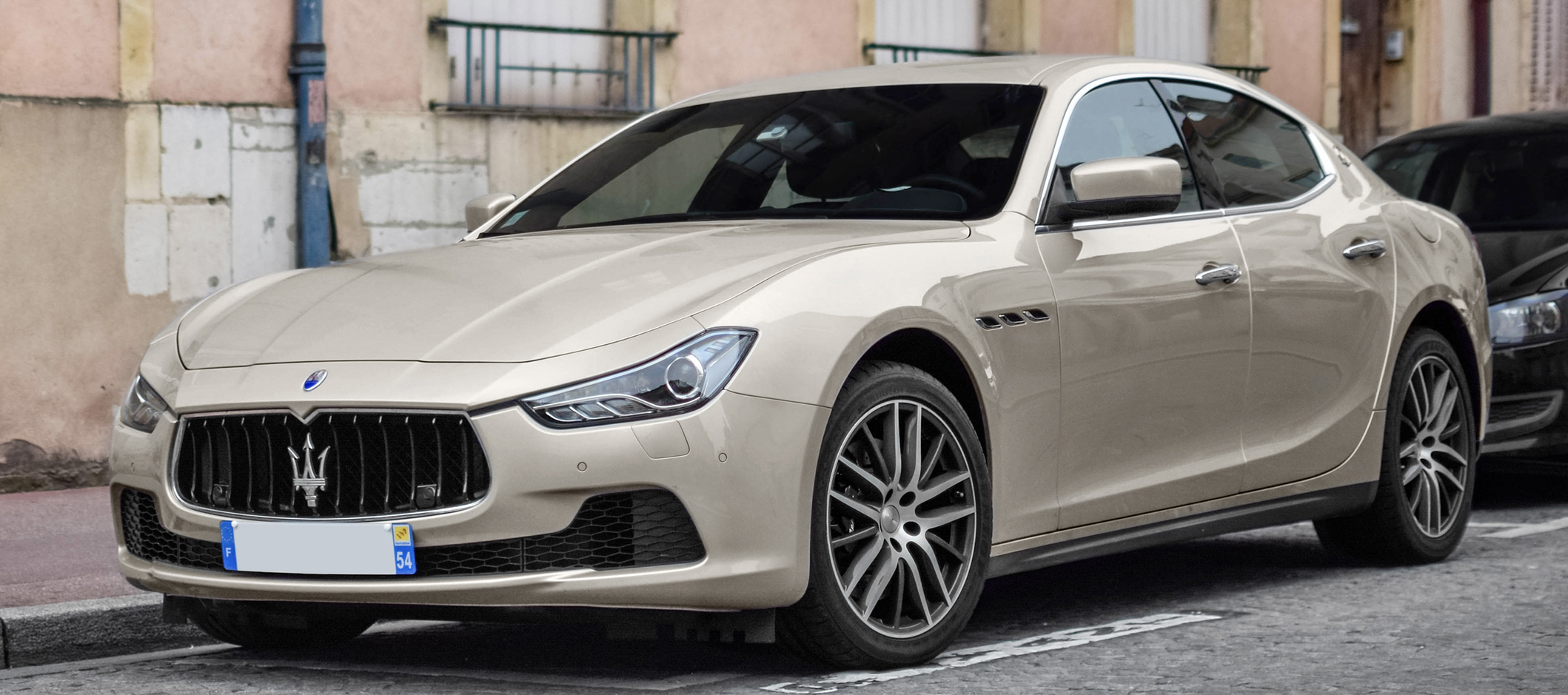
2013-2024 Maserati Ghibli

Fiat's first large luxury car was the Fiat 24-32 HP, which was introduced in 1903. Other large luxury Fiats produced before World War II include the Fiat 510, Fiat 520, Fiat 527, and Fiat 2800. In 1959, the Fiat 1800 and 2100 executive sedans and station wagons were introduced. These models were replaced by the Fiat 2300 in 1961. Fiat's last executive car was the Fiat 130, which was produced from 1969 until 1977.

Lancia produced several large luxury cars prior to World War II, including the Lancia Lambda, Lancia Artena, and Lancia Aprilia. The Lancia Flavia was an executive car that began production in 1961 and was replaced by the Lancia 2000 in 1971. The 2000 was replaced by the Lancia Gamma, which was released in 1976. In 1984, the Gamma was replaced by the Lancia Thema, then the Lancia Kappa in 1994. The Lancia Thesis, produced from 2001 to 2009 is the last executive car produced by Lancia. From 2011 to 2015, the Chrysler 300 was marketed in Europe as the Lancia Thema.

Maserati's first executive is the Maserati Ghibli, which has been in production since 2013.

=== Japan ===
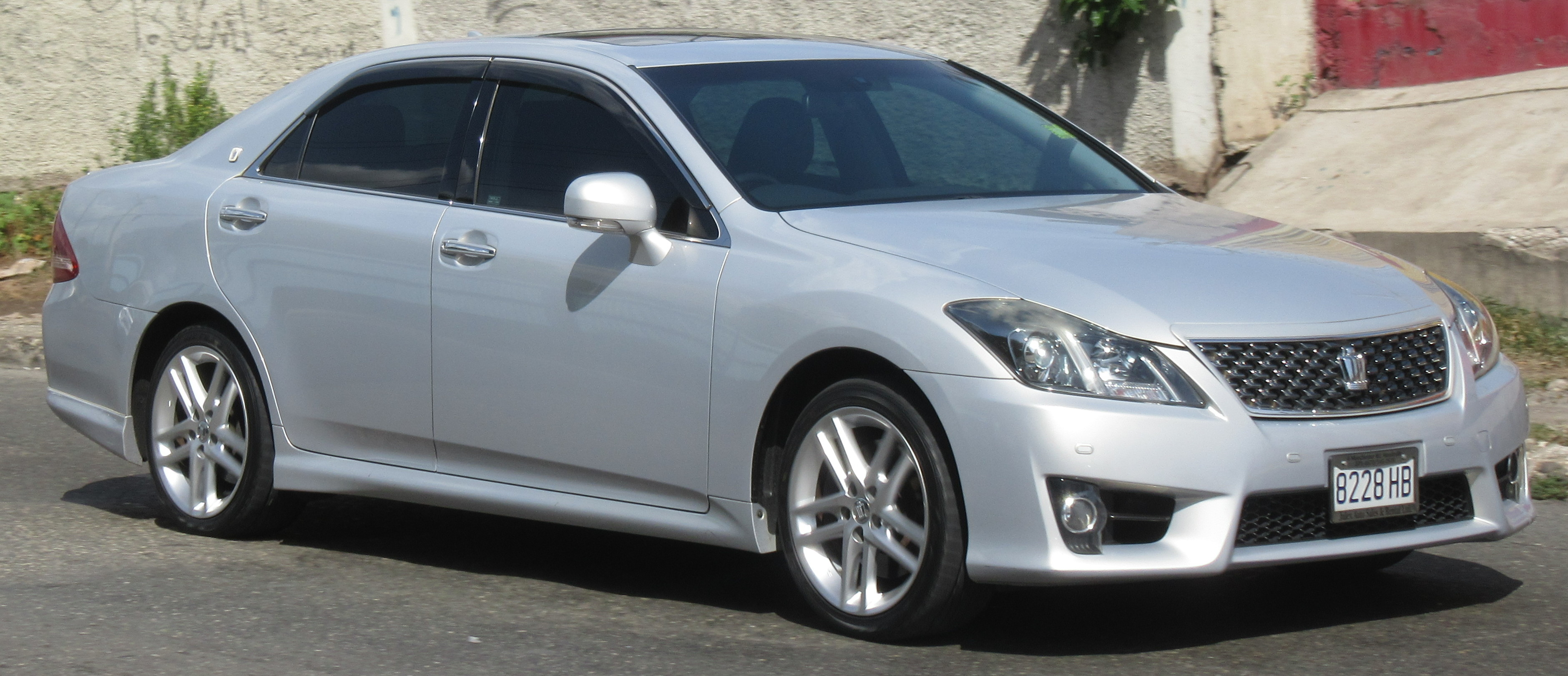
2010–2012 Toyota Crown Athlete

Toyota has been producing large luxury cars since the 1955 Crown was released. The Crown remains in production today and is currently in its fifteenth generation. In 1991, the Crown-derived Aristo began production, and from 1993 until 2020 were marketed under Toyota's luxury sub-brand as the Lexus GS.

Nissan's longest-running executive car began production in 1959 as the Prince Gloria, which was later renamed the Nissan Gloria, following the merger of Nissan and Prince. The Gloria was produced for 12 generations until 2004. Another Nissan executive car was the 1960 Cedric, which was produced until 2004 (although a taxi/fleet version remained in production until 2015). The Cedric was replaced by the 2004 Fuga, also sold as the Infiniti M from 2003 until 2012, and the Q70 since 2012.

Mitsubishi began producing executive cars in 1964 with the Debonair. The Debonair was replaced in 1999 by the Proudia, which was discontinued in 2001 and then returned from 2012 until 2016 as a rebadged Fuga.

Mazda's first executive car was the 1969 Luce. In 1991, the Luce was replaced by the Sentia, which was produced until 1999. The Millenia, also sold as the Xedos 9 and the Eunos 800, was produced from 1993 until 2002.

Honda introduced their first executive car, the Legend (sold as the Acura Legend in the United States) in 1985. The Legend was produced until 2012, and then from 2014 until 2021.

=== South Korea ===
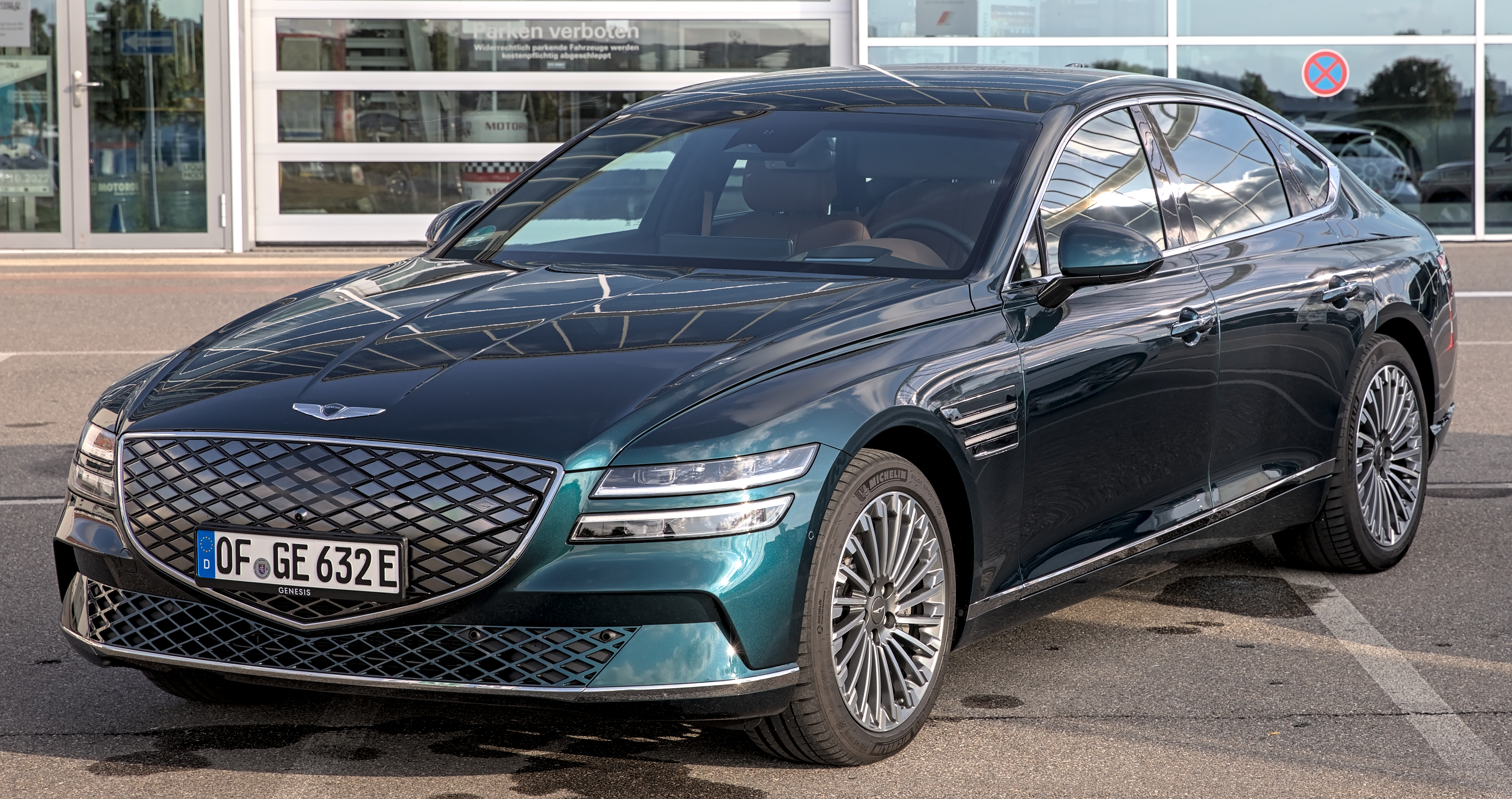
Genesis Electrified G80 (2021–2024)

It is believed that the standard of Korean Executive Cars came from the 3rd generation Hyundai Grandeur model launched in 1998. Previous models, Kia Potentia and Hyundai Grandeur, belonged to the large car position and were shopper-driven, but were relegated to owner-driven from the XG model. Afterward, the launch of Kia Opirus and Daewoo Magnus formed the semi-large car market.

In the 2000s, Daewoo Motors (now GM KOREA) sold the Holden Statesman under the name Daewoo Statesman from the Australian Holden company and sold the Holden Caprice as the follow-up model as the Daewoo Veritas. Afterwards, the Chevrolet Impala was launched, but was discontinued.

Renault Korea sold the SM7 based on the Nissan Teana from 2004 to 2020.

In the Korean market, semi-large cars boast significant sales volume as a symbol of the middle class, and the Hyundai Grandeur ranks high in sales in the Korean automobile market.

Currently, the semi-large business sedan models sold in the Korean market include Hyundai Grandeur and Kia K8, and the luxury brand is the Genesis G80.

=== Spain ===
SEAT's first executive car was the 1963–1973 SEAT 1500, then in 1973, it launched the 132 which was the same FIAT 131 of the era since all cars from the brand were produced under license from FIAT. It was produced until 1982 when it was replaced by the Málaga in 1984, which was the first to be produced in-house entirely, to be replaced afterward with the Toledo, in 1991.

Many years later, in 2009, SEAT launched the Exeo, which is basically a rebadged Audi A4 on the B7 platform, with some minor modifications to the front and rear fascias. Although it was not an E-segment vehicle but a segment D. It remained successful as a company car until 2013. Also, it was used as a police cruiser for the Guardia Civil highway corps. It was available in sedan and station wagon variants. It was the first vehicle from the brand equipped with diesel direct common raíl injection.

=== Sweden ===
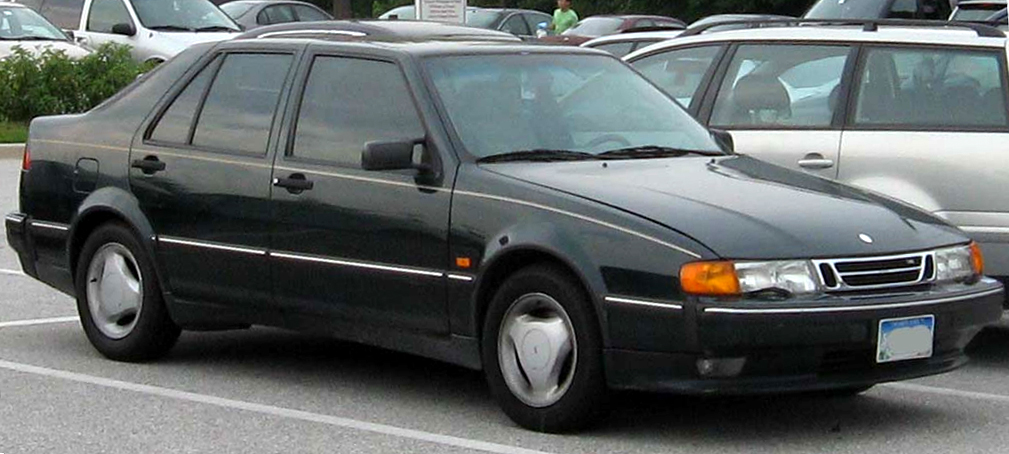
1991-1994 Saab 9000

Saab's first executive car was the 1984 Saab 9000, which was produced in sedan and liftback body styles. The 9000 was replaced by the Saab 9-5. In 2010 the second generation of the 9-5 switched to a platform shared with various General Motors models until Saab went bankrupt in 2012.

Volvo began producing executive cars in 1968 with the Volvo 164. In 1974, the 164 was replaced by the Volvo 260, which was replaced by the Volvo 760 in 1982 and then the Volvo 960 in 1994. The 960 was renamed the S90 (sedan models) and V90 (wagon models) in 1996. The Volvo S80 was released in 1998, and was replaced in 2016 by a new generation of Volvo S90/V90 sedans and wagons that presently remain in production.

=== United Kingdom ===
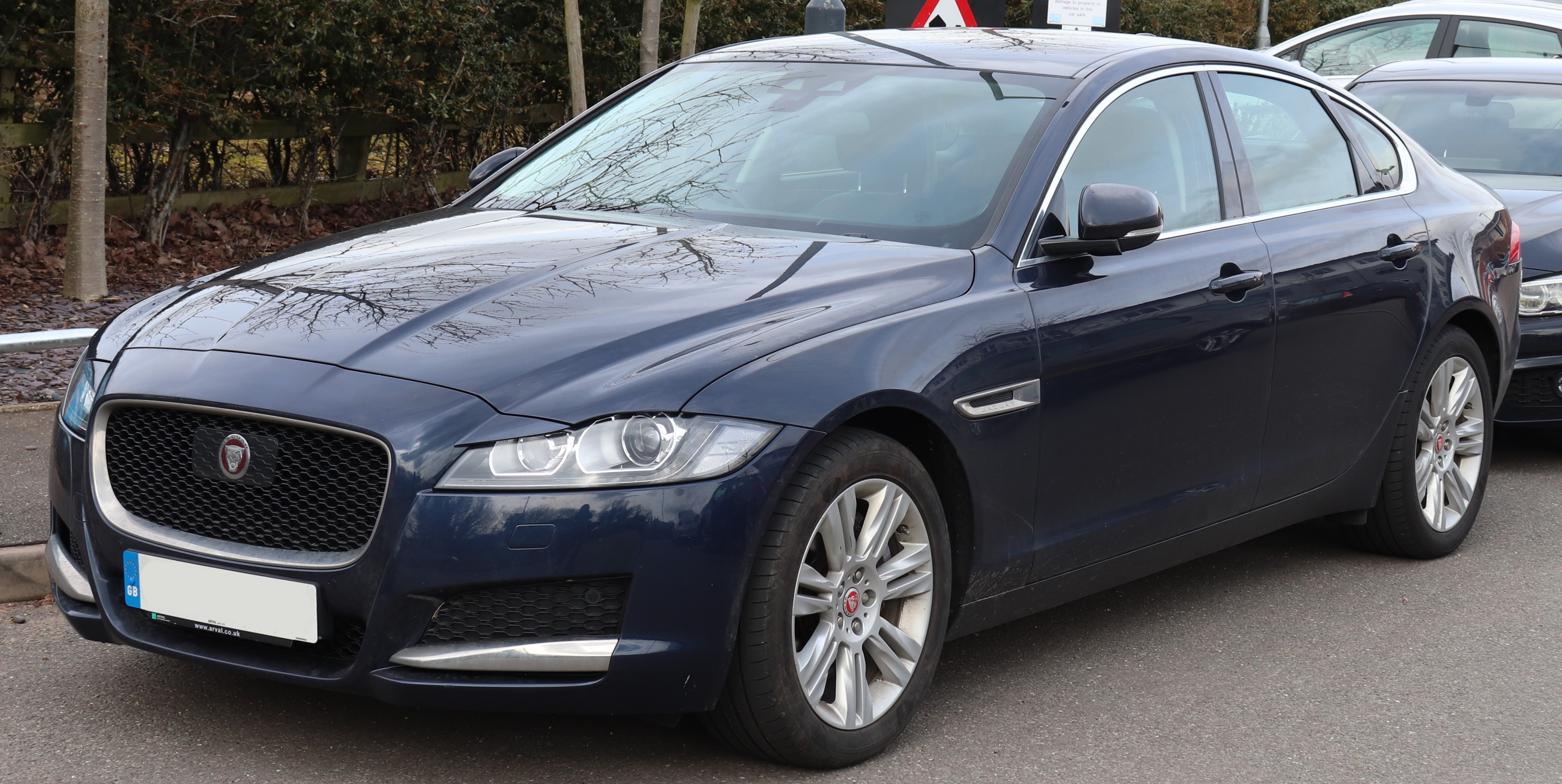
2017 Jaguar XF (X260)

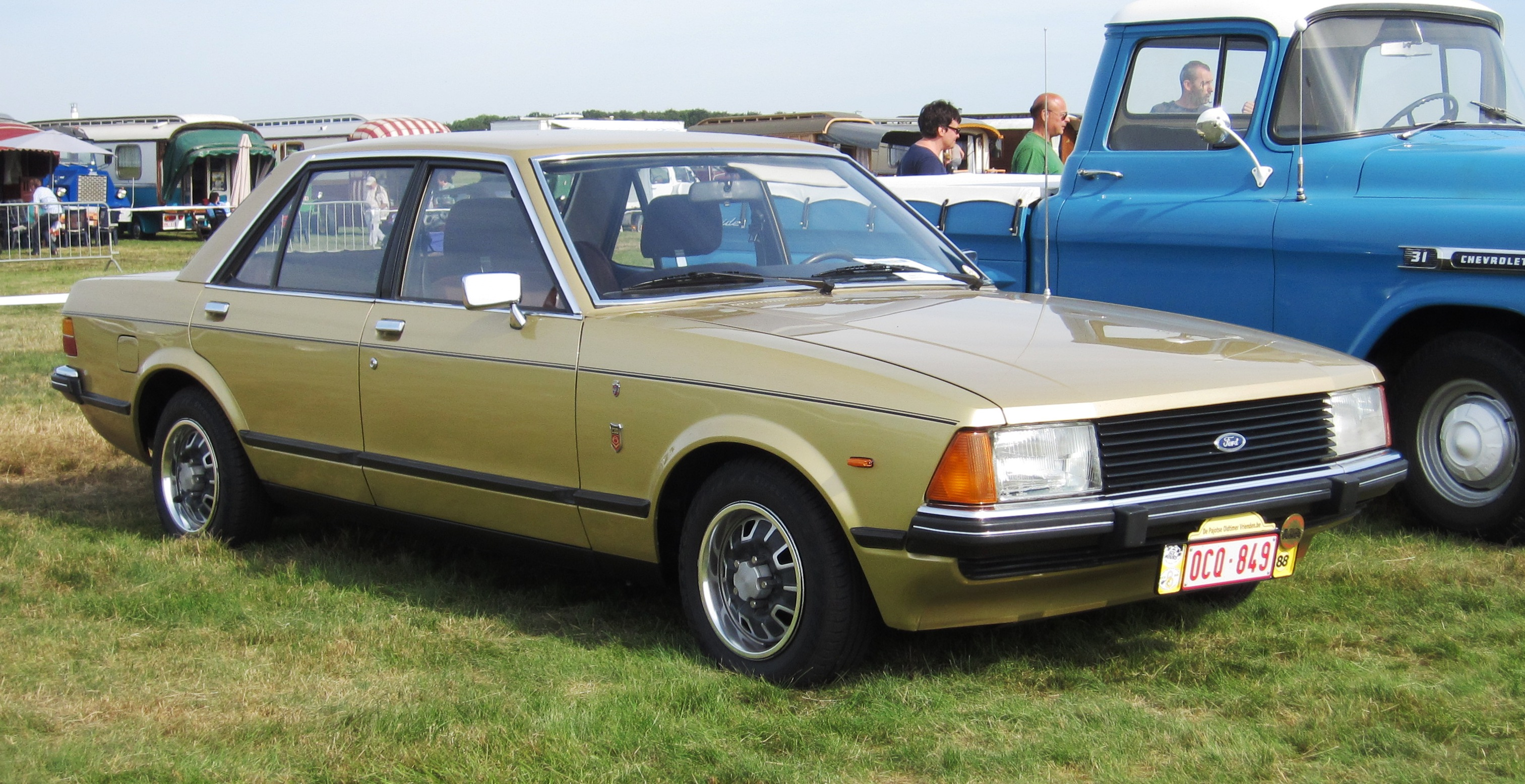
1977–1985 Ford Granada

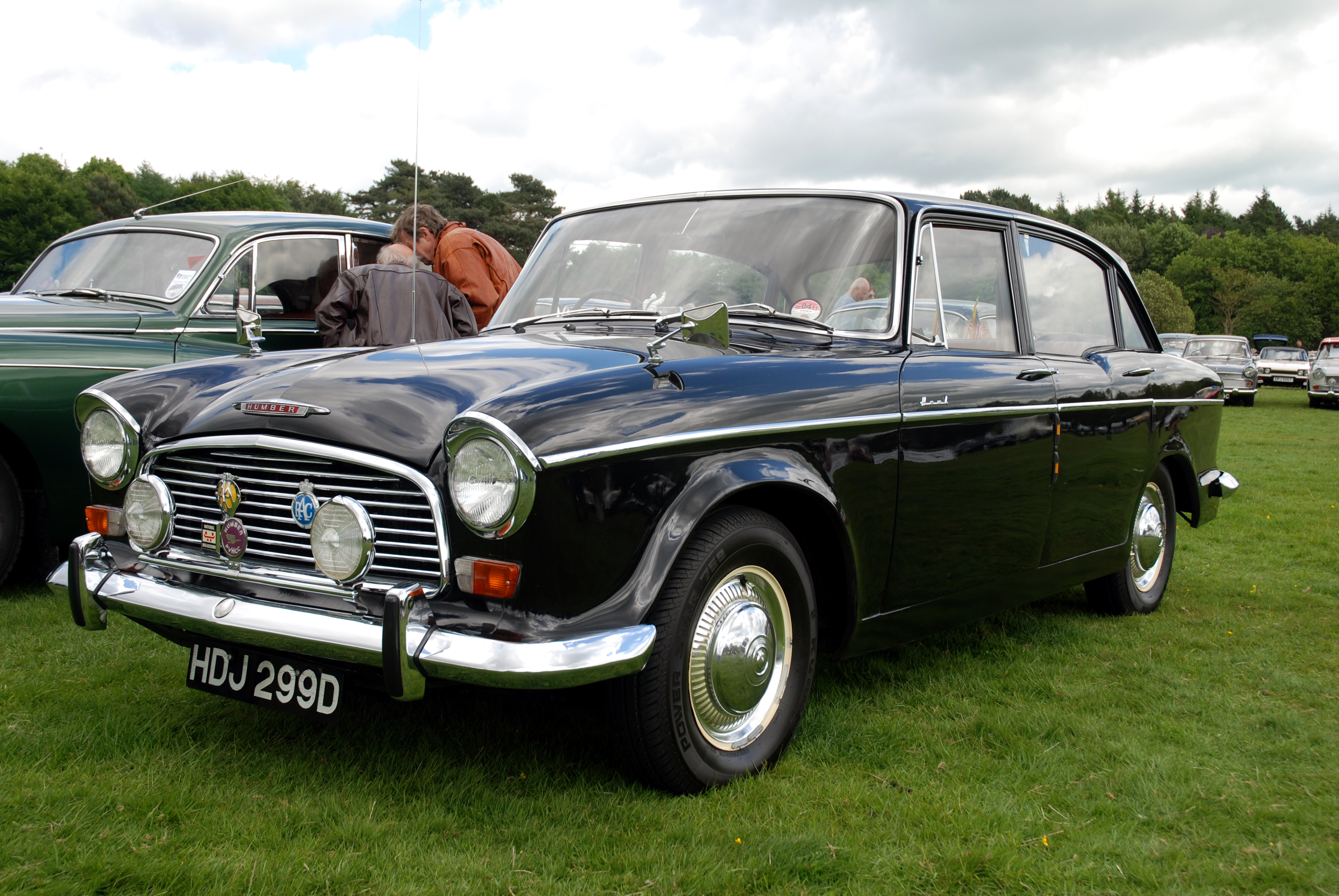
1966 Humber Hawk (Series IVA)

Daimler Company produced luxury cars in various sizes starting in the late 1890s. The lineage that led to their executive cars began with the 1923–1929 Daimler 16 and Daimler 16/55 models, which were followed in 1932 by the Daimler Fifteen. The Fifteen was replaced by the 1937 Daimler New Fifteen and then the 1939 Daimler Consort (originally called the "Daimler 2½ Litre"). The Consort was replaced by the 1953–1958 Daimler Conquest. In 1962, the Daimler 2.5 V8 (later renamed the "Daimler V8-250") was released, based on the Jaguar Mark 2. In 1966, the Daimler Sovereign was introduced, based on the Jaguar 420. The Sovereign and V8-250 were produced alongside each other until they both ended production in 1969.

Jaguar began production of executive cars in 1935 with the first of the Jaguar Mark IV models. These were replaced by the 1948–1951 Jaguar Mark V. The Mark V's successor increased in size to the full-size luxury car segment, so the next executive car was the 1955 Jaguar Mark 1. In 1959, the Mark 1 was replaced by the Jaguar Mark 2. In 1963, the Jaguar S-Type was introduced and sold alongside the Mark 2. Both models were replaced by the 1966–1968. The Jaguar XJ series began in 1968 and received updates (with a redesign in 2010) until 2019. Following a 30-year hiatus from the executive car market, Jaguar returned in 1998 with the retro-styled S-Type. The S-Type was replaced by the 2007 Jaguar XF (X250) and then the 2015 Jaguar XF (X260), which ceased production in 2024.

Humber's first executive car was the 1945 Humber Hawk. The Hawk was available with features such as two-tone and metallic paintwork, leather upholstery, wood trim, and a sunroof. Production of the Hawk, along with the similarly sized Humber Super Snipe and Imperial, ceased when the brand was dissolved in 1967.

Rover entered the executive car market in 1948 with the Rover P3. The P3 was replaced by the Rover P4 in 1949, which was produced until 1964. The 1963 Rover P6 was the next executive car produced by Rover, which was replaced by the Rover SD1 in 1976 (marketed as the Standard 2000 in India). The SD1 was replaced by the 1986 Rover 800 series, which was a jointly developed with the Honda Legend and had a front-wheel drive layout. In 1999, the 800 series was replaced by the Rover 75, which was produced until 2005. The 75 straddled the executive and compact executive categories due to its size, although a long wheelbase version was available.

The first executive car to be badged a Triumph was the 1946–1954 Triumph 1800/2000/Renown versions. Triumph's next and final entry to the executive car market was the 1963–1977 Triumph 2000, which was a sales success in Britain.

Ford Europe's first executive car was the 1950 Ford Zephyr. The Zephyr— and related Consul, Zodiac, and Executive models— were produced over four generations until 1972. The 1972 Ford Granada was initially built in the United Kingdom before switching to being imported from Germany in 1976. In 1985, the Ford Scorpio was released, being sold in the U.K. as a Ford Granada until 1994.

Vauxhall entered the executive car market with the 1978 Vauxhall Carlton and related Vauxhall Royale/Senator, which were based on the Opel Rekord E. In 1986, the Vauxhall Carlton Mark II switched to the German-built Opel Omega A, which was replaced in 1994 by the Vauxhall Omega (a rebadged version of the Opel Omega B).

=== United States ===
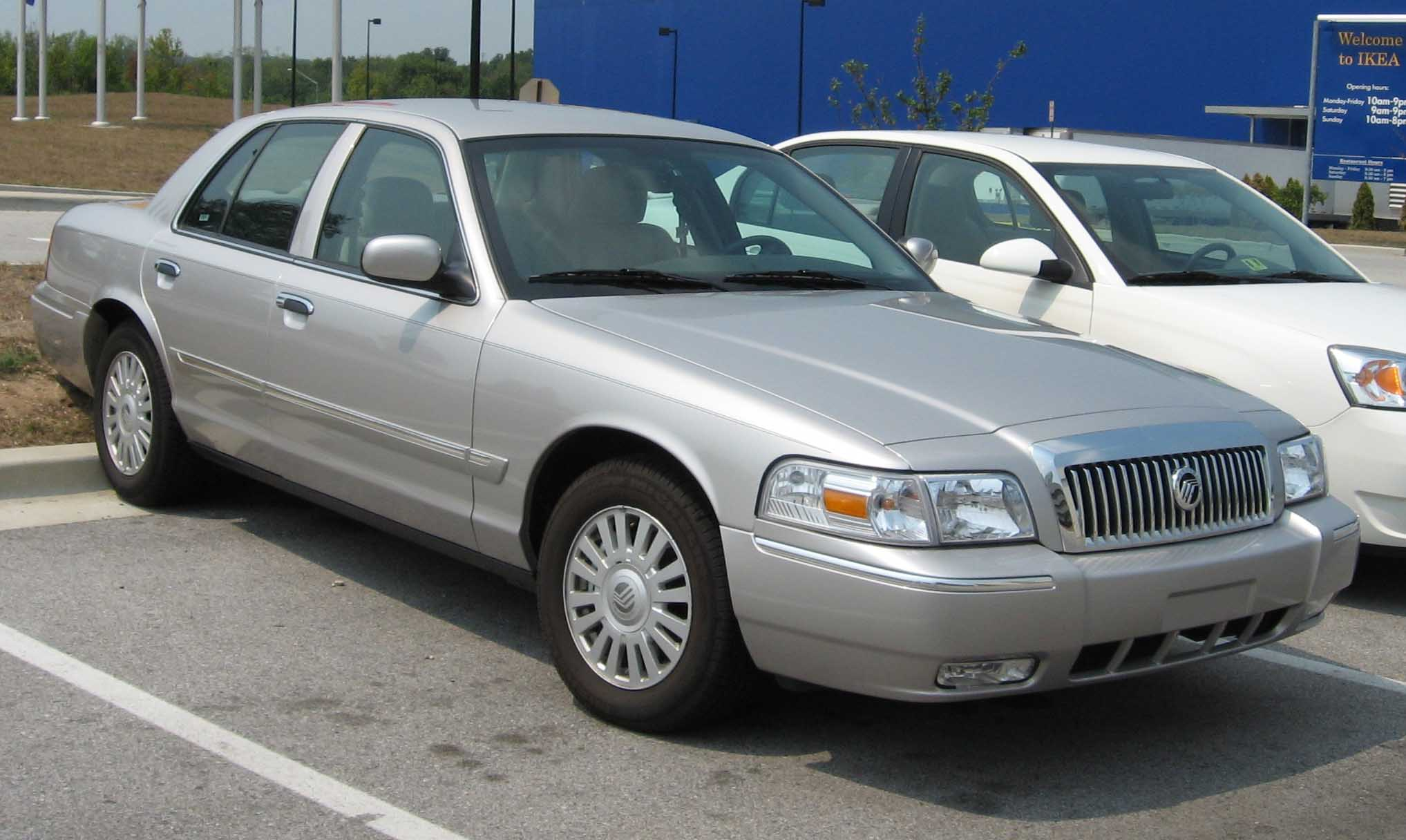
A 2007 Mercury Grand Marquis, an example of an American executive car; in the United States, this car type is called a full-size car.

In the United States, executive cars are referred to as full-sized cars.

=== Vietnam ===
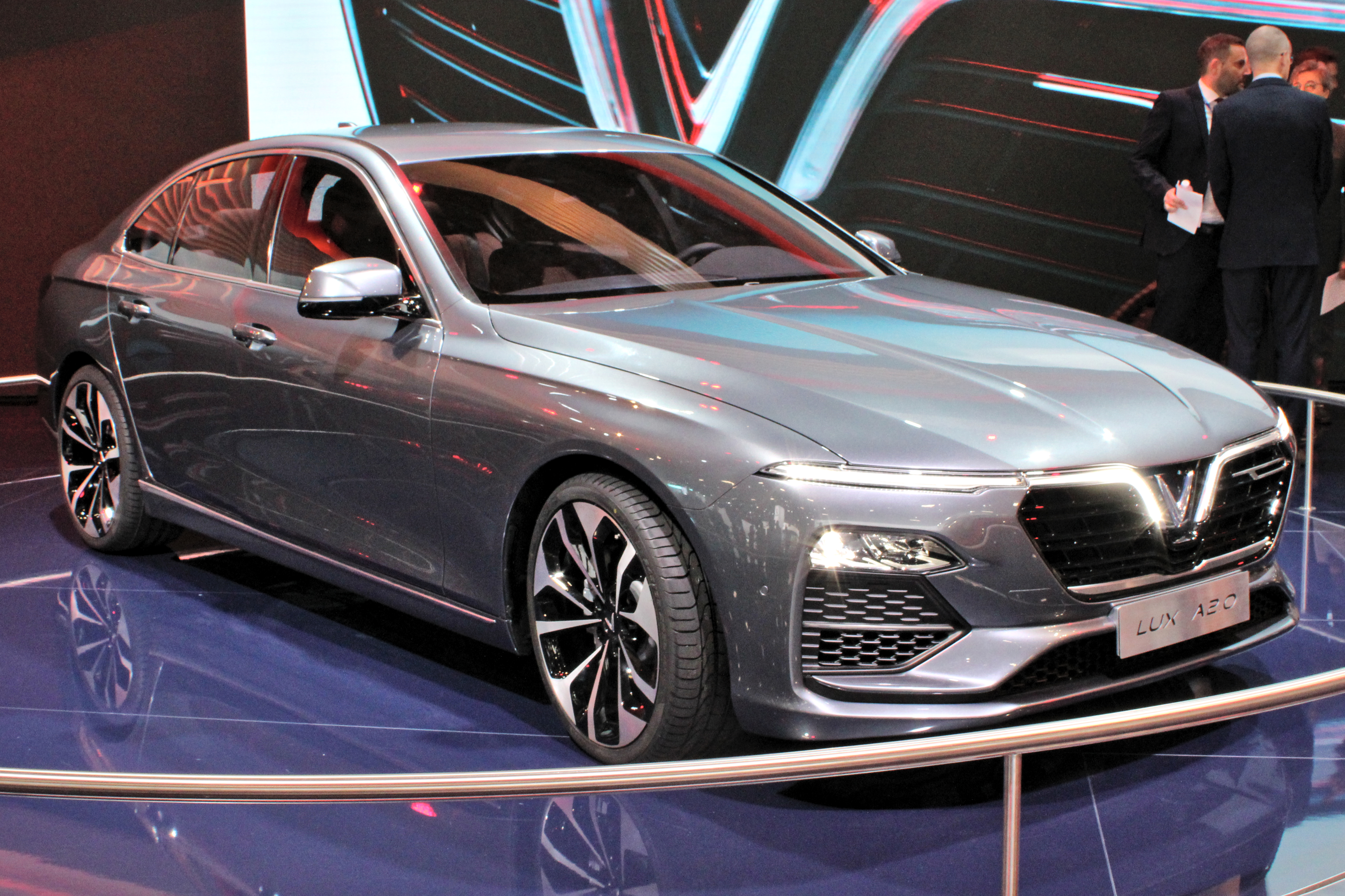
First debut of LUX A2.0 at Paris Motor Show 2018

The first executive car produced by a Vietnamese company is the VinFast LUX A2.0, which debuted at the 2018 Paris Motor Show. Production started in 2019 and it achieved success in the Vietnamese domestic car market.

== See also ==
- Car classification
- Full-size car
- Luxury car
- Sports sedan
