= 75th Piket =

Rural locality in Novokuznetsky District, Russia

75th Piket 75-й Пикет
- Settlement
- Location within Kemerovo Oblast Location within Russia
- Coordinates: 53.738889°N 86.936111°E
- Country: Russia
- Region: Kemerovo Oblast
- District: Novokuznetsky District
- Time zone: UTC+7:00

75th Piket (Russian: 75-й Пикет) is a rural locality (a passing loop) in Zagorskoye Rural Settlement of Novokuznetsky District, Russia. The population was 6 as of 2010.

== Streets ==
- Dachnaya
- Nizhnyaya

== Geography ==
75th Piket is located 16 km west of Novokuznetsk (the district's administrative centre) by road. Rassvet is the nearest rural locality.
