= 360 km =

360 km 360 км
- Settlement
- Location within Kemerovo Oblast Location within Russia
- Coordinates: 53.775°N 86.991667°E
- Country: Russia
- Region: Kemerovo Oblast
- District: Novokuznetsky District
- Time zone: UTC+7:00

360 km (Russian: 360 км) is a rural locality (a settlement) in Zagorskoye Rural Settlement of Novokuznetsky District, Russia. The population was 58 as of 2010.

== Geography ==
360 km is located 15 km northwest of Novokuznetsk (the district's administrative centre) by road. Kalachevo is the nearest rural locality.

== Streets ==
There is no streets with titles.
