= 10th razezd =

Rural locality in Mariinsky District, Kemerovo Oblast, Russia

10th razezd 10-й разъезд
- Settlement
- Location within Kemerovo Oblast Location within Russia
- Coordinates: 56.146389°N 87.844444°E
- Country: Russia
- Region: Kemerovo Oblast
- District: Mariinsky District
- Time zone: UTC+07:00

10th razezd (Russian: 10-й разъезд) is a rural locality (a settlement) in Pervomayskoye Rural Settlement of Mariinsky District, Russia. The population was 10 as of 2010.

== Geography ==
10th razezd is located 20 km north of Mariinsk (the district's administrative centre) by road.

== Population ==
According to the 2010 All-Russian Population Census, 10 people (3 men, 7 women) live in the 10th razyezd settlement.
