= 517 km =

517 km 517 км
- Passing loop
- Location within Kemerovo Oblast Location within Russia
- Coordinates: 52.975°N 87.446111°E
- Country: Russia
- Region: Kemerovo Oblast
- District: Tashtagolsky District
- Time zone: UTC+7:00

517 km (Russian: 517 км) is a rural locality (a passing loop) in Kalarskoye Rural Settlement of Tashtagolsky District, Russia. The population was 3 as of 2010.

== Streets ==
There is no streets with titles.

== Geography ==
517 km is located 55 km northwest of Tashtagol (the district's administrative centre) by road. Petukhov Log is the nearest rural locality.
