= 534 km =

534 km 534 км
- Passing loop
- Location within Kemerovo Oblast Location within Russia
- Coordinates: 52.93°N 87.594167°E
- Country: Russia
- Region: Kemerovo Oblast
- District: Tashtagolsky District
- Time zone: UTC+7:00

534 km (Russian: 534 км) is a rural locality (a passing loop) in Kalarskoye Rural Settlement of Tashtagolsky District, Russia. The population was 13 as of 2010.

== Streets ==
- Vesyolaya

== Geography ==
534 km is located 35 km northwest of Tashtagol (the district's administrative centre) by road. Kalary is the nearest rural locality.
