= Fiat 1500 (1935) =

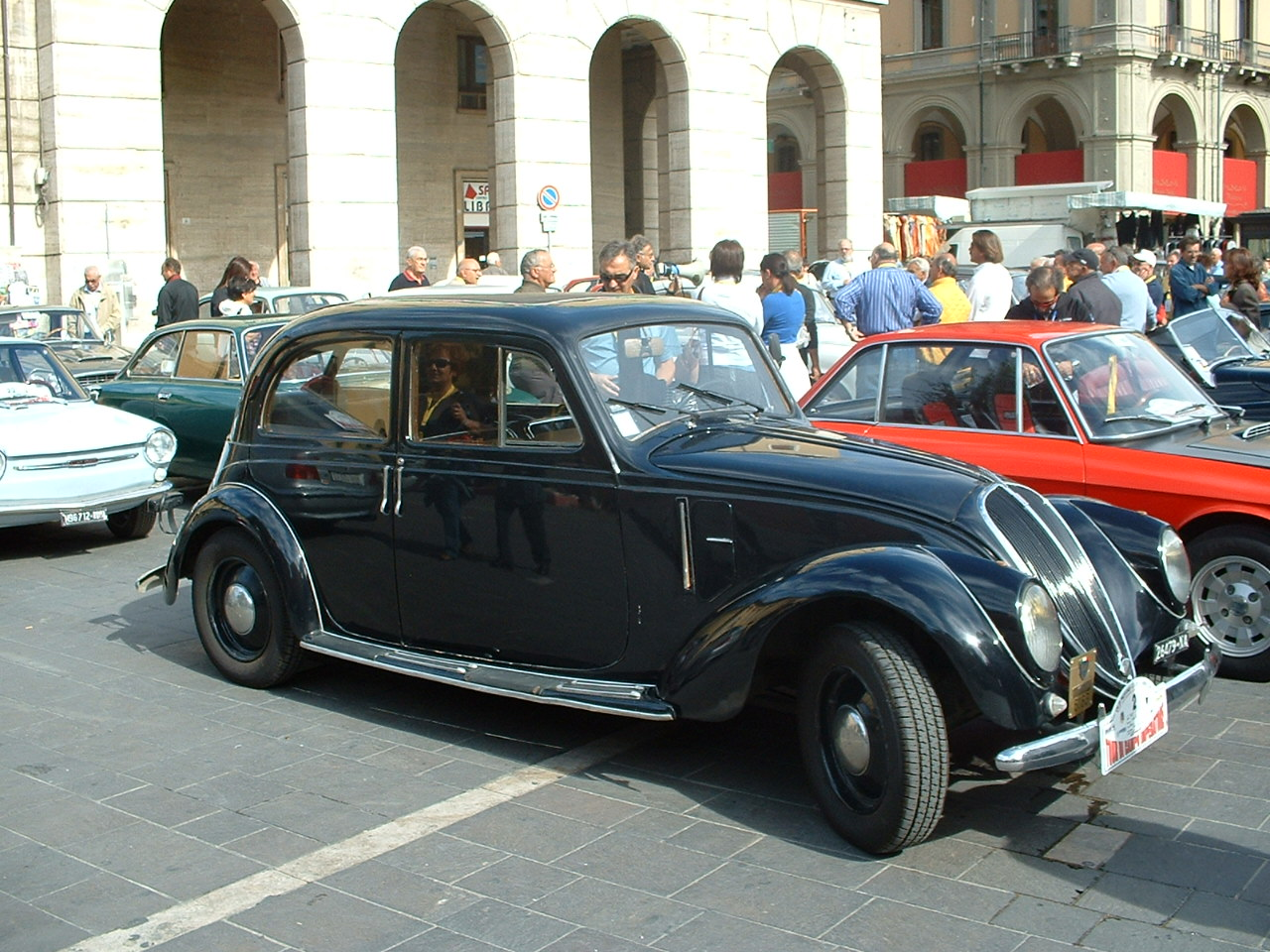
- Fiat 1500 B, 1938

Overview
- Manufacturer: Fiat
- Production: 1935–1950

Body and chassis
- Body style: 4-door saloon 2-door convertible
- Layout: Front-engine, rear-wheel-drive

Powertrain
- Engine: 1,493 cc I6
- Transmission: 4-speed manual

Dimensions
- Wheelbase: 2,800 mm (110.2 in)
- Length: 4,465 mm (175.8 in)

Chronology
- Predecessor: Fiat 515
- Successor: Fiat 1400

The Fiat 1500 was a six-cylinder car produced by the Fiat from 1935 to 1950. It was one of the first cars tested in a wind tunnel, following the Chrysler Airflow produced one year earlier. The streamlined styling achieved an aerodynamic efficiency unequalled before it in a touring car and (contrary to the failure of the "lumpen" Airflow) disproved the thesis aerodynamic cars would not sell.

== History ==
The Fiat 1500 was introduced at the November 1935 Salone dell'automobile di Milano (Milan Motor Show). It was powered by a 1,493 cc (91.1 cu in) overhead valve straight-six engine, producing 45 PS (33 kW; 44 hp) at 4,400 rpm. The transmission had four speeds, and synchromesh on the top two gears. Top speed was 115 km/h (71 mph). For the first time on a Fiat there were independent suspensions at the front, of the Dubonnet type. The frame was X-shaped, with a boxed centre section.

Fiat offered two factory body styles, a four-door pillarless saloon with suicide doors at the rear, and a two-door convertible with suicide doors as well; both lacked a boot lid, as the luggage compartment was only accessible folding the rear seat, and carried an external spare wheel in a recess at the rear of the body. As an alternative the 1500 was also available as bare chassis, and numerous cars received coachbuilt bodies.

=== 1939: the 1500 B ===
An improved, second series model was introduced in 1939, distinguished as was Fiat's custom at the time by a letter added to the model name: the Fiat 1500 B. It had more powerful brakes and an handbrake acting on the transmission through a band brake instead than on the rear axle drum brakes as before. The 1500 B was otherwise virtually undistinguishable from the original model.

=== 1940: the 1500 C ===
The 1500 B was short lived as in 1940 Fiat replaced it with the 1500 C, sporting a redesigned and more conventional looking front end. Following the look introduced with the Fiat 2800 flagship of 1938, the grille was pointed, taller and more upright than before—the so-called musone, big snout. The headlamps ceased to be integrated in the front wings. Beginning with this model the sole factory body option was the four-door saloon.

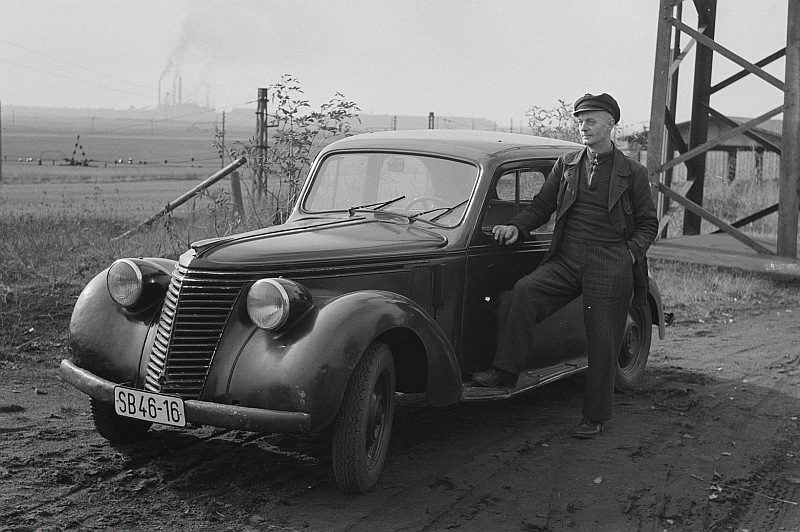
A 1500 C or D, showing the redesigned front end used from 1940 onwards.

=== 1946: the 1500 D ===
In 1946, after World War II, Fiat resumed production of pre-war models, the 500, 1100 and the 1500 C. Since the ongoing development of all-new cars would take some years, improvements were made to keep these vehicles of 1930s vintage competitive on the market. The resulting 1500 D was introduced at the 1948 Turin Motor Show, alongside the updated 1100 B and the 500 B Giardiniera (station wagon). Externally the 1500 D was largely unchanged from the 1940 1500 C, while there were significant mechanical differences. The front Dubonnet suspension had been replaced by a double wishbone design similar to the 1100s; therefore the steering had to be changed as well. The engine had been equipped with a twin-choke Weber 30 DCR carburettor, had a higher 6.2:1 compression ratio and other changes, pushing output to 47 PS (35 kW; 46 hp); top speed rose to 120 km/h (75 mph). Between 1948 and 1949, production of this model amounted to over 2,800.

=== 1949: the 1500 E ===
The fifth and final version of the 1500, the 1500 E, was first shown at the 1949 Fiera del Levante in Bari, together with the similarly updated 1100 E. The main distinguishing feature of these "E" models was their luggage compartment, accessible from outside the car; the previously rear-mounted spare wheel had to be carried inside the car, bolted inside the newly acquired boot lid. In the case of the 1500, the body aft of the rear doors was redesigned: the sloping back, almost unchanged since 1935, gave way to three-box styling. Together with more robust bumpers, this increased the overall length of the car by some 3 cm (1.2 in). The rear window was one-piece instead of being split, and the running boards were integrated in the body-side stampings. Other notable revisions were made to the transmission: the clutch was strengthened, synchromesh was added to second gear, and inside the cabin there was a column-mounted shifter. In total about 1,700 1500 Es were made, for a grand total of about 46,000 1500s of all models.

After 15 years of production, in 1950 the 1500 was replaced by the groundbreaking unibody Fiat 1400, the marque's first all-new post-war car.
