= Flight 527 =

Flight 527 may refer to:

- Lake Central Flight 527, crashed on 5 March 1967
- Lufthansa Flight 527, crashed on 26 July 1979
