= 545 km =

545 km 545 км
- Passing loop
- Location within Kemerovo Oblast Location within Russia
- Coordinates: 52°55′N 87°44′E
- Country: Russia
- Region: Kemerovo Oblast
- District: Tashtagolsky District
- Time zone: UTC+7:00

545 km (Russian: 545 км) is a rural locality (a passing loop) in Kalarskoye Rural Settlement of Tashtagolsky District, Russia. The population was 61 as of 2010.

== Streets ==
- Bolotnaya
- Krupskoy
- Lugovaya
- Shosseinaya

== Geography ==
545 km is located 22 km north of Tashtagol (the district's administrative centre) by road. Chugunash is the nearest rural locality.
