= Fiat 2800 =

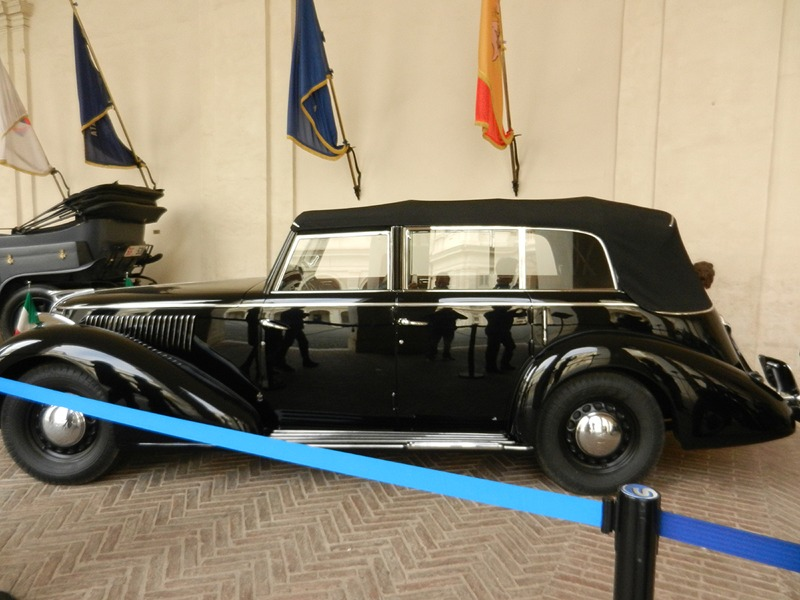
- A torpedo-bodied Fiat 2800

Overview
- Manufacturer: Fiat
- Production: 1938–1944

Body and chassis
- Body style: 4-door saloon 4-door military torpedo (2800 CMC)
- Layout: Front-engine, rear-wheel-drive

Powertrain
- Engine: 2.9 L 2,852 cc I6
- Transmission: 4-speed manual

Dimensions
- Wheelbase: 3,200 mm (126.0 in); 2800 CMC: 3,000 mm (118.1 in)
- Length: 5,300 mm (208.7 in); 2800 CMC: 4,795 mm (188.8 in)
- Width: 1,800 mm (70.9 in)
- Height: 1,700 mm (66.9 in)
- Kerb weight: 1,855 kg (4,090 lb); 2800 CMC: 1,970 kg (4,343 lb)

Chronology
- Predecessor: Fiat 527
- Successor: Fiat 2100

The Fiat 2800 is model of car produced by Italian car manufacturer Fiat between 1938 and 1944.

While taking up the stylistic innovations of the 1500 C, the 2800 was the last substantially new model to come out of the Fiat factories before the outbreak of the Second World War. It is said that its design was proposed to the top management of Fiat by Benito Mussolini, who wanted a flagship to contrast with the Mercedes-Benz of the time.

Six cars were built in a six- to seven-seater torpedo version by the Farina factories; they became part of the garage of the Royal House at the Quirinal Palace, becoming the representative cars in use by the royal family and, in the post-war period, by the first presidents of the Republic. The same body shop also built a seventh example, a special military torpedo, for the personal use of King Vittorio Emanuele III as commander-in-chief of the Armed Forces.

During official ceremonies and in the reception of heads of state and popes, Vittorio Emanuele III used a Fiat 2800 imperial black car which he named "Alcinoo", as one of his most beautiful thoroughbreds. A book has been dedicated to this car, "The King's Last Car" by Marco Linari, which tells the story of this Fiat flagship, used from 1938 to 1962 in all the great parades both in times of monarchy and republic, and then forgotten in a garage in Rome. Fortunately, Raffaele Bacelliere, a motor dealer from Lake Varese, found it again eight years later. The volume also reports the memory of Emanuele Filiberto of Savoy and the introduction by Gabriele Albertini, former mayor of Milan. Among the most famous people who have paraded in the Fiat Torpedo 2800 are Benito Mussolini, Adolf Hitler, Francisco Franco, Umberto II, Harry Truman, Evita Perón and Charles de Gaulle, as well as the first four heads of state: Enrico De Nicola, Luigi Einaudi, Giovanni Gronchi and Antonio Segni. Today it is kept at the Onda Rossa Museum in Caronno Pertusella, in the province of Varese.

Two of these high-performance cars were used by King Vittorio Emanuele III and Pietro Badoglio during their escape from Rome to Pescara. In particular, the Torpedo Alcinoo was used to transport the luggage of the sovereigns.

Between 1938 and 1944 only 624 Fiat 2800's (both types) were built.

== Engine ==
- Engine type: straight-six, overhead valves
- Engine capacity: 2,852 cc
- Engine power: 85 PS (63 kW; 84 hp) at 4,000 rpm
- Top speed: 130 km/h (81 mph)

== Fiat 2800 CMC ==
In 1939 the Fiat 2800 CMC was introduced, or Corta Militare Coloniale, used by the commands of the Royal Army during the Second World War. It differs from the civilian model due to the more spartan bodywork and larger tires. This model continued in production until 1943, with one last one being completed in 1944.
