= Promyshlennaya =

Promyshlennaya Промышленная
- Urban-type settlement
- Interactive map of Promyshlennaya
- Location of Promyshlennaya Promyshlennaya (Kemerovo Oblast)
- Coordinates: 54.9188°N 85.6379°E
- Country: Russia
- Federal subject: Kemerovo Oblast
- Administrative district: Promyshlennovsky District
- Founded: 19th century

Population (2010 Census)
  - Total: 18,045
  - Estimate (2025): 19,149 (+6.1%)
- Time zone: UTC+7 (MSK+4)
- Postal code: 652380
- OKTMO ID: 32625151051

Promyshlennaya (Russian: Промышленная) is an urban locality (an urban-type settlement) in Promyshlennovsky District of Kemerovo Oblast, Russia. Population: 18,045 (2010 census); 17,654 (2002 census); 17,486 (1989 Soviet census).
