= 189 km =

Rural locality in Leninsk-Kuznetsky District, Russia

189 km 189 км
- Passing loop
- Location within Kemerovo Oblast Location within Russia
- Coordinates: 54.745278°N 86.185278°E
- Country: Russia
- Region: Kemerovo Oblast
- District: Leninsk-Kuznetsky District
- Time zone: UTC+7:00

189 km (Russian: 189 км) is a rural locality (a passing loop) in Demyanovskoye Rural Settlement of Leninsk-Kuznetsky District, Russia. The population was 25 as of 2010.

== Geography ==
The passing loop is located on the Yurga-Tashtagol line, 11 km north of Leninsk-Kuznetsky (the district's administrative centre) by road. Krasnaya Polyna is the nearest rural locality.
