= Fiat 527 =

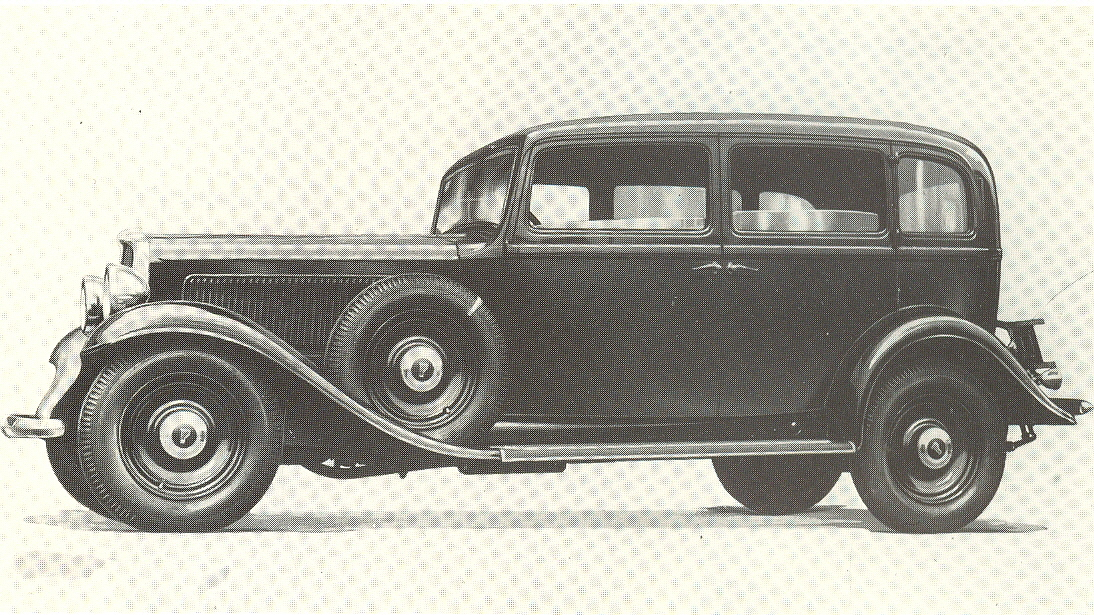
- Fiat 527 saloon

Overview
- Manufacturer: Fiat
- Also called: Fiat Ardita 2500
- Production: 1934–1936

Body and chassis
- Body style: 4-door saloon 4-door sports saloon
- Layout: Front-engine, rear-wheel-drive
- Related: Fiat 518 Ardita

Powertrain
- Transmission: 4-speed manual

Dimensions
- Wheelbase: 3,170 mm (124.8 in)
- Length: 4,600 mm (181.1 in)
- Width: 1,878 mm (73.9 in)
- Height: 1,488 mm (58.6 in)
- Kerb weight: 1,400 kg (3,086 lb)

Chronology
- Predecessor: Fiat 522
- Successor: Fiat 2800

The Fiat 527 (also known as Fiat Ardita 2500) is a six-cylinder passenger car produced by Fiat between 1934 and 1936. The 527 was a larger-engined and more luxurious version of the four-cylinder 518 Ardita. This car was built only with a full-length chassis, having a wheelbase of 3,170 mm (124.8 in).

Unlike the four-cylinder Ardita, the 527 was not assembled outside Italy. Approximately 1,000 were produced.

== Engines ==
Model	Years	Engine	Displacement	Power	Torque	Fuel system
2500 Standard	1934–1936	straight-6 sidevalve	2,516 cc (153.5 cu in; 2.516 L)	52 hp (39 kW) @ 2,750 rpm	114 N⋅m (84 lb⋅ft) @ 1,800 rpm	single carburetor
2500 Sport	1934–1936	straight-6 sidevalve	2,516 cc (153.5 cu in; 2.516 L)	60 hp (45 kW) @ 3,000 rpm	142 N⋅m (105 lb⋅ft) @ 2,000 rpm	single carburetor
2800	1934–1936	straight-6 sidevalve	2,852 cc (174.0 cu in; 2.852 L)	69 hp (51 kW) @ 3,500 rpm	168 N⋅m (124 lb⋅ft) @ 2,250 rpm	single carburetor

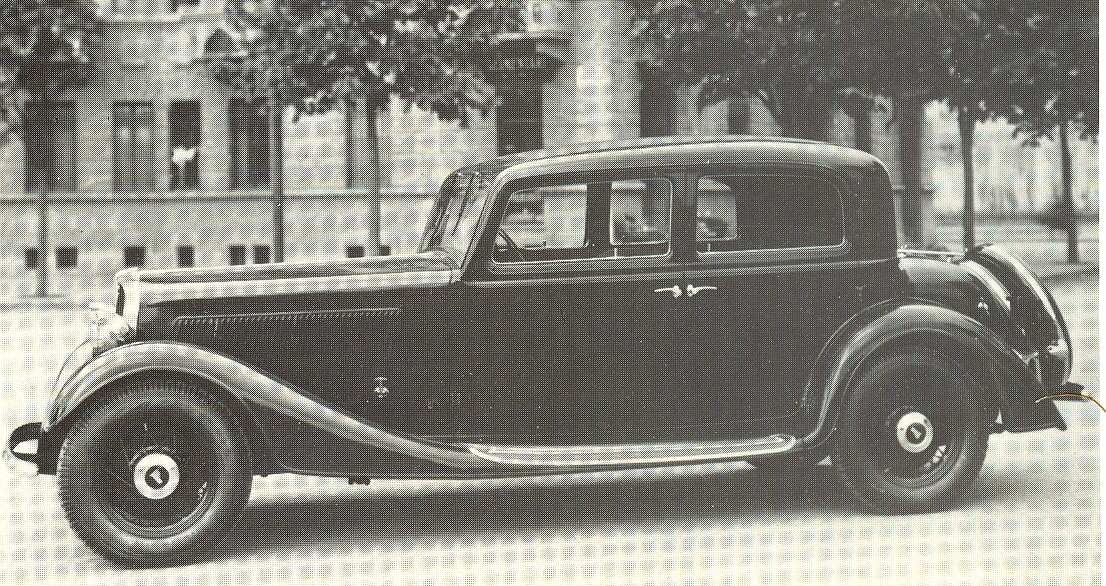
Fiat Ardita 2500 Sport (or 527 S)
