= 527 km =

527 km 527 км
- Passing loop
- Location within Kemerovo Oblast Location within Russia
- Coordinates: 52.918°N 87.495°E
- Country: Russia
- Region: Kemerovo Oblast
- District: Tashtagolsky District
- Time zone: UTC+7:00

527 km (Russian: 527 км) is a rural locality (a passing loop) in Kalarskoye Rural Settlement of Tashtagolsky District, Russia. The population was 27 as of 2010.

== Streets ==
- Khrustalevskaya

== Geography ==
527 km is located 44 km northwest of Tashtagol (the district's administrative centre) by road. Kalary is the nearest rural locality.
