= Promyshlennovsky District =

Promyshlennovsky District Промышленновский район (Russian)
- District
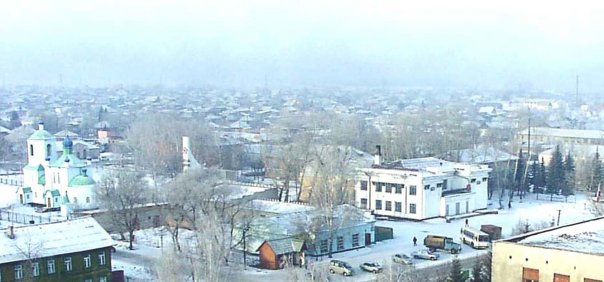
- Village panorama, Proma

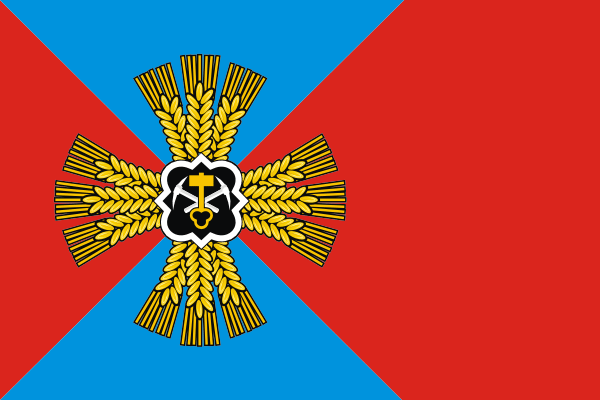
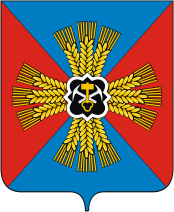
- Flag Coat of arms
- Location of Promyshlennovsky District in Kemerovo Oblast
- Coordinates: 54°54′39″N 85°38′35″E
- Country: Russia
- Federal subject: Kemerovo Oblast
- Established: 1935
- Administrative center: Promyshlennaya

Area
  - Total: 3,083 km^{2} (1,190 sq mi)

Population (2010 Census)
  - Total: 50,106
  - Density: 16.25/km^{2} (42.09/sq mi)
  - Urban: 36.0%
  - Rural: 64.0%

Administrative structure
  - Administrative divisions: 1 Urban-type settlements, 10 Rural territories
  - Inhabited localities: 1 urban-type settlements, 58 rural localities

Municipal structure
  - Municipally incorporated as: Promyshlennovsky Municipal District
  - Municipal divisions: 1 urban settlements, 10 rural settlements
- Time zone: UTC+7 (MSK+4)
- OKTMO ID: 32625000
- Website: http://adm-promishl-rn.ru/

Promyshlennovsky District (Russian: Промы́шленновский райо́н) is an administrative district (raion), one of the nineteen in Kemerovo Oblast, Russia. As a municipal division, it is incorporated as Promyshlennovsky Municipal District. It is located in the west of the oblast. The area of the district is 3,083 square kilometers (1,190 sq mi). Its administrative center is the urban locality (an urban-type settlement) of Promyshlennaya. Population: 50,106 (2010 census); 50,125 (2002 Census); 47,150 (1989 Soviet census). The population of Promyshlennaya accounts for 36.0% of the district's total population.
