= Novokuznetsky District =

Novokuznetsky District Новокузнецкий район (Russian)
- District
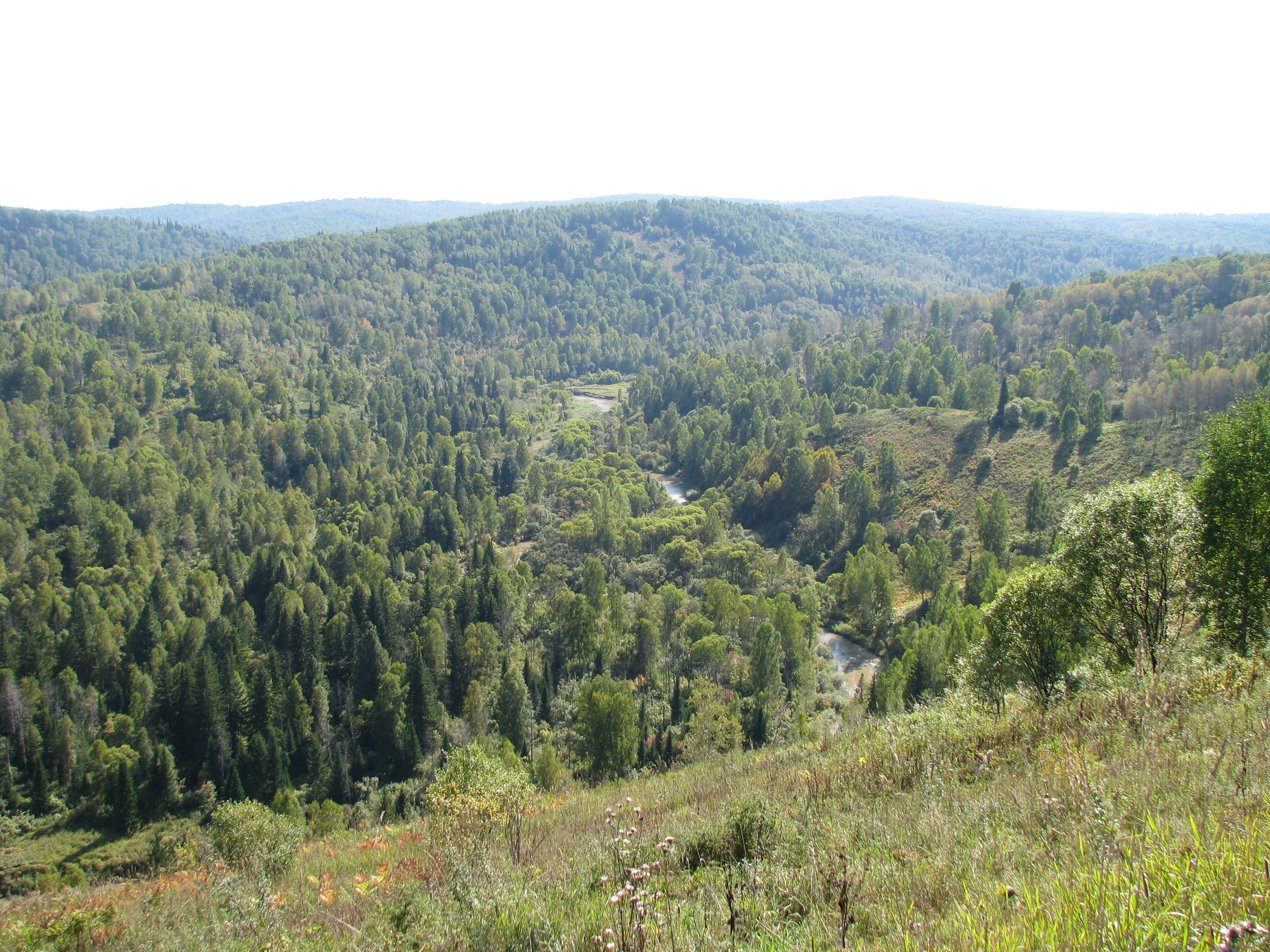
- The Bolshoy Tesh River valley in Novokuznetsky District

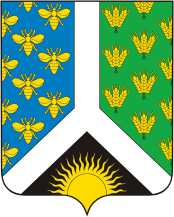
- Flag Coat of arms
- Location of Novokuznetsky District in Kemerovo Oblast
- Coordinates: 53°45′N 87°07′E
- Country: Russia
- Federal subject: Kemerovo Oblast
- Established: 4 September 1924
- Administrative center: Novokuznetsk

Area
  - Total: 13,039.5989 km^{2} (5,034.6173 sq mi)

Population (2010 Census)
  - Total: 50,681
  - Estimate (January 2014): 51,082
  - Density: 3.8867/km^{2} (10.067/sq mi)
  - Urban: 0%
  - Rural: 100%

Administrative structure
  - Administrative divisions: 6 rural territorie
  - Inhabited localities: 134 rural localities

Municipal structure
  - Municipally incorporated as: Novokuznetsky Municipal District
  - Municipal divisions: 0 urban settlements, 6 rural settlements
- Time zone: UTC+7 (MSK+4)
- OKTMO ID: 32619000
- Website: admnkr.ru

Population of Novokuznetsky District
- 2010 Census: 50,681
- 2002 Census: 50,812
- 1989 Census: 39,436
- 1979 Census: 44,532

Novokuznetsky District (Russian: Новокузне́цкий райо́н) is an administrative district (raion), one of the nineteen in Kemerovo Oblast, Russia. As a municipal division, it is incorporated as Novokuznetsky Municipal District. It is located in the center of the oblast and spans it from border to border in the southwest-northeast direction. The area of the district is 13,039.5989 square kilometers (5,034.6173 sq mi). Its administrative center is the city of Novokuznetsk (which is not administratively a part of the district). As of the 2010 Census, the total population of the district was 50,681.

== History ==
On March 19, 2007, a methane explosion ripped through the Ulyanovskaya mine in Novokuznetsky District killing over a hundred people. The mine was the largest coal producing center in Kemerovo Oblast. It is the deadliest mining accident in recent history.

== Administrative and municipal status ==
Within the framework of administrative divisions, Novokuznetsky District is one of the nineteen in the oblast. The city of Novokuznetsk serves as its administrative center, despite being incorporated separately as a city under oblast jurisdiction—an administrative unit with the status equal to that of the districts.

As a municipal division, the district is incorporated as Novokuznetsky Municipal District. Novokuznetsk City Under Oblast Jurisdiction is incorporated separately from the district as Novokuznetsky Urban Okrug.
