= Yurga =

Town in Kemerovo Oblast, Russia

Yurga Юрга
- Town
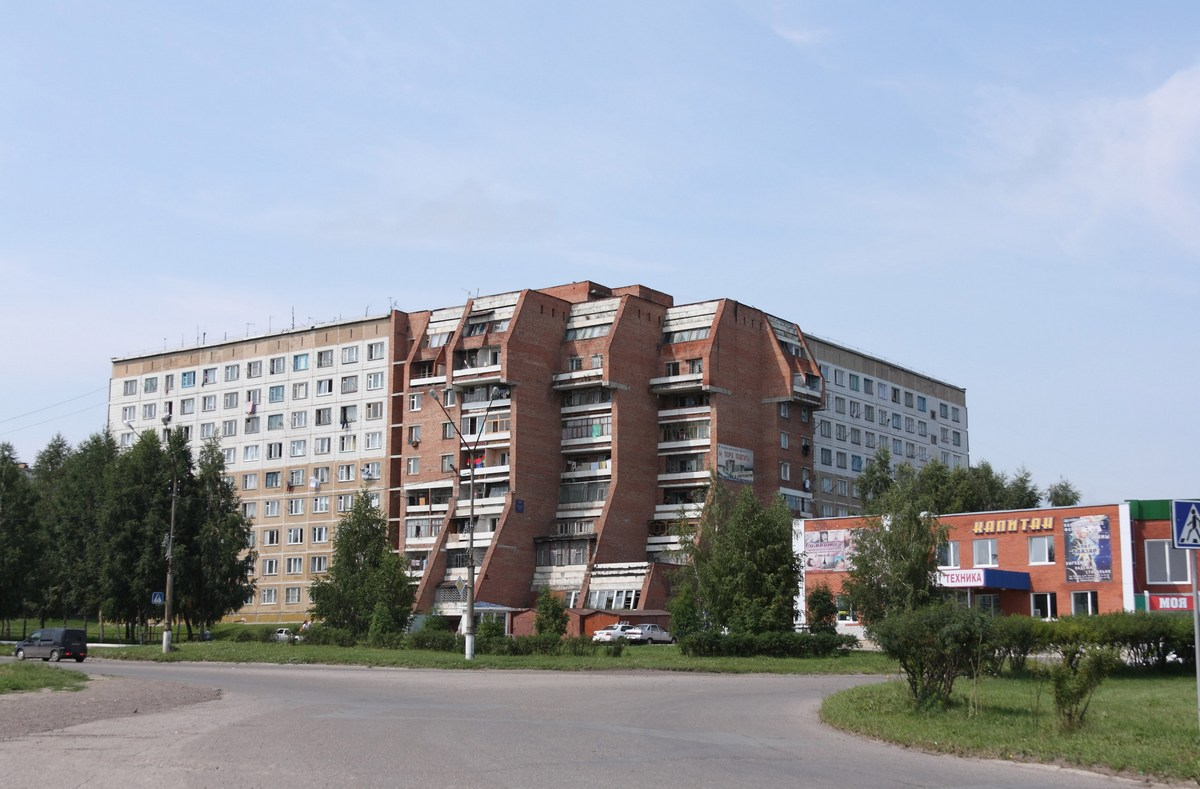
- Building in Yurga

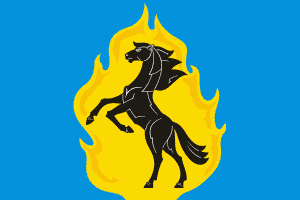
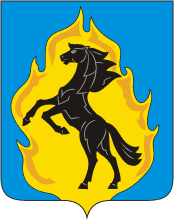
- Flag Coat of arms
- Interactive map of Yurga
- Location of Yurga Yurga (Kemerovo Oblast)
- Coordinates: 55°43′23″N 84°53′10″E
- Country: Russia
- Federal subject: Kemerovo Oblast
- Founded: 1886
- Town status since: 1949
- Elevation: 150 m (490 ft)

Population (2010 Census)
  - Total: 81,533
  - Estimate (2025): 77,092 (−5.4%)
  - Rank: 203rd in 2010

Administrative status
  - Subordinated to: Yurga Town Under Oblast Jurisdiction
  - Capital of: Yurginsky District, Yurga Town Under Oblast Jurisdiction

Municipal status
  - Urban okrug: Yurginsky Urban Okrug
  - Capital of: Yurginsky Urban Okrug, Yurginsky Municipal District
- Time zone: UTC+7 (MSK+4)
- Postal code: 652050
- OKTMO ID: 32749000001
- Website: yurga.org

Yurga (Russian: Юрга́) is a town in Kemerovo Oblast, Russia, located on the Tom River and the Trans-Siberian Railway. The population is 77 thousand people in 2025.

== History ==
It was founded in 1886. Work settlement status was granted to it in 1942; town status was granted in 1949.

Soviet Germans were deported to Yurga in 1941. A memorial was erected in their memory in the German graveyard in 2000.

== Administrative and municipal status ==
Within the framework of administrative divisions, Yurga serves as the administrative center of Yurginsky District, even though it is not a part of it. As an administrative division, it is incorporated separately as Yurga Town Under Oblast Jurisdiction—an administrative unit with the status equal to that of the districts. As a municipal division, Yurga Town Under Oblast Jurisdiction is incorporated as Yurginsky Urban Okrug.

== Military ==
The 74th Motor Rifle Brigade of the Russian Ground Forces is based here.
