= Yurginsky District, Kemerovo Oblast =

Coordinates: 55.7231°N 84.8861°E

Yurginsky District Юргинский район (Russian)
- District
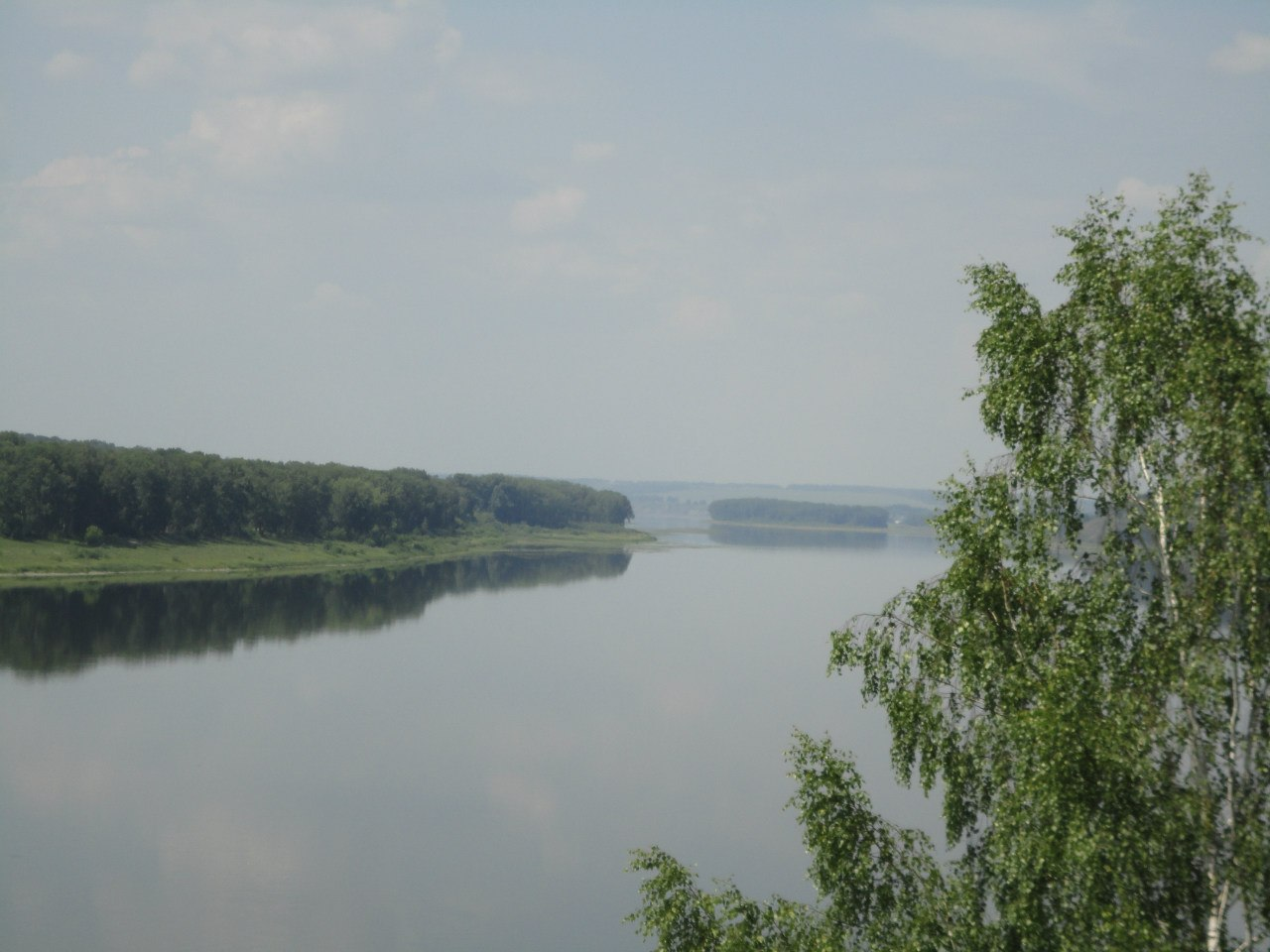
- Lower Tom River Nature Park

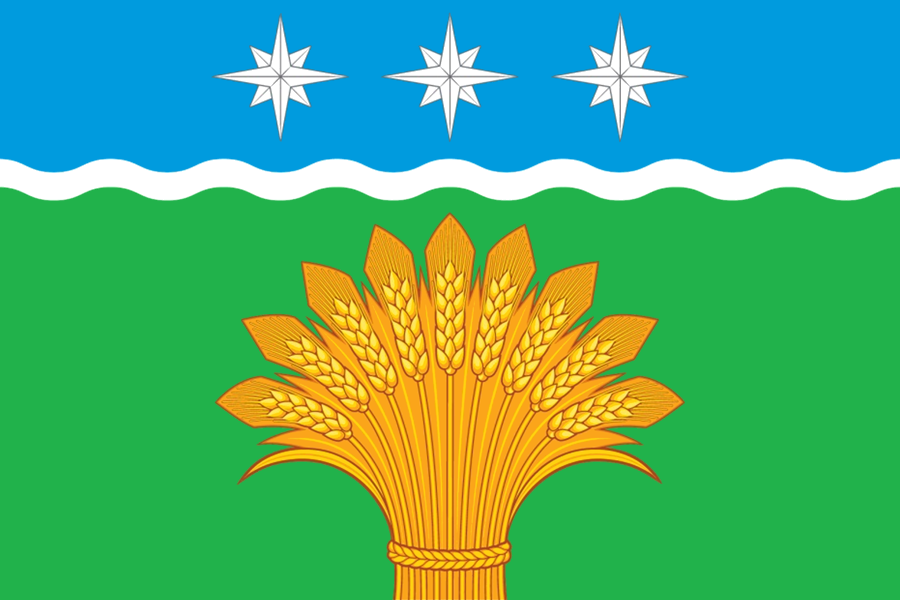
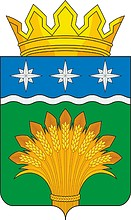
- Flag Coat of arms
- Location of Yurginsky District in Kemerovo Oblast
- Country: Russia
- Federal subject: Kemerovo Oblast
- Established: 1924
- Administrative center: Yurga

Area
  - Total: 2,510 km^{2} (970 sq mi)

Population (2010 Census)
  - Total: 22,448
  - Density: 8.94/km^{2} (23.2/sq mi)
  - Urban: 0%
  - Rural: 100%

Administrative structure
  - Administrative divisions: 9 rural territorie
  - Inhabited localities: 63 rural localities

Municipal structure
  - Municipally incorporated as: Yurginsky Municipal District
  - Municipal divisions: 0 urban settlements, 9 rural settlements
- Time zone: UTC+7 (MSK+4)
- OKTMO ID: 32640000
- Website: http://www.yurgregion.ru

Yurginsky District (Russian: Юрги́нский райо́н) is an administrative district (raion), one of the nineteen in Kemerovo Oblast, Russia. As a municipal division, it is incorporated as Yurginsky Municipal District. It is located in the northwest of the oblast. The area of the district is 2,510 square kilometers (970 sq mi). Its administrative center is the town of Yurga (which is not administratively a part of the district). Population: 22,448 (2010 census); 22,779 (2002 Census); 22,994 (1989 Soviet census).

== Administrative and municipal status ==
Within the framework of administrative divisions, Yurginsky District is one of the nineteen in the oblast. The town of Yurga serves as its administrative center, despite being incorporated separately as a town under oblast jurisdiction—an administrative unit with the status equal to that of the districts.

As a municipal division, the district is incorporated as Yurginsky Municipal District. Yurga Town Under Oblast Jurisdiction is incorporated separately from the district as Yurginsky Urban Okrug.
