= Topkinsky District =

Topkinsky District Топкинский район (Russian)
- District
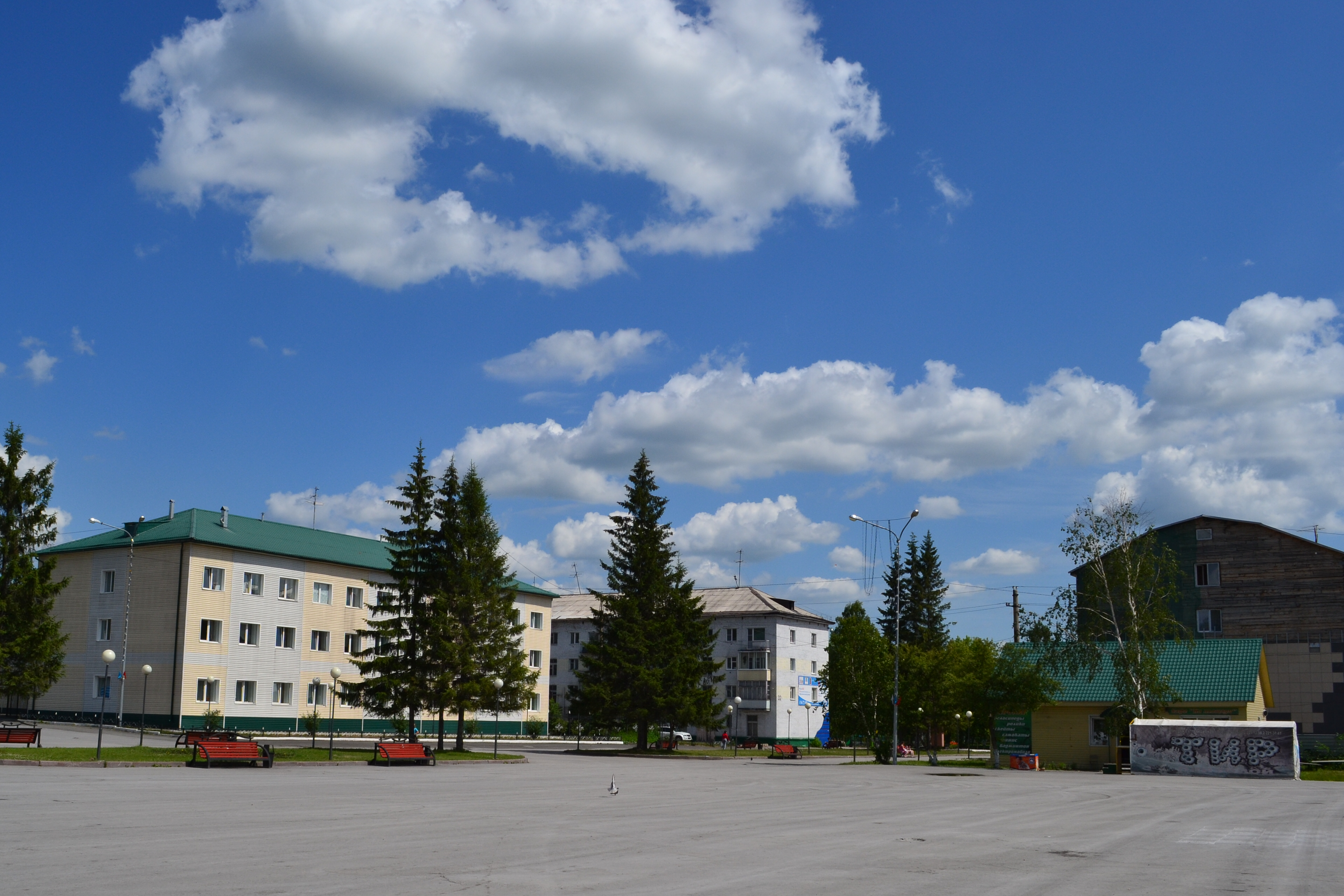
- Topki square

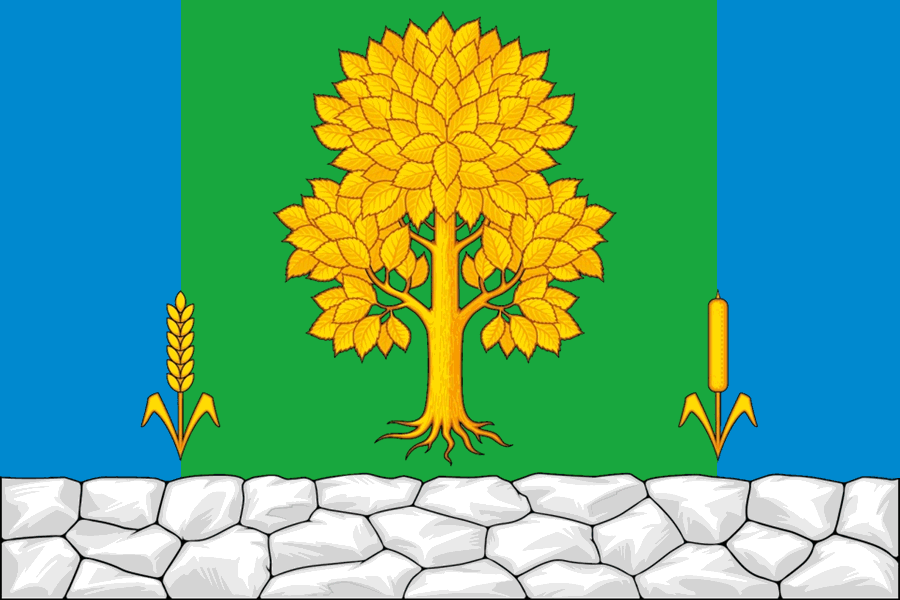
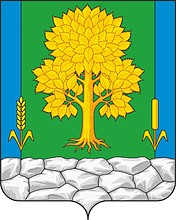
- Flag Coat of arms
- Location of Topkinsky District in Kemerovo Oblast
- Coordinates: 55°17′N 85°37′E
- Country: Russia
- Federal subject: Kemerovo Oblast
- Established: 1976
- Administrative center: Topki

Area
  - Total: 2,774 km^{2} (1,071 sq mi)

Population (2010 Census)
  - Total: 16,246
  - Density: 5.857/km^{2} (15.17/sq mi)
  - Urban: 0%
  - Rural: 100%

Administrative structure
  - Administrative divisions: 11 rural territorie
  - Inhabited localities: 57 rural localities

Municipal structure
  - Municipally incorporated as: Topkinsky Municipal District
  - Municipal divisions: 1 urban settlements, 11 rural settlements
- Time zone: UTC+7 (MSK+4)
- OKTMO ID: 32631000
- Website: http://admtop.ru/

Topkinsky District (Russian: Топки́нский райо́н) is an administrative district (raion), one of the nineteen in Kemerovo Oblast, Russia. As a municipal division, it is incorporated as Topkinsky Municipal District. It is located in the northwest of the oblast. The area of the district is 2,774 square kilometers (1,071 sq mi). Its administrative center is the town of Topki (which is not administratively a part of the district). Population: 16,246 (2010 census); 18,077 (2002 Census); 19,018 (1989 Soviet census).

== Administrative and municipal status ==
Within the framework of administrative divisions, Topkinsky District is one of the nineteen in the oblast. The town of Topki serves as its administrative center, despite being incorporated separately as a town under oblast jurisdiction—an administrative unit with the status equal to that of the districts.

As a municipal division, the district is incorporated as Topkinsky Municipal District, with Topki Town Under Oblast Jurisdiction being incorporated within it as Topkinskoye Urban Settlement.
