= Topki (town), Kemerovo Oblast =

Topki Топки
- Town
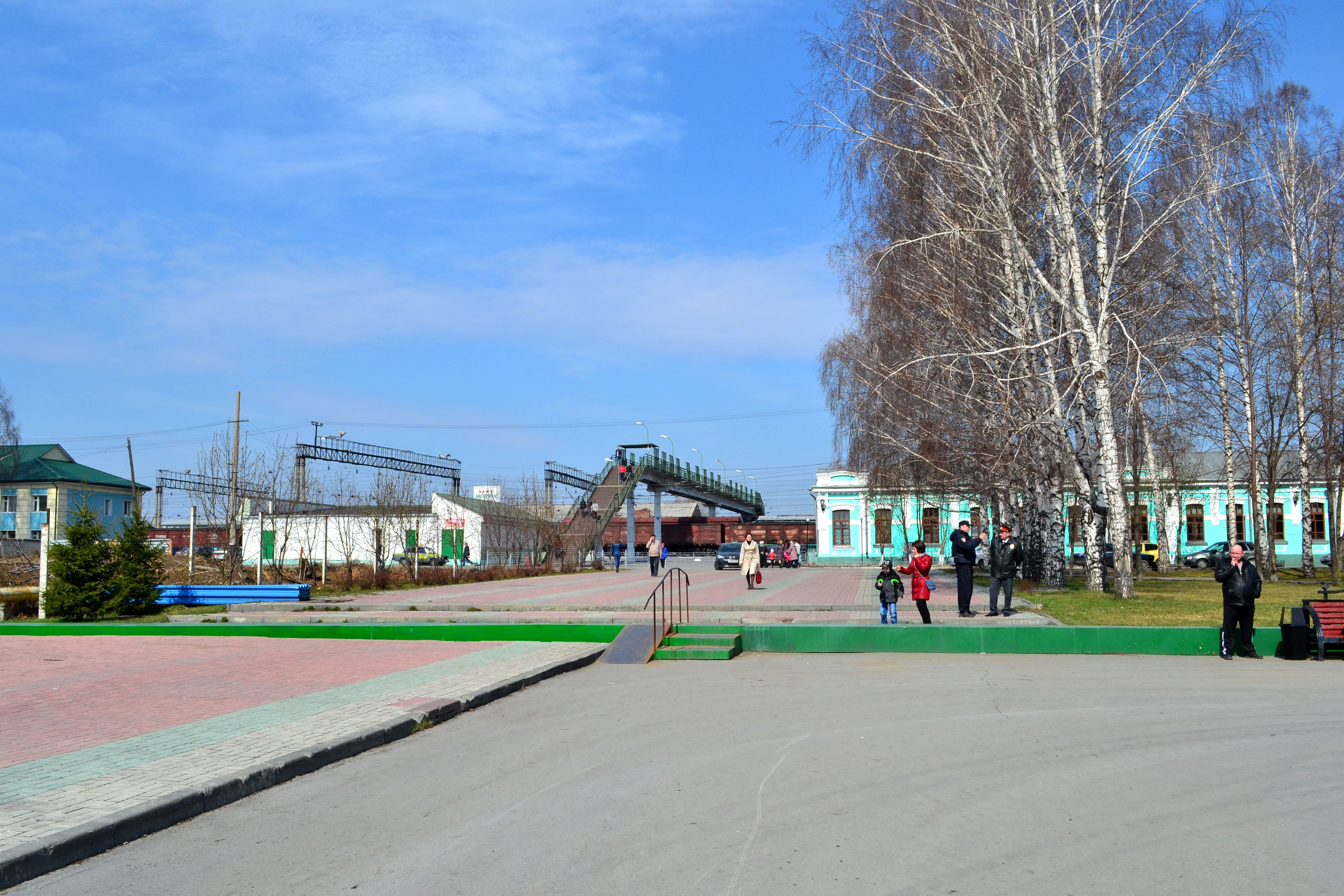
- Station Square, Topki

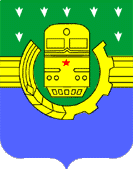
- Coat of arms
- Interactive map of Topki
- Location of Topki Topki (Kemerovo Oblast)
- Coordinates: 55°20′N 85°45′E
- Country: Russia
- Federal subject: Kemerovo Oblast
- Founded: 1914
- Town status since: 1933

Population (2010 Census)
  - Total: 28,641
  - Estimate (2025): 26,648 (−7%)

Administrative status
  - Subordinated to: Topki Town Under Oblast Jurisdiction
  - Capital of: Topkinsky District, Topki Town Under Oblast Jurisdiction

Municipal status
  - Municipal district: Topkinsky Municipal District
  - Urban settlement: Topkinskoye Urban Settlement
  - Capital of: Topkinsky Municipal District, Topkinskoye Urban Settlement
- Time zone: UTC+7 (MSK+4)
- Postal codes: 652300, 652303, 652305, 652359
- OKTMO ID: 32631101001
- Website: www.e-topki.ru

Topki (Russian: Топки́) is a town in Kemerovo Oblast, Russia, located 38 kilometers (24 mi) west of Kemerovo, the administrative center of the oblast. Population: 28,641 (2010 census); 31,004 (2002 census); 33,574 (1989 Soviet census).

== History ==
It was founded in 1914 due to the construction of the Trans-Siberian Railway. The Topki railway station was opened in 1916. It was granted town status in 1933.

== Administrative and municipal status ==
Within the framework of administrative divisions, Topki serves as the administrative center of Topkinsky District, even though is not a part of it. As an administrative division, it is incorporated separately as Topki Town Under Oblast Jurisdiction—an administrative unit with a status equal to that of the districts. As a municipal division, Topki Town Under Oblast Jurisdiction is incorporated within Topkinsky Municipal District as Topkinskoye Urban Settlement.
