= Novokuznetsk constituency =

Legislative constituency in Kemerovo Oblast, Russia

Novokuznetsk single-member constituency
- Constituency of the Russian State Duma

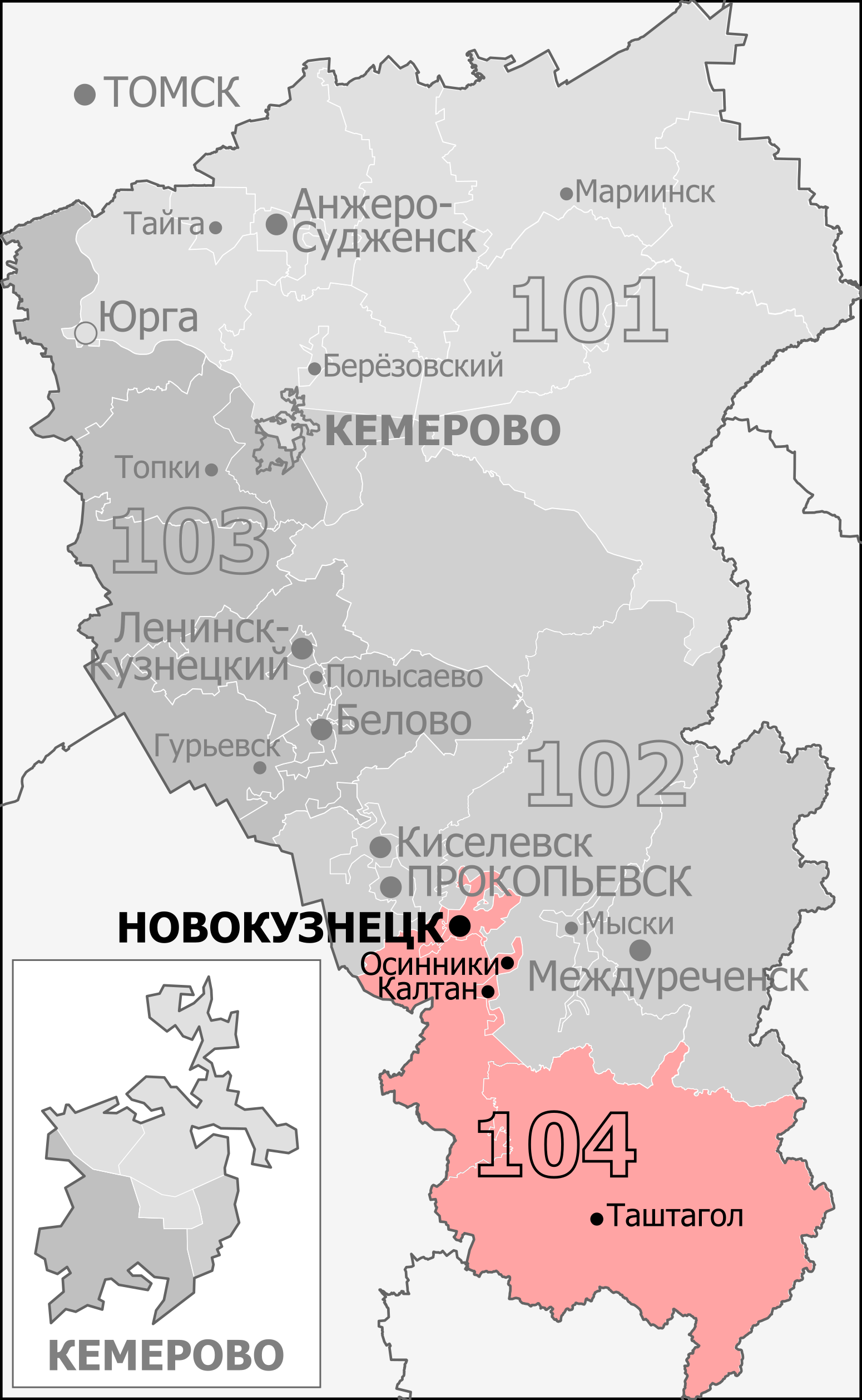
- Constituency boundaries since 2016
- Deputy: Oleg Matveychev; United Russia
- Federal subject: Kemerovo Oblast
- Districts: Kaltan, Novokuznetsk, Novokuznetsky (Kuzedeyevskoye, Sosnovskoye, Zagorskoye), Osinniki, Tashtagolsky
- Voters: 467,967 (2026)

The Novokuznetsk constituency (No.105 (Note: No.91 in 1993-1995 and 2003-2007, No.90 in 1995-2003, No.104 in 2016–2026)) is a Russian legislative constituency in Kemerovo Oblast. The constituency covers major mining city Novokuznetsk and southern Kemerovo Oblast.

The constituency has been represented since 2026 by United Russia deputy Oleg Matveychev, two-term State Duma member and political consultant, who won the open seat, succeeding two-term United Russia incumbent Alexander Maximov.

== Boundaries ==
1993–1995: Mezhdurechensk, Myski, Novokuznetsk, Novokuznetsky District
The constituency covered all of major industrial city Novokuznetsk, all of its suburbs and exurbs as well as neighbouring coal mining cities Mezhdurechensk and Myski.

1995–2007: Kaltan, Novokuznetsk, Novokuznetsky District (Kurtukovskoye, Orlovskoye, Sosnovskoye), Osinniki
After 1995 redistricting the constituency was slightly changed, it retained Novokuznetsk and some of its suburbs, losing the rest to Prokopyevsk constituency, in exchange for cal mining cities Kaltan and Osinniki to the south.

2016–present: Kaltan, Novokuznetsk, Novokuznetsky District (Kuzedeyevskoye, Sosnovskoye, Zagorskoye), Osinniki, Tashtagolsky District
The constituency was re-created for the 2016 election and retained almost all of its territory, switching some Novokuznetsk suburbs with Prokopyevsk constituency. This seat also gained Tashtagolsky District in the southern corner of Kemerovo Oblast from Prokopyevsk constituency.

== Members elected ==
Election	Member	Party
1993	Viktor Medikov	Independent
1995	Viktor Medikov	Independent
1999	Sergey Neverov	Independent
2003	Sergey Neverov	United Russia
2007	Proportional representation - no election by constituency	
2011	Proportional representation - no election by constituency	
2016	Alexander Maximov	United Russia
2021	Alexander Maximov	United Russia
2026	Oleg Matveychev	United Russia

== Election results ==
=== 1993 ===
Summary of the 12 December 1993 Russian legislative election in the Novokuznetsk constituency
Candidate	Party	Votes	%
Viktor Medikov	Independent	127,533	45.90%
Anatoly Tkachenko	Independent	37,022	13.33%
Aleksey Loginov	Independent	23,316	8.39%
Valery Myasnikov	Choice of Russia	14,211	5.12%
Yury Bubentsov	Independent	13,074	4.71%
against all		36,028	12.97%
Total		277,825	100%

=== 1995 ===
Summary of the 17 December 1995 Russian legislative election in the Novokuznetsk constituency
Candidate	Party	Votes	%
Viktor Medikov (incumbent)	Independent	61,517	21.76%
Albert Lensky	Communist Party	50,722	17.94%
Viktor Terentyev	Independent	48,391	17.12%
Aleksandr Nesterov	Liberal Democratic Party	22,148	7.83%
Yury Pyl	Independent	21,269	7.52%
Valery Myasnikov	Forward, Russia!	11,572	4.09%
Natalya Ignatyuk	Independent	11,183	3.96%
Oleg Vostretsov	Our Home – Russia	10,263	3.63%
Valentina Basargina	Independent	8,839	3.13%
Igor Bogdanov	Independent	4,911	1.74%
against all		26,826	9.49%
Total		282,707	100%

=== 1999 ===
Summary of the 19 December 1999 Russian legislative election in the Novokuznetsk constituency
Candidate	Party	Votes	%
Sergey Neverov	Independent	132,999	53.13%
Viktor Neustroyev	Independent	47,127	18.83%
Viktor Medikov (incumbent)	Independent	20,280	8.10%
Yelena Yamshchikova	Independent	14,177	5.66%
Sergey Yeremin	Independent	8,022	3.20%
Yury Pyl	Yabloko	6,888	2.75%
Aleksandr Bir	Independent	527	0.21%
against all		17,389	6.95%
Total		250,331	100%

=== 2003 ===
Summary of the 7 December 2003 Russian legislative election in the Novokuznetsk constituency
Candidate	Party	Votes	%
Sergey Neverov (incumbent)	United Russia	164,541	64.09%
Yelena Yamshchikova	Independent	31,661	12.33%
Andrey Krasakov	Liberal Democratic Party	13,825	5.39%
Aleksandr Gulnyashkin	For a Holy Russia	5,539	2.16%
Albert Korystov	United Russian Party Rus'	1,883	0.73%
against all		34,461	13.42%
Total		257,112	100%

=== 2016 ===
Summary of the 18 September 2016 Russian legislative election in the Novokuznetsk constituency
Candidate	Party	Votes	%
Alexander Maximov	United Russia	321,538	74.16%
Stanislav Karpov	Liberal Democratic Party	40,876	9.43%
Rostislav Bardokin	Patriots of Russia	35,723	8.24%
Leonid Burakov	Communist Party	13,677	3.15%
Aleksandr Zaytsev	A Just Russia	11,534	2.66%
Afanasy Yeremkin	Communists of Russia	3,742	0.86%
Yevgeny Yermakov	Party of Growth	3,426	0.79%
Total		433,567	100%

=== 2021 ===
Summary of the 17-19 September 2021 Russian legislative election in the Novokuznetsk constituency
Candidate	Party	Votes	%
Alexander Maximov (incumbent)	United Russia	181,859	59.02%
Tatyana Protas	A Just Russia — For Truth	25,884	8.40%
Maksim Parshukov	Liberal Democratic Party	25,457	8.26%
Nikolay Kochetkov	Communist Party	23,935	7.77%
Sergey Yevstiforov	Communists of Russia	11,281	3.66%
Dmitry Panfilov	Party of Pensioners	8,180	2.65%
Larisa Kosilova	Rodina	8,130	2.64%
Kirill Garbuzov	New People	7,512	2.44%
Vyacheslav Chernov	Yabloko	6,243	2.03%
Total		308,151	100%

=== 2026 ===
Summary of the 18-20 September 2026 Russian legislative election in the Novokuznetsk constituency
Candidate	Party	Votes	%
Oleg Matveychev	United Russia	193,348	61.71%
Leonid Burakov	Communist Party	39,948	12.75%
Maria Gorodeshtyan	Liberal Democratic Party	34,504	11.01%
Irina Zaytseva	A Just Russia	22,448	7.16%
Aleksey Barsukov	New People	8,625	2.75%
Nikolay Kalinogorsky	Yabloko	4,700	1.50%
Vasily Baykovsky	Rodina	4,172	1.33%
Total		313,321	100%
