= Tomskaya Pisanitsa Museum =

Open-air museum in Kemerovo, Russia

Coordinates: 55°40′04″N 85°37′15″E

The Tomskaya Pisanitsa Museum
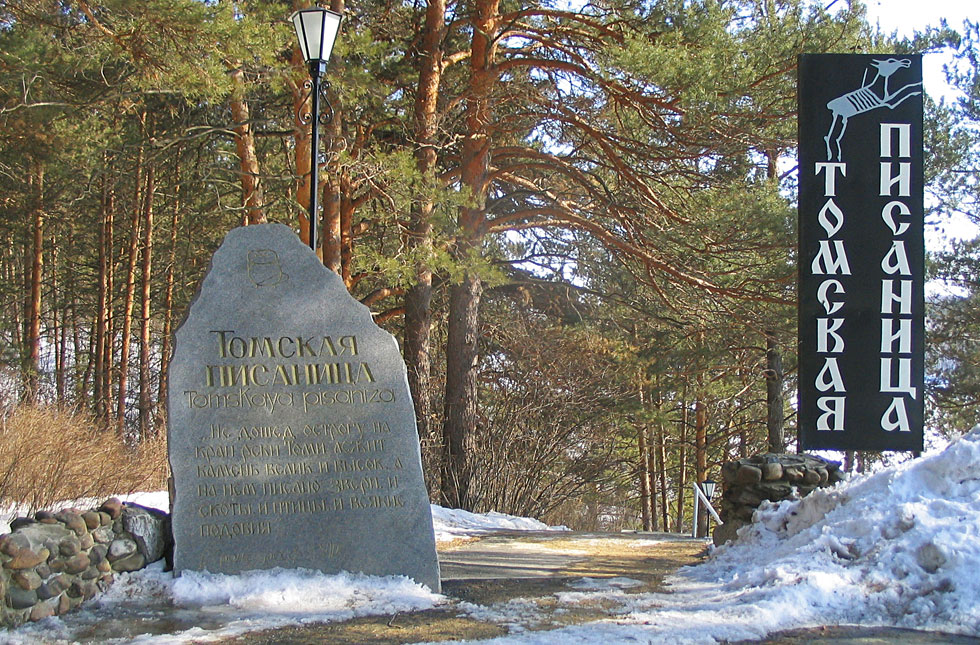
- Tomskaya Pisanitsa Museum
- Location: located some 50 km north-west of Kemerovo on the right bank of the Tom River in Western Siberia, Russia
- Type: open-air museum

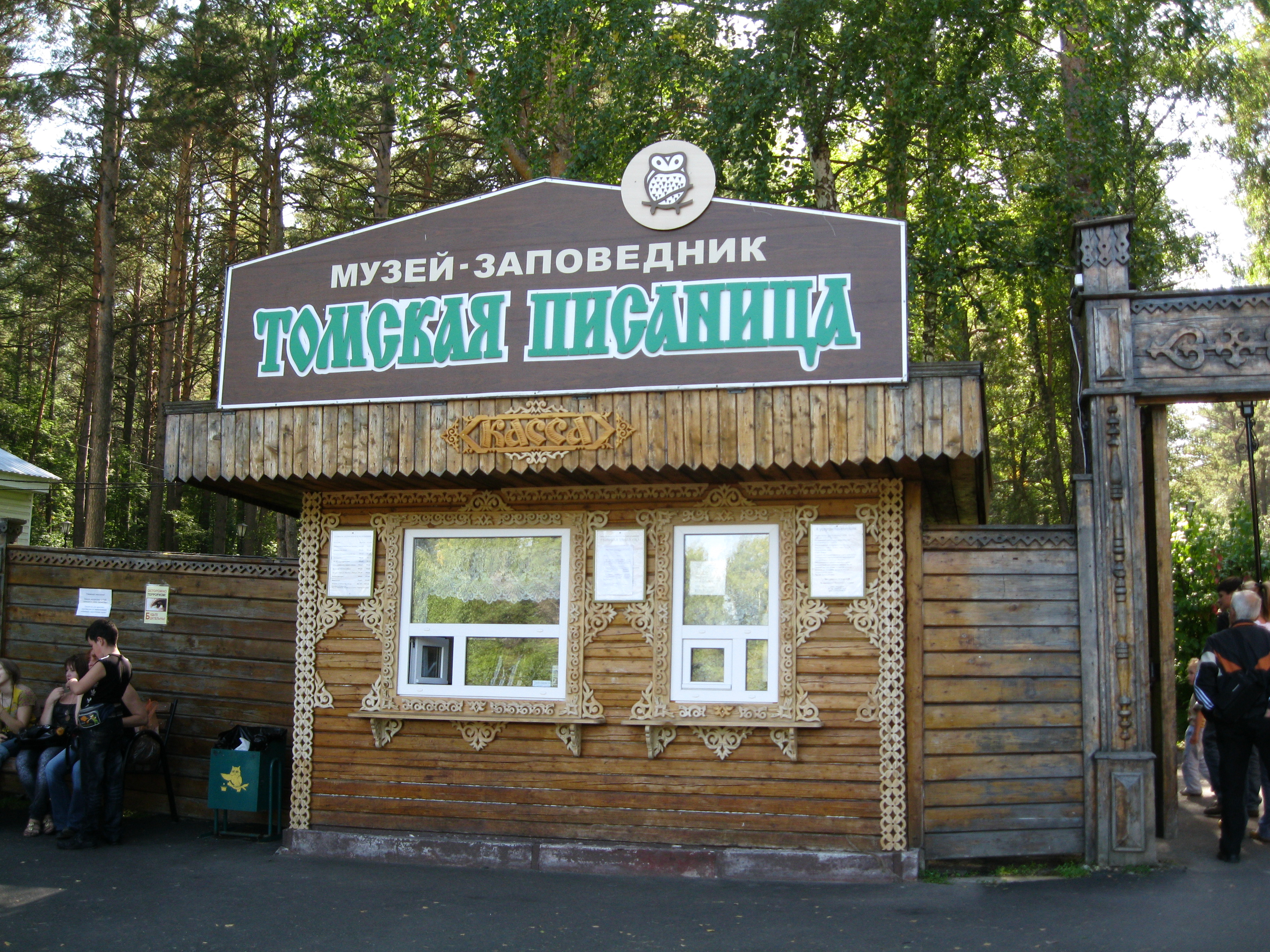
Tomskaya Pisanitsa museum entrance

The Tomskaya Pisanitsa Museum is a museum reserve (a type of an open-air museum) located some 50 km north-west of Kemerovo on the right bank of the Tom River in Western Siberia, Russia. It is famous for its 280 petroglyphs dating from 4000–1000 BC. The exhibition also includes reconstructions of ancient dwellings as well as some later cultural artefacts pertaining to the Shors people.

== About the museum-preserve "Tomskaya Pisanitsa" ==
In 2008 historical, cultural and natural museum-preserve "Tomskaya Pisanitsa" celebrated the 20-year anniversary. This unique museum was founded in accordance with the Resolution of the Council of Ministers of Russian Federation of February 16, 1988. But it took efforts of dozens of people, who devoted their life to study and protection of the world-famous primitive skill monument in different times, for this solution to take place.

Rock with the drawings of ancient people on the Tom River bank was opened at the turn of the 16th century. This rock has been attracting the attention of researchers through the ages.

The descriptions of the rock are contained in the works of well-known scholars and travellers from the 17th, 18th and 19th centuries: Stralenberg, Miller, Spasskiy and many others. In the middle of 20th century the Soviet researchers Okladnikov, Martynov, Bobrov, Borodkin, Bigler continued the study of Tomsk petroglyphs.

The completing stage of these long-term investigations is the work of A. P. Okladnikov and A.I. Martynov "The treasures of Tomsk Pisanitsy" (1972), and also articles in academic periodicals in the USSR and abroad. Science did its part, scientists helped contemporaries to understand the sense of life and the world view of ancient people, but they could not protect this monument from the natural destruction and from the vandals.

The group of scientists, teachers and students under the guidance of professor A. I. Martynov constituted the unique rock saving staff. Thanks to these people, the first restoration of monument was carried out, the famous stairs, which is today the main descent to the rock, were built, a public awareness campaign by publications, by radio and telecasts was launched, first excursions were organized.

In 1968 the territory around the Tomskaya pisanitsa was declared a preserved area, and to the middle of the 80th, no one had doubts that the Tomskaya pisanitsa must become the museum. The professional ethnographer Dr. V. M. Kimeyev had headed the new museum-preserve "Tomskaya Pisanitsa".

The bases of the museum functioning were laid at that time: the professional team of likeminded people was created, preservation zones and general plan of museum complex development were affirmed, the survey of locality was carried out and the output of advertising and souvenir production was set. The first comprehensive expeditions for funds acquisition and Russian and Shor (indigenous population of Tom's Region) traditional culture studying were carried out; the foundation of the formation of the ethnographical museum expositions "Shor ulus Kezek" and "Russian Siberian village" was laid.

From 1989 to 1991 as a result of archaeological expeditions downstream on the river Tom the research assistants of museum discovered new drawings on the rocks.

From 1991 to November 2004 Dr. G. S. Martynova headed the museum. This period in the history of museum-preserve "Tomskaya Pisanitsa" is marked by the appearance of new expositions, by the organization of scientific conferences and seminars. In 1995 museum-preserve organized international conference on the problems of ancient Rock Art and the archaeological complex "Archaedrom" and the Museum of the petroglyphs of Asia, which is today the largest Russian depository of the central Asian Rock Art collections, were opened. In 1996—1997 the expositions "Mythology and epos of Siberian peoples", "Slavonic mythology forest" were created and in 2000 exhibition complexes "Time and calendars" and "Living archaeology" were created. In the second half of the 90th the museum-preserve begins to take active part in the competitions and the museum forums and it gains acceptance in Russia and abroad:

- 1995 — the museum-preserve "Tomskaya Pisanitsa" was included in the President's list "The particularly valuable objects of the cultural heritage of the Russian Federation";
- 1997 — diploma of International museum biennale in Krasnoyarsk;
- December 1998 — the victory of I. D. Rusakova (the senior scientific worker of the section of petroglyphs) in the Kemerovo region's competition "Guide of year — 98";
- January 1999, Moscow — conqueror of the All-Russian competition of the establishments of culture in the nomination "The best provincial museum — 98";
- January 1999 — "The large gold medal" — the best object of museum demonstration on the exhibition "Siberian tourist fair — 99";
- March 1999, Moscow — diploma of the exhibition "lntermuseum-99" in the nomination "Soul of Russia";
- May 1999, Slovenia, Ljubljana — nominant of the competition of European Museum Forum "The best European museum";
- 1999, Krasnoyarsk — diploma of International museum biennale in the competition "Museum postcard";
- 2000 — grant of Soros' fund for the creation of exposition "Time and calendars";
- 2000 — grant of Soros' fund for the creation of exposition "Living archaeology";
- 2001 — grant of the President of the Russian Federation for the creation of architectural-ethnographical exposition "Russian Siberian village";
- 2004 — the laureate of the grant's competition of V. Potanin's fund "The changing museum in the changing world". Joint project with the State Russian Museum (Saint Petersburg) "Art therapy in the culture".

Since 2004 up to now the director of the museum-preserve is V. A. Kaplunov. In 2005 the reconstruction of museum-preserve was carried out. The traditions, established during the years of the museum formation, have got a new shot in the arm:

- 2005 — the official representative of the project "Velikiy Ustyug is Father Frost's native land";
- 2006, 2008 and 2009 — the museum-preserve "Tomskaya Pisanitsa" was the winner of Kemerovo region's competition "The best museum";
- 2006, 2007 and 2009 — grants of the President of the Russian Federation;
- 2009, 2010 — the web-site of the museum-preserve "Tomskaya Pisanitsa" was the winner of the competition "Golden site";
- 2010 — the museum-preserve "Tomskaya Pisanitsa" got the honorary title "National patrimony of Russia".

Today Museum-preserve "Tomskaya Pisanitsa" is a rapidly developing modern multiprofile cultural complex, which successfully combines museum specific character, scientific and cultural public awareness activity. Within 23 years, almost grassroots, it became the real museum of the 21st century and it is an honor for Kuzbass by right. Now the museum staff consists of more than 60 people, who work in the different departments: funds, excursions and tourism, science and exhibition, restoration and building, administrative and operational. Museum-preserve "Tomskaya Pisanitsa" is the favorite resting place of Kuzbass inhabitants and guests.

The politicians, businessmen, the representatives of culture and science, who stay in Kuzbass with business visits, attend Tomskaya pisanitsa.

In different years the museum was visited by many famous compatriots and worldwide famous celebrities, among them: multiple world chess champion Anatoly Karpov, cosmonaut Alexei Leonov, singers Dmitri Hvorostovsky and Valentina Tolkunova, famous traveller Yuri Senkevich, actor Pierre Richard and many others.

== Ancient sanctuary "Tomskaya Pisanitsa" ==
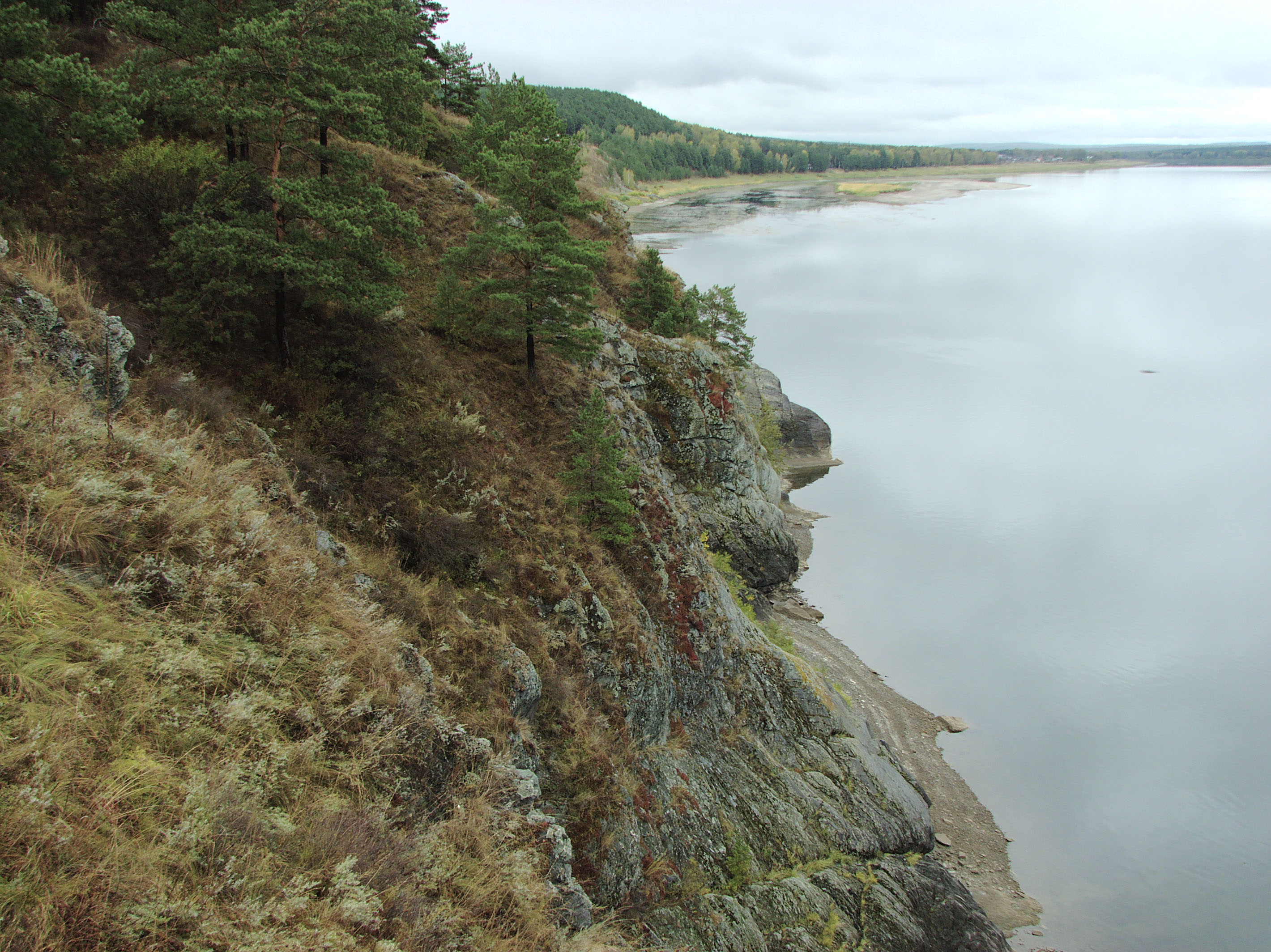
A view of the Tom river in the Tomskaya Pisanitsa museum

Tomskaya pisanitsa is situated on the right bank of the river Tom. Here the nature has created a unique place — smooth vertical stones and a small platform before them, a kind of scene. Ancient people could not but use this gift of nature. They have transformed this place into a sanctuary where they came to pray to the Gods, to ask them for successful hunting. The lead character of Tom's Rock Art is beautiful elk. Elks were not only objects of prey, they turned into objects of worship, into concentration of vital forces and power. About hundred figures of these animals are knocked out on the Tomskaya pisanitsa. Also we can see drawings of others representatives of fauna: bears, the fox, the wolf, birds. Many anthropomorphous images are on the Tomskaya Pisanitsa. These are schematic drawings of people, often wearing animal masks. Among the images solar signs are knocked out. The majority of the images of the Tomskaya pisanitsa date from the aeneolithic period and Bronze Age, 3rd and 2nd millennia BC. Drawings of boats and fantastic animals attract special interest. Many peoples of the world associate a boat with the idea of their relative's voyage down "the river of the dead", i.e. to the next world.

As a whole the basic idea of the sanctuary is the idea of fertility. The sanctuary served people during several millenniums. And today interest in this memorial has not weakened. Thousands of tourists come here to get acquainted with creativity of our remote ancestors.

== The architectural-ethnographical complex "Shor ulus Kezek" ==
"The Shor ulus Kezek" is the authentic complex of Shors' dwellings and household buildings of the late 19th and early 20th centuries, consisting of a dwelling "Em", a summer kitchen "Senek", a barn "Aimorok", a smithy, a bath-house "Melcha", a calf-house, a pigsty, a henhouse and a stable. At the end of the 19th century single-room izbas and five-wall huts borrowed from Russians became prevalent winter dwellings of the Shors. Along with these a log yurta "Senek" was also widely spread. Next to the farm a Shorian wedding hut — "green yourta", is reconstructed. It is traditionally utilized during the wedding as the ritual dwelling of fiance and bride.

The exposition "The house of shaman" (traditional timbered yourta is used), where the attributes of Shorian shaman and his mannequin are represented, tells about the pre-Christian beliefs of Shors.

On the whole, the complex exposition reflexes traditional material and spiritual culture of the Tatars of Kuznetsk, and also the influence of Russian culture and way of life. Museum conditions allow showing the monuments of material and spiritual culture of the peoples in realistic situations.

== "Mythology and epos of Siberian peoples" ==
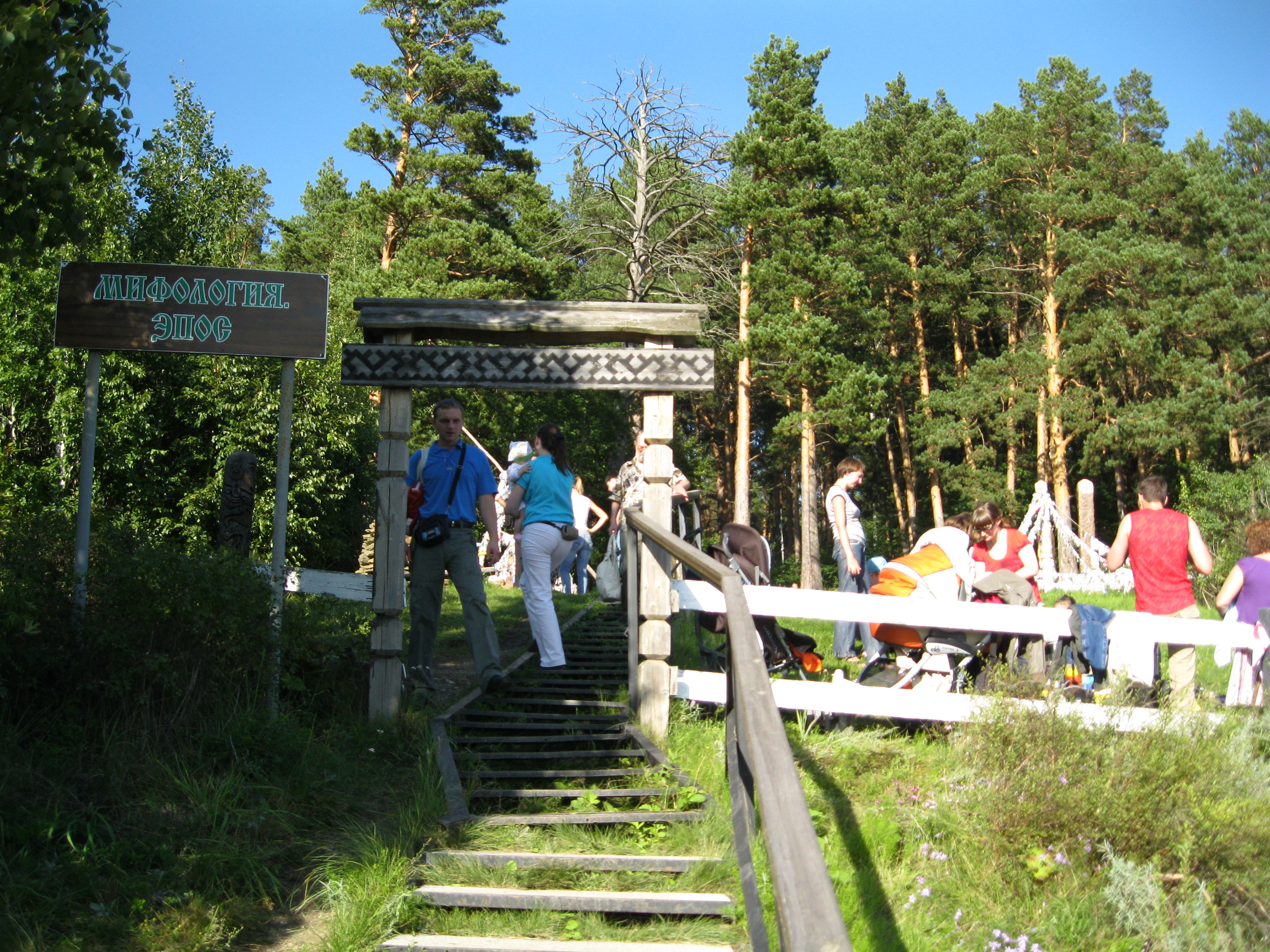
Mythological field in Tomskaya Pisanitsa museum

Myth-making is a very important phenomenon of the Siberian peoples spiritual history. It is a way of explanation and comprehension of the world, a primary form of human spiritual culture. Epos originates from myths as a form of collective verbal folk art. The epos of nationalities characterized by late appearance of written language and literature is especially plentiful. Siberian peoples belong to this category. The philosophy and the mythology of the nationality, its notions about the Universe, the unity of Man and Nature are reflected in epos.

The museum complex is situated on the cultic hill above the sanctuary "Tomskaya pisanitsa" and includes a gallery of ancient cult sculptures, a sacred tree and commemoration places of different epochs.

The purpose of exposition is to show the history of Siberian peoples at different times through the demonstration of their ideological conceptions. It includes the following objects: the "sacred tree", the sculptural means of mythology (sculpture mockups of the Bronze Age — early Iron Age), credences of different time, the sacred rock altars and the cult places of Siberian peoples. This complex is fully based on historical reconstructions.

== "Archaedrom" and "Living archaeology" ==
The "Archaedrom" complex — the reconstruction of the ancient dwellings and burial places. "Archaedrom" is the concentrated show of archaeology. It consists of the natural area reconstructions of ancient houses of the Siberian peoples of the Bronze Age, the early Iron Age and the Middle Ages, pavilion of natural burials.

"Living archaeology". The reconstruction of the ancient technology: metal-smelting, bone-processing, pottery, loom-knitting, javelin-throwing and archery.

== "Slavonic mythology forest" ==
"Slavonic mythology forest" — the reconstruction of pagan sanctuaries. The exposition opened in 1997. The settlement of the Siberian lands has started since the beginning of 17th century according to the plans of Russian government and today in the popular majority of Siberia are the Russians. The influence of the pre-Christian layer of Slav culture was determining in the formation of Russian orthodox tradition. Before the adoption of Christianity the Slavs were heathens and they carried out rites in heathen temples.

At present the scientists agreed to consider the heathen temple as the place of devotions.

One of the most interesting heathen sanctuaries is the sanctuary of Perun near Veliky Novgorod in Peryn district on Il'men lake. The heathen temple erected at "Tomskaya Pisanitsa" is the halved reconstruction of this sanctuary. A platform is paved with flagstone to make the inspection more convenient. For the same purpose the ditch is substituted with stones lined on the edge of lobes. On the exposition in the center of the heathen temple there is a copy of the Zbruch idol. The Zbruch idol is the 10th-century sculpture. This is one of the rare monuments of Slav heathen cult, which was found near Gusyatin village in river Zbruch (inflow of Dniester) in 1848. After the adoption of Christianity it was probably thrown into the water (like the idols of Perun in Kiev and Novgorod). Zbruch idol is a tetrahedral column with three tiers of patterns: in the lower underground deity is depicted, on the average there are the earth and people, in the upper — the sky and gods (attributes of the main god are a horse and a sword).

The head of Zbruch idol has 4 faces: Mokosh, Lada, Perun and supposedly Dazhdbog, it is covered with the Russian princely cap (spherical cap with fur edge).

Slavs kindled ritual fires in the heathen temples. These bonfires were started from the "living fire" — a need-fire.

The construction for the fire obtaining is represented at the exposition. Around the heathen temple there are located the mockups of the main Slav idols: Rod — the ancestor of the universe, Rozhanitsy the celestial mistresses of the world, Veles — "skotiy god" (god of cattle), Rugiewit — the god of war and the judge of souls in the afterworld, Svarog — the father of the sun god, Svetovid — fertility god, Chur — the guard of boundaries, Yarilo — the deity of the sun and fertility.

The heathen temple is enclosed circle-wise with a wooden paling, on which the skulls of sacrificial animals are hanged. Circle and oval are magic figures for the Slavs. Atheartical excursion "Perun warrior initiation" is conducted on the exposition.

== The museum of Asian Rock Art ==
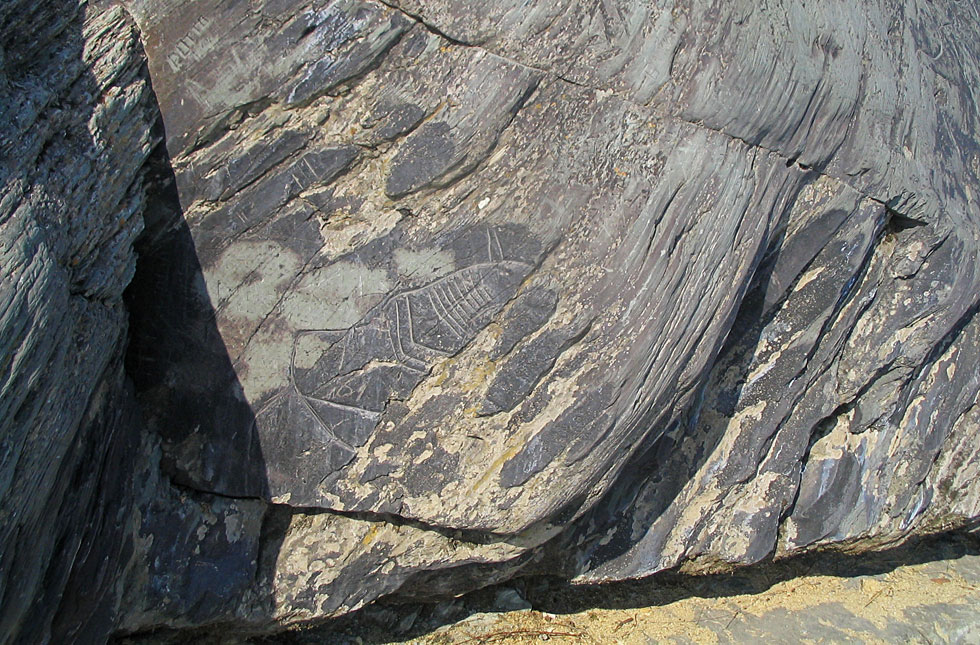
A fragment of ancient man's picture at Tomskaya Pisanitsa

Rock Art is a large part of the world history, culture and art. It reflects outlook of our ancestors. By the example of Rock Art we can understand the way of ancient people's life. Therefore, each memorial of Rock Art is of great interest not only for scientists, but also for everyone who is interested in history and art.

One can visit individual rock art memorials, but because of their specific nature and hard accessibility it is impossible to examine such a memorial as a whole, to see it as a work of art, as a sphere of human spiritual life. Toward this end we have established the first Russian museum of Asian rock art. Its exposition displays the most typical complexes of Eurasia rock art. The basis of the museum is formed with genuine material from Siberia, Far East, Kyrgyzstan, Kazakhstan, Mongolia, Korea, China, India, Pakistan and others. In the museum you can see Neolithic art (4th-3rd millennia BC), the art of the Bronze Age (late 3rd — early 1st millennia BC), the art of the Iron Age (7th century BC — early 1st millennium AD), the art of the Middle Ages (the second half of the 1st millennium AD) and the rock art of 18th and 19th centuries. Now the museum-preserve "Tomskaya Pisanitsa" is the largest depository of Asian Rock Art collections in Russia.

== Museum of Natural History (historical geology, mineralogy, paleontology) ==
Open show of material on historical geology and mineralogy of Kuzbass and Tom river region. The examples of coal are presented here. Also there is exhibition material on paleontology.

== Museum complex "Time and calendars" ==
A museum complex "Time and calendars" demonstrates the organic unity: space — nature — time — man — calendar. Museum "Time and calendars" opened in August 2000, at the start of millennium.

At the exhibition there are represented the calendar systems of different ages and countries. They are placed against "the wall of time", on which the main events of human history are shown.

== Architectural and ethnographic complex "Russian Siberian village" ==
On the territory of the museum-preserve "Tomskaya Pisanitsa", on the basis of architectural monuments of Pisanaya village and transported buildings the work on the creation of a historic-ethnographical exposition complex "Russian Siberian village" is in hand. "Russian Siberian village" is situated near the museum on the territory of village Pisanaya.

Pisanaya village was founded in the middle of 17th century. In 2006 the first exposition of the complex — "Siberian Yasak Zimovye" was opened. It consists of a housing tower and a barn modeled after buildings of 17th century.

== "Mongolian yurt" ==
The prefabricated felt yurt satisfies the conditions of Mongolian nomadism. It takes a heavy load of a wind thanks to the streamline contour. The cover from white felt is pressed to the wooden skeleton with hair rope. In the center of the yurt there is a fireplace. A floor is covered with felt and there is placed a felt carpet over it. The man's half of the yurt is on the left hand of the entrance. The interior of the yurt has a rich color scheme. The furniture and wooden structures are painted red or orange and ornamented. The entrance of the yurt overlooks south. Proportions of the yurt recreate the model of a sundial. An exact time of day is defined according to a place of solar beam falling in the yurt. The internal yurt layout is divided conditionally into 12 parts according to the cycle of calendar chronology. The parts are named after months of east calendar. The yurt was received as a gift of the Governor of the Kemerovo region A. G. Tuleev in 2000.

== The "Fairy tale" zone where is the residence of Siberian Father Frost in winter ==
In the exposition there are presented the main characters of Russian fairy tales; in winter the "Residence of Father Frost" is open. In December, 2005 the Russian Father Frost from Veliky Ustyug visited Kuzbass. He had presented credentials about the fact that the museum-preserve "Tomskaya Pisanitsa" is the representation of the Russian Father Frost in the Kemerovo region. An opportunity to have a rest in preserved corner of Kuzbass for the whole family, to see expositions, to visit a minizoo and to take part in the game program with children became a good tradition of the townspeople.

The Kuzbass Father Frost gives children the certificate, which says that they have visited his Residence. There also works the mail of Father Frost. The children of all region write letters to the Kuzbass Father Frost. The Residence works from December till March.

== The nature of the museum-preserve "Tomskaya Pisanitsa" ==
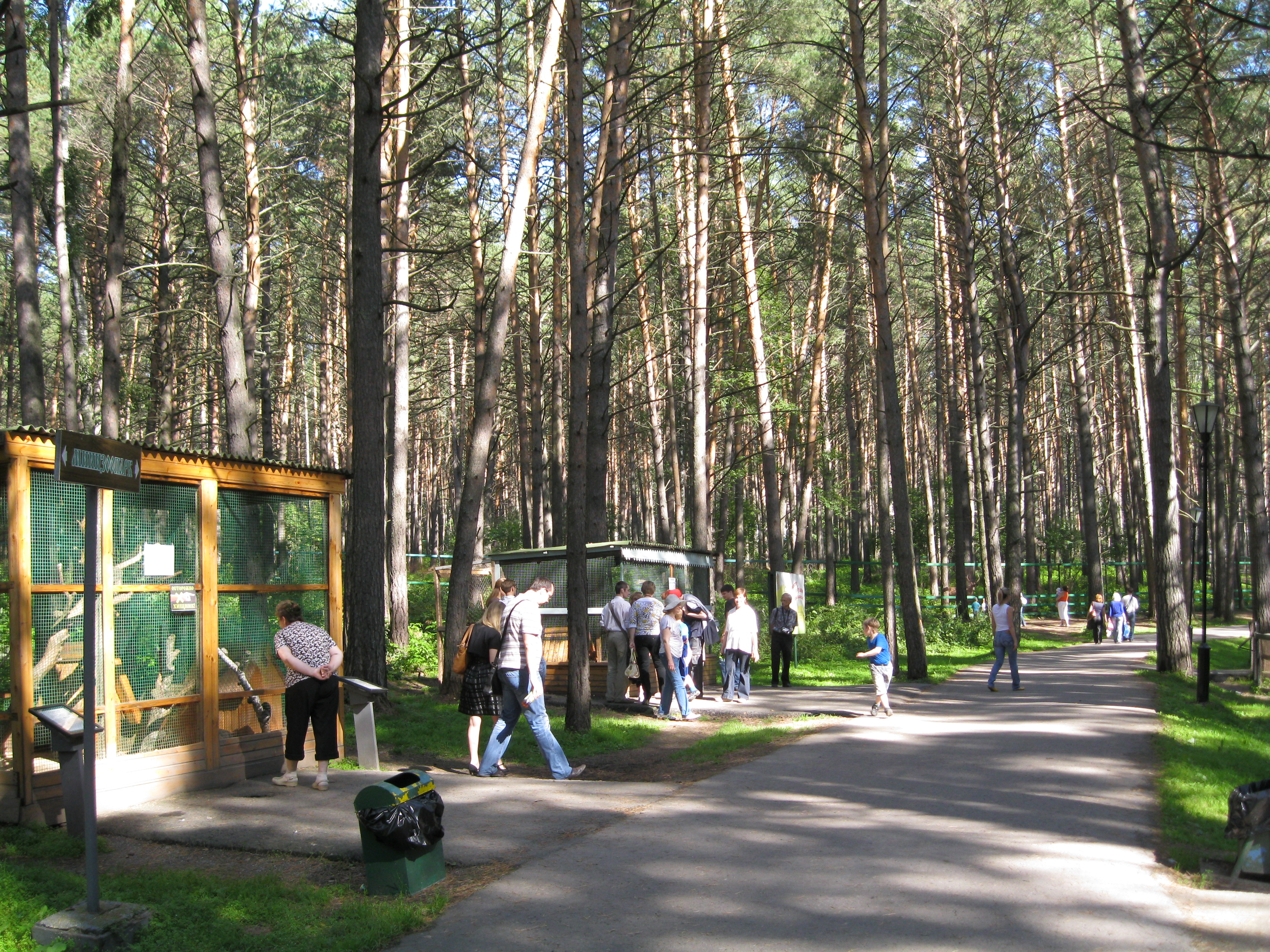
Minizoo in Tomskaya Pisanitsa museum

A pine forest occupies about 90% of the preserve territory. Along the river Pisanaya one can see bush woods of flood plain willow beds. Stony southern slopes of the bedrock Tom bank are covered with steppe plants. Here one can meet such plants as Pteridium aquilinum, Aegopodium podagraria, Carex macroura, Lilium martagon, Adenophora liliifolia, Pyrda media, dozens of meadow grass species. Steppe vegetation includes such rare for the region plants as Dianthus versicolor, Viola rupestris, Allium nutans, Festuca valessiaca, Stipa capillata, Thymus serpyllium. The fauna of the museumpreserve "Tomskaya Pisanitsa" is also varied. An ancient moose path leading to a ford across the Tom intersects the preserve and mooses frequently go along it. In winter one can meet wolves and lynxes here. Foxes, minks, kolinskies, ermines, weasels, badgers, hares, squirrels, chipmunks are the museum-preserve residents. There are many small rodents here — mice and voles, 3 species of bats, shrews.

The fauna of birds is very diverse, it consists of about 150 species. Among them 60 species are nesting, the rest are transit and wintering. In summer one's attention can be attracted by vultures gliding over the river, chaffinches singing in the forest, wagtails running along the bank. Here one can meet large falcons which are registered in the Red Book of Russia. In winter one can meet bullfinches, waxwings, polar owls. During all seasons the forest is alive with numerous tomtits, woodpeckers and nuthatches. Two species of poisonous snakes inhabit the territory of the museum-preserve — the ordinary adder and the copperhead, the viviparous and the agile lizards, the gray toad and the pointed-muzzled frog.

On the territory of "Tomskaya Pisanitsa" one can see plenty of varied insects, spiders, mollusks.

There is a mini-zoo on the territory of the museum-preserve "Tomskaya Pisanitsa". It is the only stationary zoo in Kemerovo region. As an adoptive parent's of our animals, your gift will be directed to the zoo's animal care.

Museum-preserve "Tomskaya Pisanitsa" appreciates to all organizations and private persons who have shown sincere interest and active participation in fate of the zoo's animals.

== Sts. Kirill and Methodius Chapel ==
The idea to build the wooden chapel in the museum-preserve "Tomskaya Pisanitsa" belongs to Kuzbass' Governor A. Tuleev. It was built in 2008. This chapel was named in honor of Sts. Kirill and Methodius. Sts. Kirill and Methodius created the bases of Slav written language, literature, science, culture. They translated the Bible, sacred and chapel books to Slav language. Sts. Kirill and Methodius Chapel is unique: its height is 33 meters, it was built according to the canons of Old-Russian architecture of the best types of wood (pine and larch).

== The Holidays ==
During the activity of museum-preserve the holiday culture became its integral part. The largest holidays are Christmas, Shrovetide, Easter, Whitsun and Ivan Kupala Day (Feast of St. John the Baptist). In March 2006 the holiday "Chyl-Pazhi" took place in the territory of museum for the first time. This is the New Year of the Sayan-Altai region peoples. "Chyl-Pazhi" is the national holiday of the peoples of the Sayan-Altai (which include Shors and Teleuts, native residents of the Kuzbass), in Russian translation it is "the head of year". The first rays of "new sun" fall on this head in the days of the vernal equinox. In the past this holiday opened new life cycle and it was particularly significant for the peoples of the Sayan-Altai.

Traditional Festival of bell ringers "Rings over Tom" takes place in the day of Whitsun.

Day of animal protection is grandly celebrated on 4 October in the museum-preserve "Tomskaya Pisanitsa".

"The bear mutuel" is the new project of Kemerovo region administration, hockey club "Kuzbas" and museum-preserve "Tomskaya Pisanitsa". It has attracted attention of the public. Pigeon-toed zoo inhabitants predicted events of bandy matches.

The realization of folklore holidays on the territory of the museum is an old tradition.

The preservation of the original folk culture and the acquaintance with it of the mass audience, is undoubtedly the significant moment in the work of museum.

== Services ==
- Walking tours through the museum-preserve
- Cafe. Gift shop
- Bike and ski hire
- Ice-run. Riding. Snowmobiling
- Walks on a boat
- Baggi-cross-country (driving an all-terrain vehicle)
- Quad riding
- Attraction "A happiness smithy" (stamping of coins)
- Archery
- Summer houses near the territory of museum-preserve

For the corporate customers

- Corporate events on the museum's territory.
- The theatrical performances: "Perun warrior initiation",
- "Shaman's kamlaniye".
- The rite "The sacrifice to world tree".
- The interactive excursion "Search for treasure".
