= Shors =

Turkic ethnic group in southwestern Siberia

Total population
- 11,500

Regions with significant populations
- Kemerovo Oblast (Gornaya Shoriya), Russia Significant population centres
- Russia: Kemerovo Oblast; Khakassia: 10,507

Languages
- Shor, Russian

Religion
- Russian Orthodox, Shamanism

Related ethnic groups
- Chulyms, Khakas, Fuyu Kyrgyz, Tubalars, Kumandins, Chelkans, Siberian Tatars, Kyrgyz, Abas

Resettlement of the Shors in the Siberian Federal District by urban and rural settlements in %, 2010 census

Shors or Shorians (Shor: sg. шор-кижи, shor-kizhi, тадар-кижи, tadar-kizhi, шор, shor, тадар, tadar, pl. шор-кижилер, shor-kizhiler, тадар-кижилер, tadar-kizhiler, шорлар, shorlar, тадарлар, tadarlar) are a Turkic ethnic group native to Kemerovo Oblast of Russia. Their self designation is Шор (tr. Shor). They were also called Kuznetskie Tatars (кузнецкие татары), Kondoma Tatars (кондомские татары), Mras-Su Tatars (мрасские татары) in some of the documents of the 17th and 18th centuries.

Most Shors live in the Tom basin along the Kondoma and Mras-Su Rivers. This region is historically called Mountainous Shoria. The Shors also live in Khakassia and Altai Republic. According to 2002 census, there were 13,975 Shors in Russia (12,601 in 1926, 16,042 in 1939, 14,938 in 1959, 15,950 in 1970, 15,182 in 1979 and 15,745 in 1989). The Shors speak their own Shor language.

== History ==
=== Early history ===
The Shors as a people formed as a result of a long process of intermixing between Turkic, Ugric, Samoyedic, and Yeniseian tribes. Their culture and origins are similar to those of the northern Altaians and some of the ethnic groups of the Khakas.

An ancient Turkic legend recorded in the Chinese annal (Book of Zhou 周書, 636 CE) mentions the origin of the Göktürks' ancestors from a possession or state named Suǒ (索國; MC: *sak̚-kwək̚), located "north of the Xiongnu country" (which, in this case, apparently meant Mongolia).

The region where the Shors currently reside was Turkicized under the influence of the Yenisei Kyrgyz during the medieval period. The Shors resulted from this ethnic mixing and adopted Turkic speech (the Shor language) as a result. Shor tribes began to become a distinct people around the 8th and 9th centuries AD. The Mongol conquest of the Altai-Sayan region in the 13th century added another layer of cultural influence over the local population and their languages. The region subsequently fell under the influence of the Oirats from the late 14th century to the early 17th century. Although Mongol control of the area was nominal, many of the languages (including Shor) contains significant amounts of Mongol loanwords. The Shors were a valuable asset to the Yenisei Kirghiz and Oirats as suppliers of ironware. Their ability to smelt iron from ore was a feat that only one other indigenous Siberian people (the Yakuts) were able to achieve before the Russian advance into the area.

=== Early modern history ===
In the early 17th century, the Shors and their territory were conquered by the Russians. In the 18th century, Russian settlers began to move in to the area. The Shors' niche as producers of ironware for the Oirats, Altaians, and Kyrgyz was soon eroded by the Russian traders. The Russians had more advanced products to offer and this effectively ended Shor blacksmithing. Atop of this, Russian officials subjected the Shors to pay yasak in the form of furs. This resulted in most Shors abandoning their old occupations and villages to move to nearby towns so they can make a better living as hunters. However, they lived in squalid conditions. The use of nettle-fibre or wild hemp for clothing, primitive implements, and techniques continued on towards the 20th century.

=== Modern history ===
The Shors were little affected by the Russian Revolution and its civil war until the Bolsheviks took the region in 1920. In 1929, the Shor National Region was formed but was quickly dissolved in 1939. The okrug (district) was disbanded because the Soviet authorities believed its existence might hinder the development of the iron and coal industries in the region. These minerals became important to the state after deposits were discovered in the Kuznetsk Basin in the 1930s. This discovery led to a new wave of Russian settlers and workers to the region which led to the displacement of the Shors. The authorities considered the Shors to be numerically insignificant and that disenfranchising them would inconsequential to the state. The Shors greatly suffered as a result. They were driven out of their farms and villages and forced to work in the coal mines. The population of the Shors declined and the urban Shors struggled with alcoholism, drug addiction, suicide, and high lethal accident rates. Traditional Shor culture began to wane. The liberalization of Soviet rule beginning in the 1980s led to a Shor cultural revival and the establishment of many cultural and linguistic institutions (like the creation of The Association of Shor People in the 1990s). However, the Shors still face many issues. Many Shors do not know their native language and show indifference to their traditional culture. Illness, discrimination, environmental racism, high death rates but low birth rates, drug and alcohol addiction, and the possibility of the Shors being swallowed up by the dominant Russian culture in the near future are issues the modern Shors face.

== Religion ==
=== Christianity ===
The Shors were originally practitioners of shamanism and animism but were converted to Russian Orthodox Christianity during Russian rule since the early 17th century. Conversions occurred rapidly after the establishment of the Altai Spiritual Mission in the 1830s. Most present Shors are Russian Orthodox Christians.

=== Shamanism ===
Despite the conversion of Christianity among the Shors, shamanism has had and still is very important and influential to modern Shor spirituality. Shor Shamanism and its kam (shamans) have suffered persecution since Russian colonization of the region especially from the 17th to 20th centuries. The establishment of the Altai Spiritual Mission in the region resulted in the severe persecution of shamanism and the kam. Christian missionaries routinely lambasted Shor shamanism as being a dark cult and the kam as servants of the devil. There were many forced conversions to Christianity as well. During the soviet era, the authorities frequently designated the kam and others as enemies of the state and sentenced them to camps or even death. Graves, drums, ritual clothing, and more were burned or desecrated during this period. Shor shamanism saw a revival starting in the late 1980s and is considered a vital part of modern Shor identity.

== Culture ==
=== Economy ===
The Shors were mainly engaged in hunting, fishing, some primitive farming, and pine nut picking. Blacksmithing and iron ore mining and melting were also important (hence, the name "Blacksmithing Tatars"). The lifestyle of the Shors changed significantly following the October Revolution of 1917. Most became farmers, cattle-breeders, or industrial workers.

=== Family and clan structure ===
The Shors were able to retain much of their ancient clan structure over the years. Each clan was traditionally led by a chief. Chiefs were elected in large clan gatherings. At such gatherings important decisions, conflicts, and other issues were settled. Features of their society included matrilocal marriages, exogamy, a classisfactory system of kinship terms, and the belief in certain taboos that revolve around the former. Clans routinely organized communal hunts and shared the spoils equally among themselves. However, this clan system eroded beginning in the mid-nineteenth century under the Russian influence of separating families into individual units. A family now relied on a money economy and this soon resulted in wealth disparity and differentiation in Shor society.

=== Environment ===
Environmental activist Alexander Arbachakov won a Whitley Award for his work preserving sustainable communities in Shor territory. The coal, iron, gold, and timber resources of the region are extracted by companies that show little regard to the Shors and the environment of the area. The Shors receive no direct financial benefits for the extraction of these minerals on their land. This has made some Shor feel ignored as minerals are often taken from places the Shors consider sacred.

=== Music ===
Throat-singing is an ancient and traditional form of music in Shor culture. Epic stories about heroes and deities are popular and often accompanied by singing and the use of a kai-komus (two-stringed wooden instrument).

=== Education ===
The first educational institution for the Shors was a missionary school that was established in the village of Kuzedevo around 1860. After 1867, the most talented graduates had the chance to continue their education at the College of Catechism in Kazan. However, the literacy rates of the Shors remained very low. The Soviet administration opened ten schools and a children's home in 1921–22 in the village of Kabyrza. Within ten years, the number of schools in the region increased. Libraries and clubs were opened to abolish illiteracy. By 1932, a college to train teachers had 300 students including 70 native Shor speakers. By 1936, 114 schools (100 primary and 14 secondary) existed in the area. The use of Shor in the 1920s and the rising educational standards of the Shors led to an intellectual growth of the people, including skilled artisans teachers, and those with medical and technical qualifications. Shor writers, journalists and clerks became prominent in what had previously been a largely illiterate society for the first time. Shor intellectual culture began to decline after the dissolution of the Shor National Region in 1939 and the removal of Shor as a language of instruction in schools in 1943. The teacher's college was closed while Shor intellectuals were repressed or killed fighting in the Great Patriotic War. The post-war period proved stagnant for Shor intellectual culture. The resurgence of the Shor identity beginning in the 1980s has led to a revival in traditional Shor culture and the establishment of new educational programs for native teachers, students, and the younger generation.

== Shor mythology ==
=== Creation myth ===
The universe was originally empty until the god Ul'gen created the three skies. He placed his son Paktan in the lowest sky. He then placed a spirit called Keikush in the middle sky while he and his wife Chaasin lived in the upper sky. Ul'gen's younger brother, Erlik, decided to create things himself. Erlik created the mountains, birds, and other animals. Meanwhile, Ul'gen created man but didn't know to make human souls and as a result the man he created was nothing more than a lifeless husk. He then set out on a journey in search of a soul and left a hairless dog to protect man in his absence. Erlik saw his chance and made his way to the man. The dog refused to let him pass but Erlik made a deal with the dog. If the dog lets him pass, he'll give him fur. Erlik passed and the dog's body grew fur. Erlik proceeded towards the lifeless man, spat on him, rubbed dirt on him, and left.

Ul'gen returned with his aim failed and saw the condition of the man and dog. The dog revealed what happened and Ul'gen wondered whether Erlik knew how to create souls. He summoned Erlik and he replied that he knew how to create souls. With no other options, Ul'gen agreed that Erlik would create the soul of man if he can have their souls. However, the body of man would belong to Ul'gen. Erlik used a tube made out of a hollow angelica stem and placed the tube in man's mouth. Erlik blew the soul through the tube and into man's body. Ul'gen soon wanted to banish Erlik from Earth but Erlik pleaded to Ul'gen to give him a corner of land for him to live in. Ul'gen raised his staff and a hole opened up where it was resting. Snakes, insects, and other creatures crawled out onto the Earth and Erlik climbed down the hole to the underworld.

=== The worldview of the Shors ===
The Shors traditionally believed that the universe was divided into three levels which were:

- The Heavenly Realm (Ul'gen Cheri): Realm of the god Ul'gen. This world is further divided into nine "skies" (see below for more information).
- The Middle Earth (Ortinda or Pistin Cheri): Our physical world. Said to be flat with the Pistag (or Mustag) Mountain lying at its center.
- The Underworld (Aina Cheri): Realm of the god Erlik and his minions.

All these realms were said to be populated by spirits, humans, animals, and other creatures. The three worlds were linked via the axis of the World Tree or Mountain. The top of the World Tree housed the Heavenly Realm whilst its trunk passed through the Middle Earth and its roots reached down to the Underworld. The World Mountain was divided similarly with its peak connected to the Upper World and the foot of the mountain to the Earth.

==== Divisions of the Heavenly Realm ====
The Heavenly realm is further divided into nine "skies". By ascending order these include:

1. The Yellow Sky (keshkan): Realm of lightning.
2. The Blue Belt (kok kur): Realm of the blue portion of the rainbow.
3. The Red Belt (kizil kur): Realm of the red part of the rainbow.
4. The Grey Belt (kir kur): Realm of the Grey portion of the rainbow.
5. The Indigo Belt (kektamosh-kur): Realm of the "blue" (indigo) part of the rainbow.
6. The Red Sky (kizil tegri): Realm where the mysterious "red women" are said to live.
7. Realm of the moon and stars.
8. Realm of the sun.
9. Personal realm of Ul'gen. This realm is always lit, warm, and full of life. Vegetation never dies and there's always a plethora of cattle and animals. It's also described as a place where the bodies of the dead never decay.

=== Spirits and deities ===
Traditional Shor mythology boasts a range of deities and spirits. Some of these include:

- Ul'gen: The god of the Heavenly Realm. Ul'gen is able to grant people anything when addressed through the kamlanie (shamanic ritual).
- Chaashin (or Solton): Ul'gen's wife.
- Paktan: Ul'gen's son.
- Erlik: The god of the underworld.
- Aina: Sinister spirits that dwelled in the underworld and were helpers of Erlik. They were said to be able to steal a person's kut (spirit).
- Ker palyk: A powerful ancient fish that lives in a lake located at the foot of Pistag/Mustag Mountain.
- Ak pozat: A white majestic horse belonging to Ul'gen. Lightning is said to be the whip of Ul'gen as he rides ak pozat.
- Che ezi (master spirit of the place): Spirits that dwell in our world in specific locales like mountains, rivers or forests. They are protective spirits that must be respected when entering their domain. There are many elemental forms of che ezi depending on their dwelling place. Some types also reside in the Heavenly Realm.
- Samchi: A che ezi that lives in the Yellow Sky. He lives in the middle of this sky with his family in a home similar to that of humans.

Other popular deities the Shors recognized (along with other Turkic peoples) included:

- Tengri: The ancient Central Asian god of the sky. Shor clan elders led the Prayer to the Sky while the shamans rarely did.
- Cher-Sug (Earth-Water): Deity that rules over the earth spirits and guardians of the mountains, forests, rocks, and rivers.
- Umay: Goddess of fertility and birth. For the Shors, she was the guardian of newborns, children, mothers, and the spirit guide for the deceased.

== See also ==
- Turkic Christians

== Bibliography ==
- Akiner, Shirin. (1986). Islamic Peoples of the Soviet Union: With a Appendix on the non-Muslim Turkic Peoples of the Soviet Union. London: Routledge. ISBN 0-7103-0025-5
- Arbachakov, Alexander & Luba. (2008). The Last of the Shor Shamans. Moon Books. ISBN 978-1-84694-127-6
- Forsyth, James. (1992). A History of the Peoples of Siberia: Russia's North Asian Colony 1581-1990. New York: Cambridge University Press. ISBN 0-521-47771-9
- Mote, Victor L. (1998). Siberia: Worlds Apart. Boulder, CO: Westview Press. ISBN 0-8133-1298-1
