= Fedor Chispiyakov =

Russian writer

Fedor Stepanovich Chispiyakov (Russian cyrillic: Фёдор Степанович Чиспияков, Mezhdurechensk, Kemerovo Oblast, 1906–1978) was a Soviet writer. He is described as the father of the Shor language literature in the books История Кузбасса (History of Kuzbass) and Сказки Сибири и Севера (Tales of Siberia and the North).

He studied in Moscow and came back to Siberia to work as a teacher.

== Works ==
- Шолбан, 1934
- Чулеш, Таныш, among other, 1940s
