= Osinnikovsky =

Osinnikovsky (masculine), Osinnikovskaya (feminine), or Osinnikovskoye (neuter) may refer to:

- Osinnikovsky Urban Okrug, a municipal formation, which the town of Osinniki, Kemerovo Oblast, is incorporated as
- Osinnikovsky (rural locality), a rural locality (a settlement) in Novosibirsk Oblast, Russia
