= Aba (Russia) =

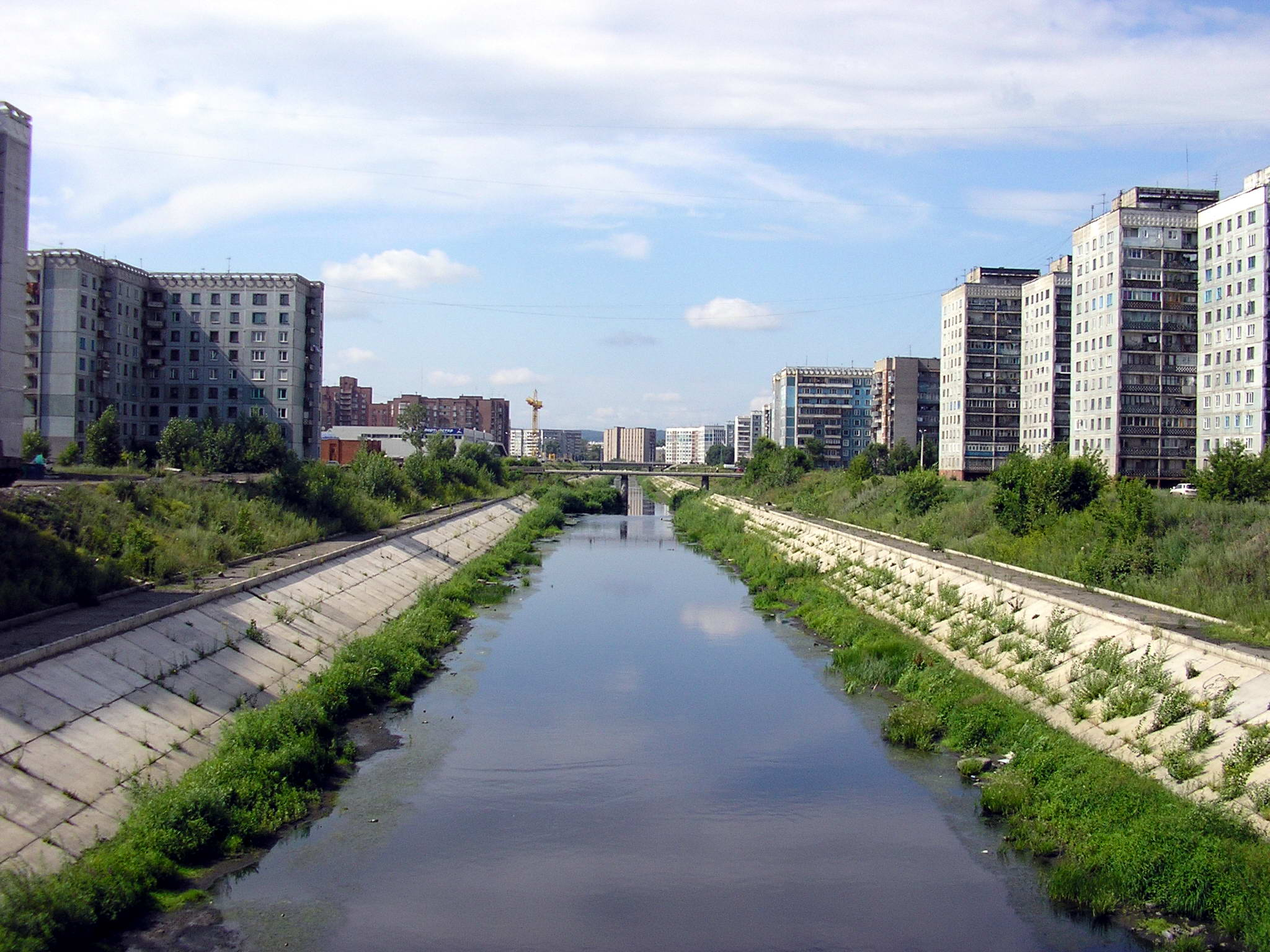

- Mouth

Location
- Country: Russia

Physical characteristics
- Mouth: Tom
  - coordinates: 53.7744°N 87.137°E
- Length: 71 km (44 mi)
- Basin size: 867 km^{2} (335 sq mi)

Basin features
- Progression: Tom→ Ob→ Kara Sea

The Aba (Russian: река Аба) is a river in Russia; a left tributary of the Tom. It flows across the steppes, and merges with the Tom near Novokuznetsk. It is 71 kilometres (44 mi) long, and has a drainage basin of 867 square kilometres (335 sq mi). There are coal deposits in the river's basin. The Aba people live in the river's vicinity.
