= Myski =

Myski Мыски
- Town
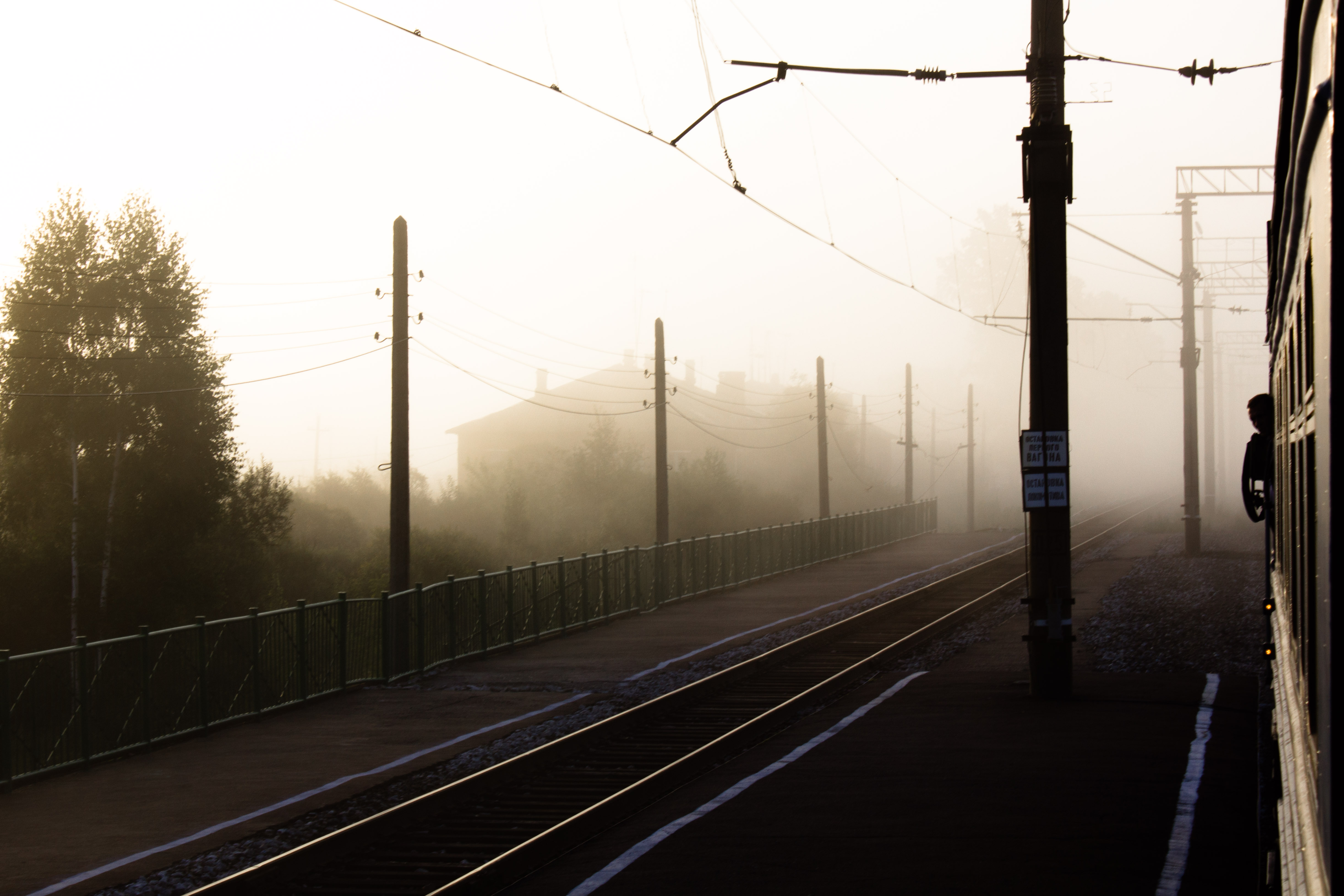
- Rail line through Myski

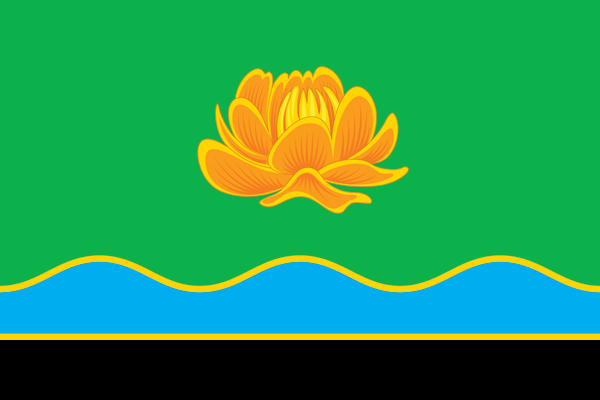
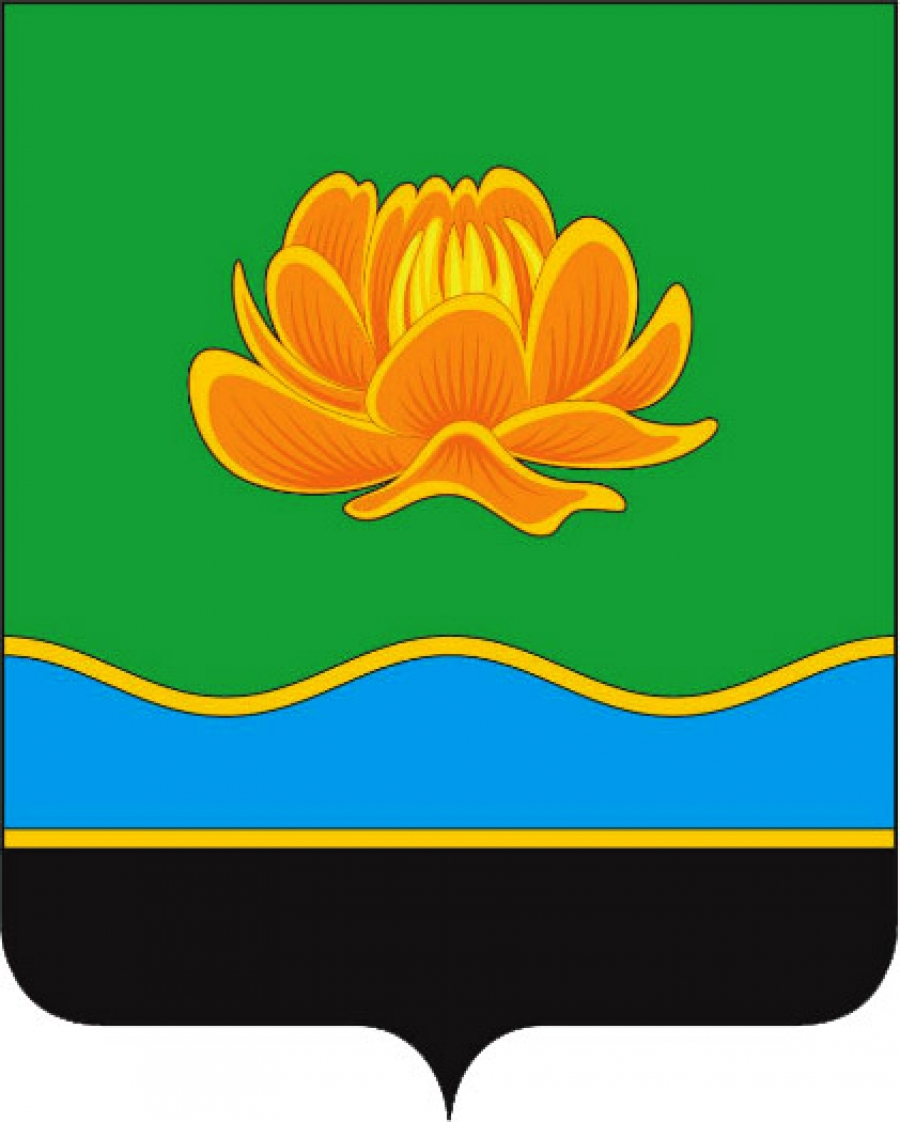
- Flag Coat of arms
- Interactive map of Myski
- Location of Myski Myski (Kemerovo Oblast)
- Coordinates: 53°42′N 87°49′E
- Country: Russia
- Federal subject: Kemerovo Oblast
- Founded: 1826
- Town status since: 1956

Population (2010 Census)
  - Total: 43,038
  - Estimate (2025): 38,720 (−10%)

Administrative status
  - Subordinated to: Myski Town Under Oblast Jurisdiction
  - Capital of: Myski Town Under Oblast Jurisdiction

Municipal status
  - Urban okrug: Myskovsky Urban Okrug
  - Capital of: Myskovsky Urban Okrug
- Time zone: UTC+7 (MSK+4)
- Postal code: 652840–652860
- OKTMO ID: 32728000001
- Website: www.myskiadmin.ru

Myski (Russian: Мыски; Shor: Томазақ, romanized: Tomazaq) is a town in Kemerovo Oblast, Russia, located at the confluence of the Mras-Su and Tom Rivers, 350 kilometers (220 mi) southeast of Kemerovo. Population: 43,038 (2010 census); 44,435 (2002 census); 45,964 (1989 Soviet census).

== History ==
It was established as the village of Mysovskaya (Мысовская), also called Myski and Beryozovy Mys (Берёзовый Мыс). It was granted town status in 1956.

== Administrative and municipal status ==
Within the framework of administrative divisions, it is, together with fourteen rural localities, incorporated as Myski Town Under Oblast Jurisdiction—an administrative unit with the status equal to that of the districts. As a municipal division, Myski Town Under Oblast Jurisdiction is incorporated as Myskovsky Urban Okrug.
