= Ushayka =

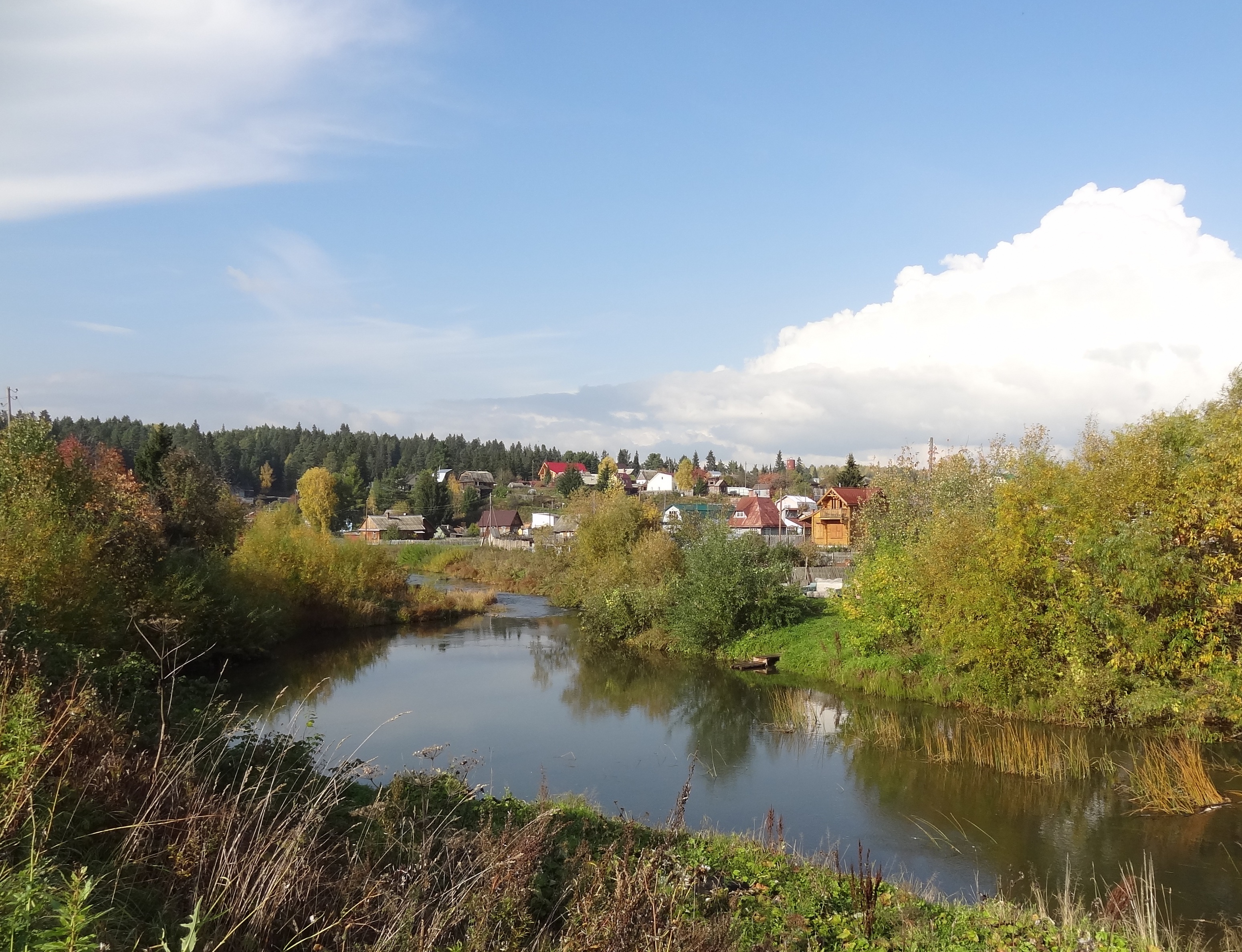

Location
- Country: Russia

Physical characteristics
- Mouth: Tom
  - coordinates: 56.4789°N 84.9449°E
- Length: 78 km (48 mi)
- Basin size: 744 km^{2} (287 sq mi)

Basin features
- Progression: Tom→ Ob→ Kara Sea

The Ushayka (Russian: Уша́йка) is a river in Russia, right tributary of the Tom. Its length is 78 kilometres (48 mi). It has a drainage basin of 744 square kilometres (287 sq mi). Its source is in the Kuznetsk Alatau (a northern continuation of the Altay Mountains), and it flows through the territory of Tomsk Oblast. It flows into the Tom approximately through the central part of Tomsk.

According to a local legend, the river's name descends from name of a youth, Ushay (Russian: Ушай), a sweetheart of beauty Toma, who gave her name to Tom.

The Ushayka was navigable in the 19th century, but now it is no longer used for navigation. The Ushayka divides Tomsk into northern and southern parts; there are more than ten bridges over it. In its upper reaches the Ushayka is a forest river, very cold even in the middle of summer and clear. When it gets to the territory of Tomsk, Ushayka becomes rather dirty due to large amount of manufacturing and domestic water flowing into it.
