= Alexander Maximov (politician) =

Russian politician

- Александр Максимов
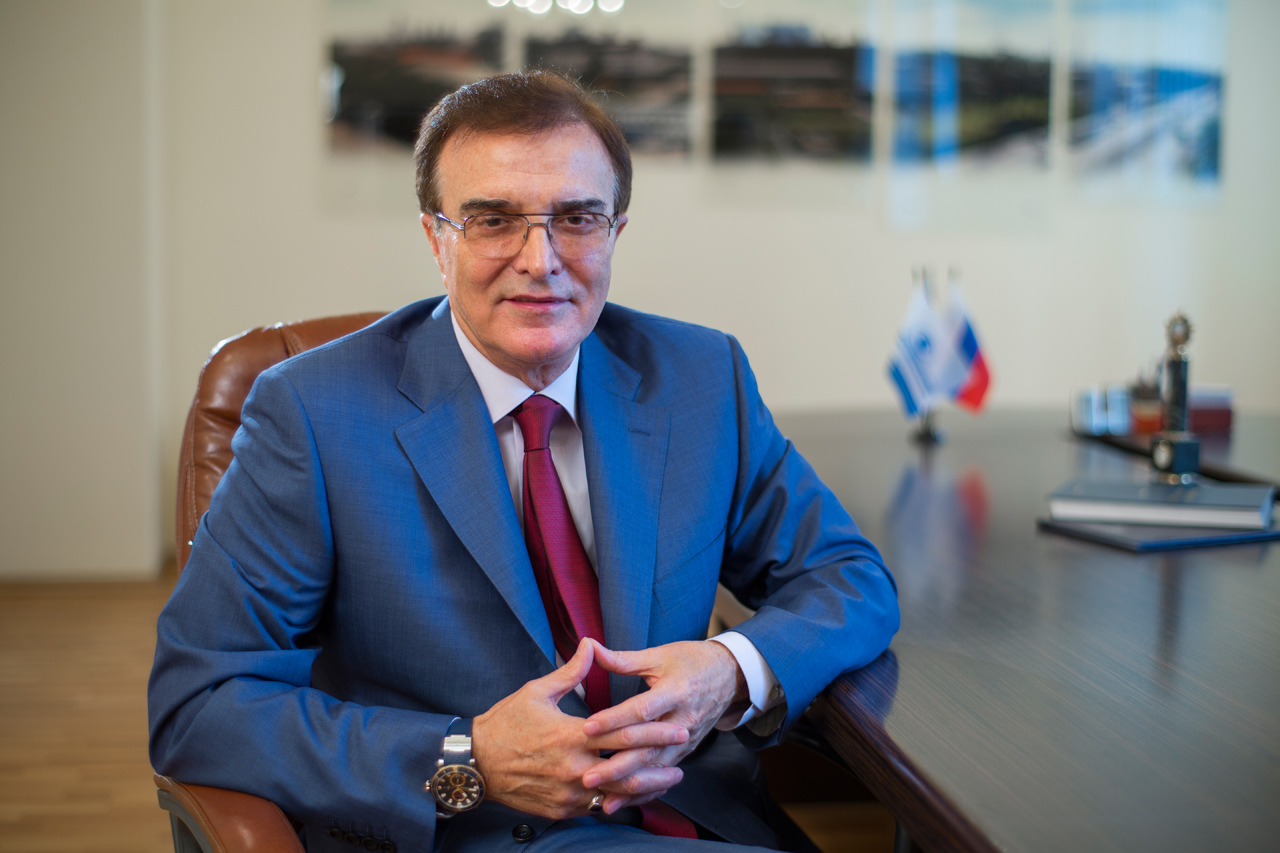

Member of the State Duma for Kemerovo Oblast
- Incumbent
- Assumed office 5 October 2016
- Preceded by: constituency re-established
- Constituency: Novokuznetsk (No. 104)

Personal details
- Born: 15 November 1946 (age 79) Zlatoust, Chelyabinsk Oblast, Russian SFSR, USSR
- Party: United Russia; CPSU (formerly)
- Education: Chelyabinsk Polytechnic Institute; Higher School of the KGB

Alexander Alexandrovich Maximov (Russian: Александр Александрович Максимов; born 18 November 1946, Zlatoust, Chelyabinsk Oblast) is a Russian political figure and deputy of the 7th and 8th State Dumas. In 1998, he was granted a Candidate of Sciences in Technical Sciences degree.

From 1975 to 2000, Maximov served at the KGB in Chelyabinsk Oblast. From 2001 to 2004, he worked as the Deputy General Director for Economic Security at the Chelyabinsk Electrometallurgical Plant. On 8 September 2013 he was elected deputy of the Kemerovo Region Council of People's Deputies of the 4th convocation. In 2016, he was elected deputy of the 7th State Duma. Since September 2021 he has served as deputy of the 8th State Duma.
