= Kondoma =

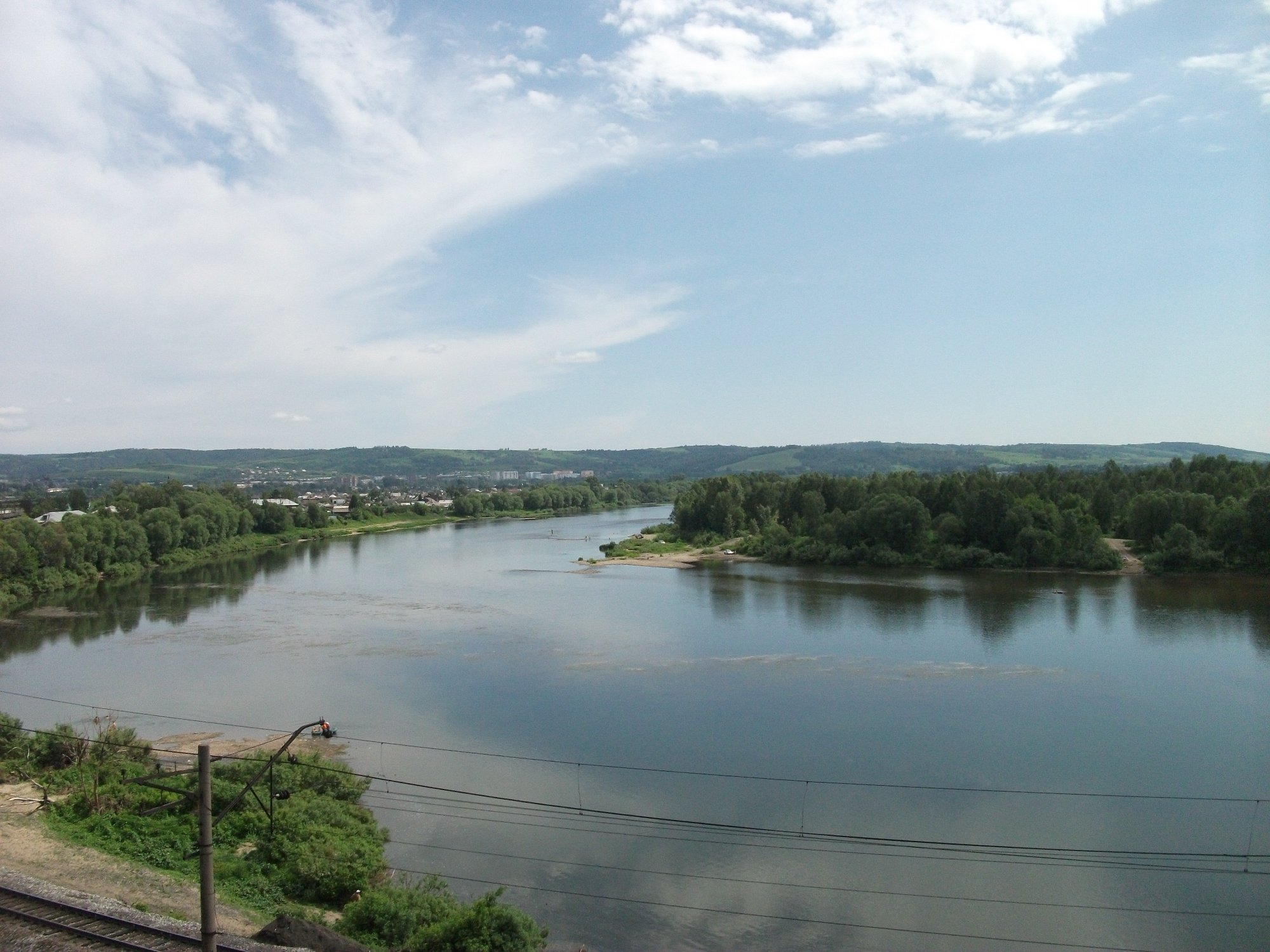
- The Kondoma near Osinniki in June 2011

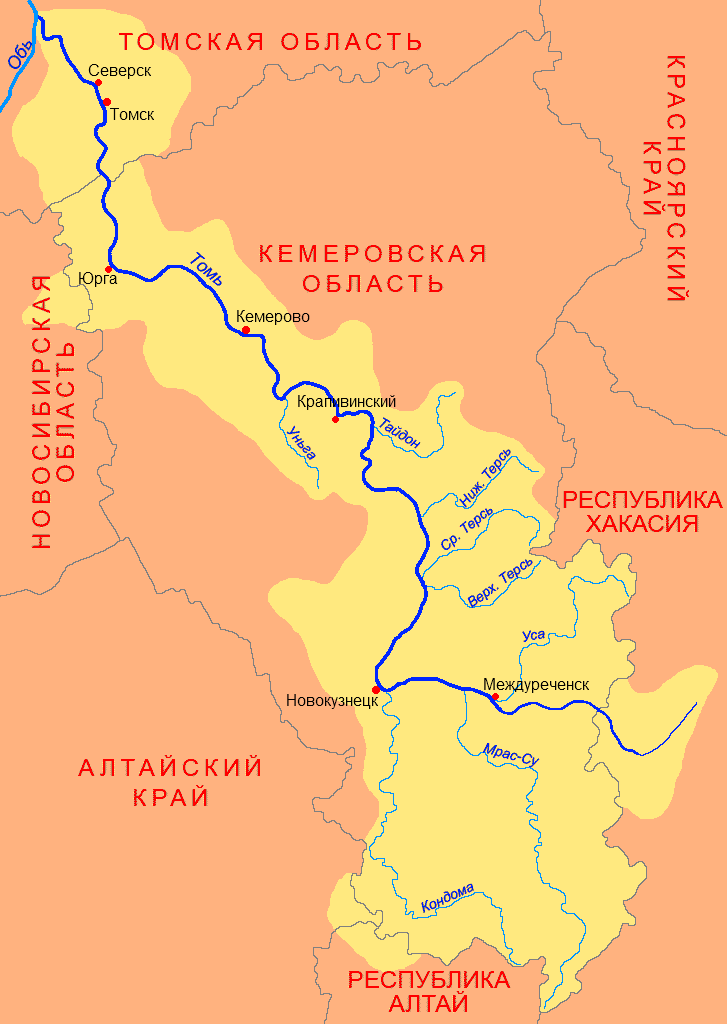
- Map of the Tom River watershed
- Native name: Кондома (Russian)

Location
- Country: Russia
- Federal subject: Kemerovo Oblast
- Cities: Osinniki, Tashtagol, Kaltan

Physical characteristics
- Mouth: Tom
  - coordinates: 53°44′43″N 87°11′26″E
- Length: 392 km (244 mi)
- Basin size: 8,270 km^{2} (3,190 sq mi)

Basin features
- Progression: Tom→ Ob→ Kara Sea
- Tributaries
  - left: Antrop
  - right: Mundybash

The Kondoma (Russian: Ко́ндома; Shor: Қондум, romanized: Qondum) is a river in Kemerovo Oblast, Russia. It is left tributary of the Tom. It is 392 kilometres (244 mi) long, with a drainage basin of 8,270 square kilometres (3,190 mi^{2}). The towns of Tashtagol, Osinniki and Kaltan are situated by the Kondoma. Its main tributaries are the Mundybash, Tesh, and Telbes rivers. It flows into the Tom in Novokuznetsk.
