= Aba people =

Aba-Kizhi

Languages
- Shor

Related ethnic groups
- Other Shors

The Aba (Russian: Аба), who also call themselves the Aba Kizhi are a clan of the Shor people of Russia. They live along the Tom River in the general vicinity of Novokuznetsk. Although in the past they were at times considered a distinct people, they are now considered to be Shor. They are also called Abantsy, Aban, Abin and Abintsy.

== Sources ==
- Wixman, Ronald. The Peoples of the USSR: An Ethnographic Handbook. (Armonk, New York: M. E. Sharpe, inc., 1984) p. 1
