= Mrassu =

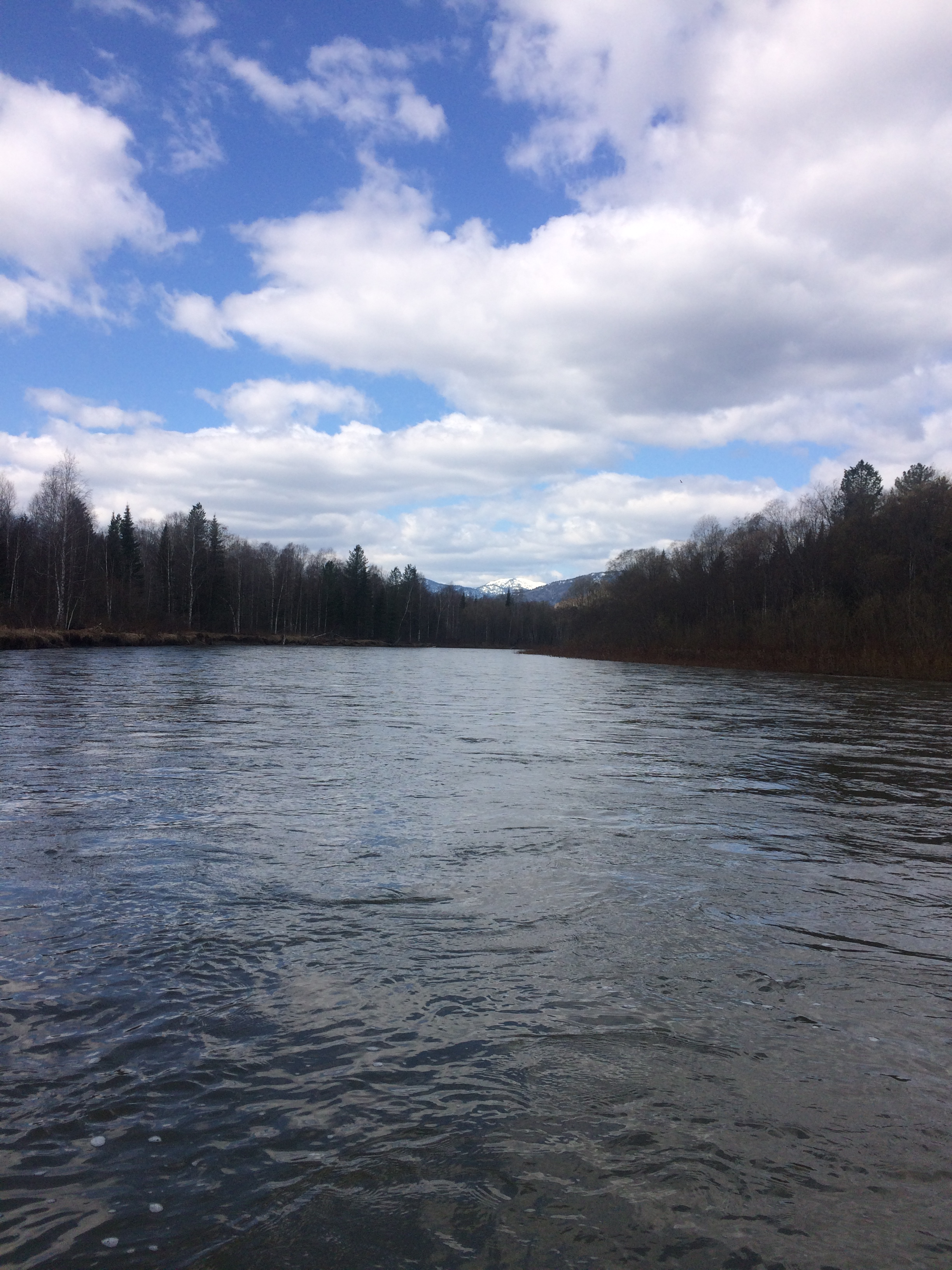

Location
- Country: Russia

Physical characteristics
- Mouth: Tom
  - coordinates: 53.7486°N 87.7986°E
- Length: 663 km (412 mi)
- Basin size: 17,600 km^{2} (6,800 sq mi)

Basin features
- Progression: Tom→ Ob→ Kara Sea

The Mrassu or Mras-Su (Russian: Мрассу́ or Мрас-Су́, Shor: Прас, Пырас, Пырас-суғ, romanized: Pras, Pıras, Pıras-suğ) is a river in Kemerovo Oblast, Russia. It is a left tributary of the Tom (in the Ob's drainage basin), and has its sources in the Abakan Range. It is 338 kilometres (210 mi) long, with a drainage basin of 8,840 square kilometres (3,410 mi^{2}). The Mrassu joins the Tom near Myski.

The Mrassu freezes from mid-November to April. The water flow at Myski averages at 155 square meters per second (1668 ft^{3}/sec) every year with a minimum of 24.4 m^{3}/sec (262 ft^{3}/sec) in February and a maximum of 694 m^{3}/sec (7470 ft^{3}/sec) in May.
