= Oleg Matveychev =

Russian politician (born 1970)

Oleg Matveychev MP
- Олег Матвейчев
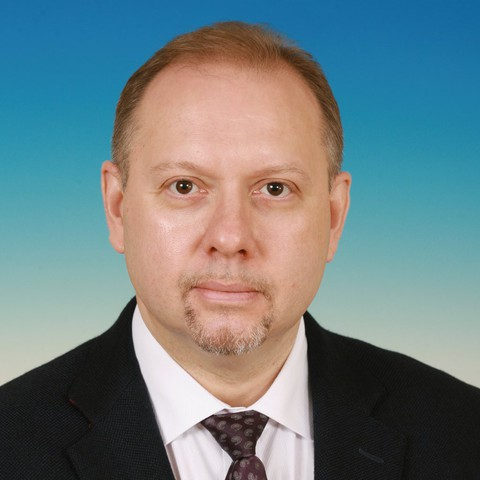
- official portrait, circa 2021

Member of the State Duma (Party List Seat)
- Incumbent
- Assumed office 12 October 2021

Personal details
- Born: February 1, 1970 (age 56) Novokuznetsk, Kemerovo Oblast, RSFSR, USSR
- Party: United Russia
- Education: Ural State University; RANEPA; Russian Academy of Science (DPhil)
- Occupation: Political consultant
- Website: matveychev.ru/

Oleg Anatolyevich Matveychev (Note: also transliterated as Oleg Anatolievich Matveichev) (Russian: Олег Анатольевич Матвейчев, born 1 February 1970) is a Russian political consultant and politician, who is currently a deputy of the State Duma. Matveychev is also a professor at Financial University under the Government of the Russian Federation in Moscow and has published various books on politics and public relations. He is one of the most popular Russian bloggers.

== Career ==
In 1993 Matveychev graduated in philosophy from the Ural State University. He then completed a PhD in the philosophy of politics and law with the thesis topic of Philosophy of Hegel's Politics and Modernity. From 1996 he became an active political consultant for Russian regional elections and participated in over 60 campaigns. From 2007 to 2020 he was professor of National Research University – Higher School of Economics.

== Politics ==
From 2006 to 2010 Matveychev was a staff member of Presidential Administration of Russia. In 2010 he became deputy governor of the Vologda Oblast. In 2011 he became deputy governor of the Volgograd Oblast. In 2021 Matveychev was elected as a member of the 8th Russian State Duma.

=== Controversy ===
In 2010, according to the Guardian newspaper, Matveychev caused controversy by writing on his blog that "he dreamed of gathering the Russian opposition on a city square and calling in an army of tanks to mow them down. 'And then, like after Tiananmen in China, we would also have 10% annual economic growth after 20 or 30 years'".

Matveychev is an opponent of copyright. He was involved in at least two plagiarism scandals, where Matveychev was the one whose writings were plagiarized, once by Anna Chapman, and a second time by the Russian Minister of Culture Vladimir Medinsky in his book "Myths about Russia", particularly in the chapter about "unwashed Europe" and "clean Russia". Matveychev had announced that he is not going to pursue any action as the copyright impedes innovation and "behind every thought or object is every human being who ever lived".

Matveychev is an author of an alternative theory about the ending of the Trojan War, with the Trojans as winners.

Additionally, Matveychev was behind the idea to change the name of a real person to Harry Potter to participate in Yekaterinburg regional elections.

=== Alaska Comments ===
During the 2022 Russian invasion of Ukraine, Matveychev made a series of demands directed towards the United States and NATO. He proposed a list of various demands for once the invasion succeeded, including that the US immediately end all sanctions against Russia and to aid their economic recovery, return the State of Alaska, and Fort Ross, California, both of which were historically Russian territories voluntarily given up during the 19th century. He also demanded that the continent of Antarctica be recognized as Russian territory, citing that it was discovered by Russian explorers. His proposition was widely mocked and condemned on social media, notably by Mike Dunleavy, the Governor of Alaska, who stated, "Good luck with that! Not if we have something to say about it."

=== Sanctions ===
Matveychev was sanctioned by the United Kingdom from 15 March 2022 in relation to Russia's actions in Ukraine.

== Books ==
- Political Consulting in Russia: yesterday, today, tomorrow, 2020
- Austrian engineering philosophy for polytechnics, co-author, 2019
- Hyperborea – Adventures of an Idea, co-author, 2018
- Solzhenitsyn's Vatnik, co-author, 2018
- Myths About Corruption, co-author, 2018
- Practical Sophism: Prohibited Methods, co-author, 2018
- Modern Myths About Russia, co-author, 2018
- Russia and China. Two strongholds. Past, Present, Prospects , co-author, 2017
- Information wars of the 21st century. "Soft power" against the atomic bomb, 2016
- Crimean Spring. 30 days that shook the world, co-author, 2014
- Trojan Horse of Western History, co-author, 2013 (translated to English)
- Ears that Wag the Ass – Modern Social Programming, 2002, 2008, 2013
- Imperative Mood of History, 2012
- Russia, What to Do? Breakthrough Strategies of the New Millenium, 2011
- American Lard, fiction, co-author, 2009
- The sum of political technologies, 2008
- The Sovereignty of Spirit, 2007
- The Big Current Political Encyclopedia , 2007, co-author
- Anti-psychology. The modern man in search of meaning, co-author, 2004
- China at the Junction of the Milleniums, 2004
- Electoral campaign – Practice Against Theory, 2001
- Political оntologies , 2001
- Problems of manipulation, 1999
- What is political consulting?, 1998

== Selected articles ==
- Stages of development of Russian market of political technologies, 2018
- Philosophy as a sovereign truth and other educational skrepy(metaphysical feuilleton), 2018
- Hyperborean problem in XIX-XX centuries, 2018
- Neue Wege mit Heidegger Matveichev O.A., Pertsev A.V., 2018
- On the question of the historicity of the Trojan War, 2017
- Russian Thought on the Origination of Greek Philosophy, 2017
- Anacharsis." A wise man, because the Scythian, 2016
- Towards a discussion about the origins of the ancient Greek philosophy in Russian and Soviet philosophical thought, 2016
- About approaches of studying the ancient Greek sophistry, 2016
- The Seven Wonders of the Hyperborean Abaris, 2016
- Famirid. The Blind Philosopher, the Inventor of Music, 2016
- Orpheus: a phenomenon from the North (asking the question), 2015
- The Aristotle's concept of" slavery", 2013
- The origin of the anthropomorphism in Greek religion, 2013
- Public relations of the modern school: working with target audiences. The handbook for the educational refresher training program "School management based on communicative technologies", 2002
- The study guide on the history of modern Western philosophy", 2002

== Charity work ==
Matveychev is on the board of "Right to Smile", a children's charity set up by ex-spy Anna Chapman, active in her hometown of Volgograd.
