= Tom (river) =

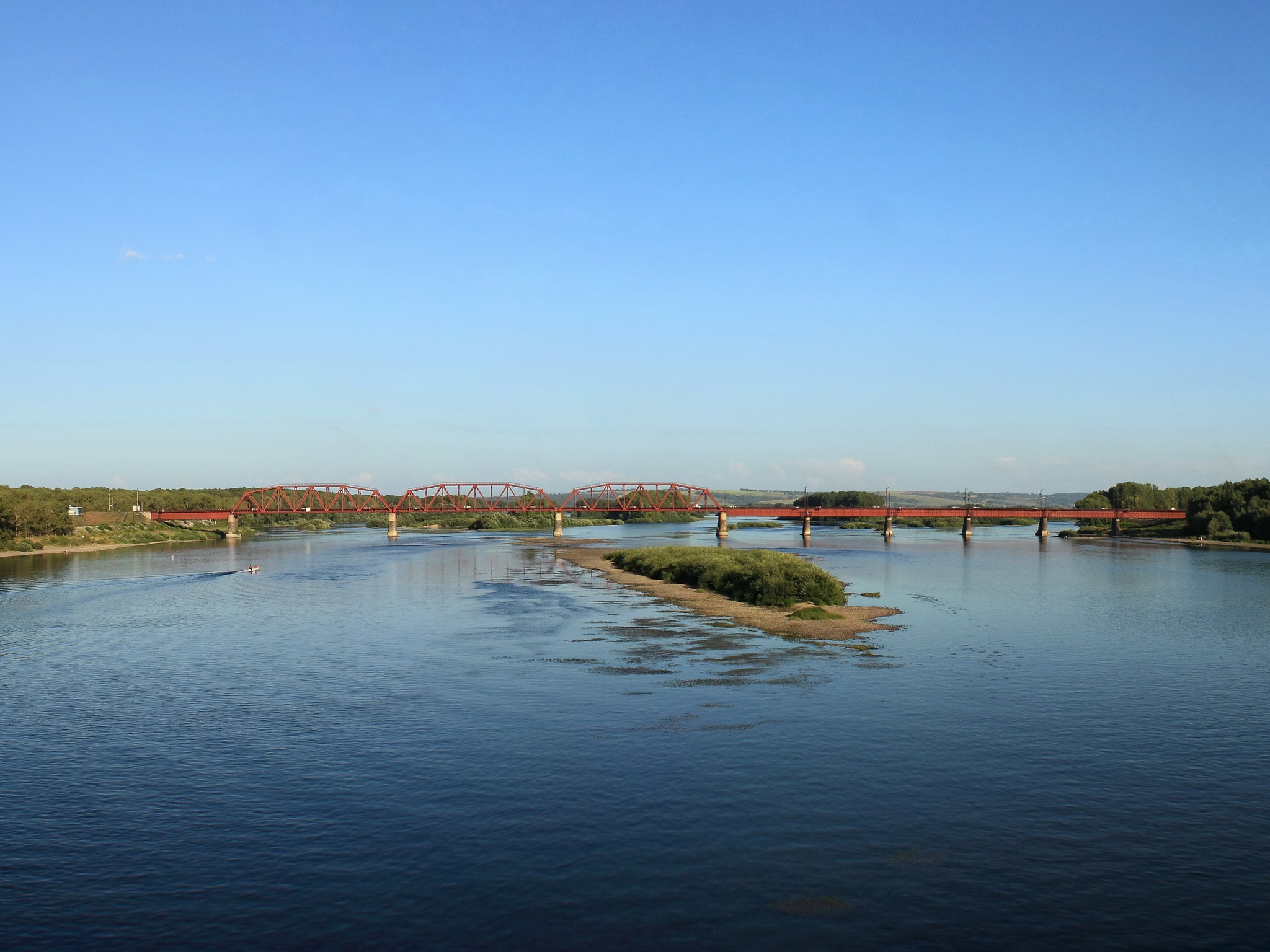
- The Tom near Novokuznetsk

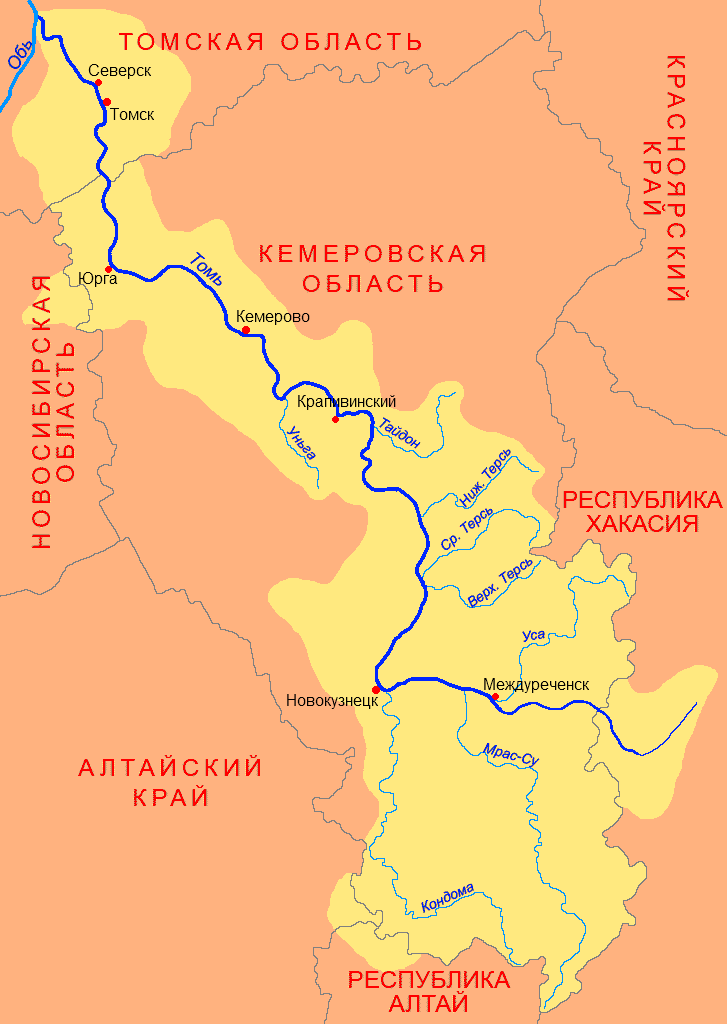
- Map of the Tom watershed
- Native name: Томь (Russian)

Location
- Country: Russia
- Region: Kemerovo Oblast, Khakassia, Tomsk Oblast
- Cities: Seversk, Tomsk, Yurga, Kemerovo, Novokuznetsk, Mezhdurechensk

Physical characteristics
- Source: Levaya Tom
  - location: Khakassia
- 2nd source: Pravaya Tom
  - location: Abakan range
- Mouth: Ob
  - location: Novosibirsk
  - coordinates: 56.8904°N 84.4568°E
- Length: 827 km (514 mi)
- Basin size: 62,000 km^{2} (24,000 sq mi)

Basin features
- Progression: Ob→ Kara Sea
- Tributaries
  - left: Mrassu, Kondoma, Aba, Chernovoy Naryk, Unga, Iskitim
  - right: Belsu, Usa, Verchnaya Ters, Srednaya Ters, Nizhnaya Ters, Taydon, Basandayka, Ushayka

The Tom (Russian: Томь, IPA: [tomʲ]; Siberian Tatar: Том; Shor: Том) is a river in Russia, a right tributary of the Ob in central Siberia. Its watershed lies within the Republic of Khakassia, Kemerovo Oblast, and Tomsk Oblast. It is 827 kilometres (514 mi) long, and has a drainage basin of 62,000 square kilometres (24,000 sq mi).

The Tom flows from the Abakan Range (a northern continuation of the Altai Mountains) northward through the Kuznetsk Basin. It joins the Ob approximately 50 kilometers (31 mi) north of Tomsk.

Cities on the Tom River include Mezhdurechensk, Novokuznetsk, Kemerovo, Yurga, Tomsk, and Seversk.

The Aba people live near the Tom River.

== Etymology ==
The name of the river may derive either from the Ket word toom ("river") or from the Russian word tyomny ("dark").

== Main tributaries ==
The largest tributaries of the Tom are, from source to mouth:

- Belsu (right)
- Usa (right)
- Mrassu (left)
- Kondoma (left)
- Aba (left)
- Verchnaya Ters (right)
- Srednaya Ters (right)
- Nizhnaya Ters (right)
- Chernovoy Naryk (left)
- Taydon (right)
- Unga (left)
- Basandayka (right)
- Iskitim (left)
- Ushayka (right)

== Gallery ==
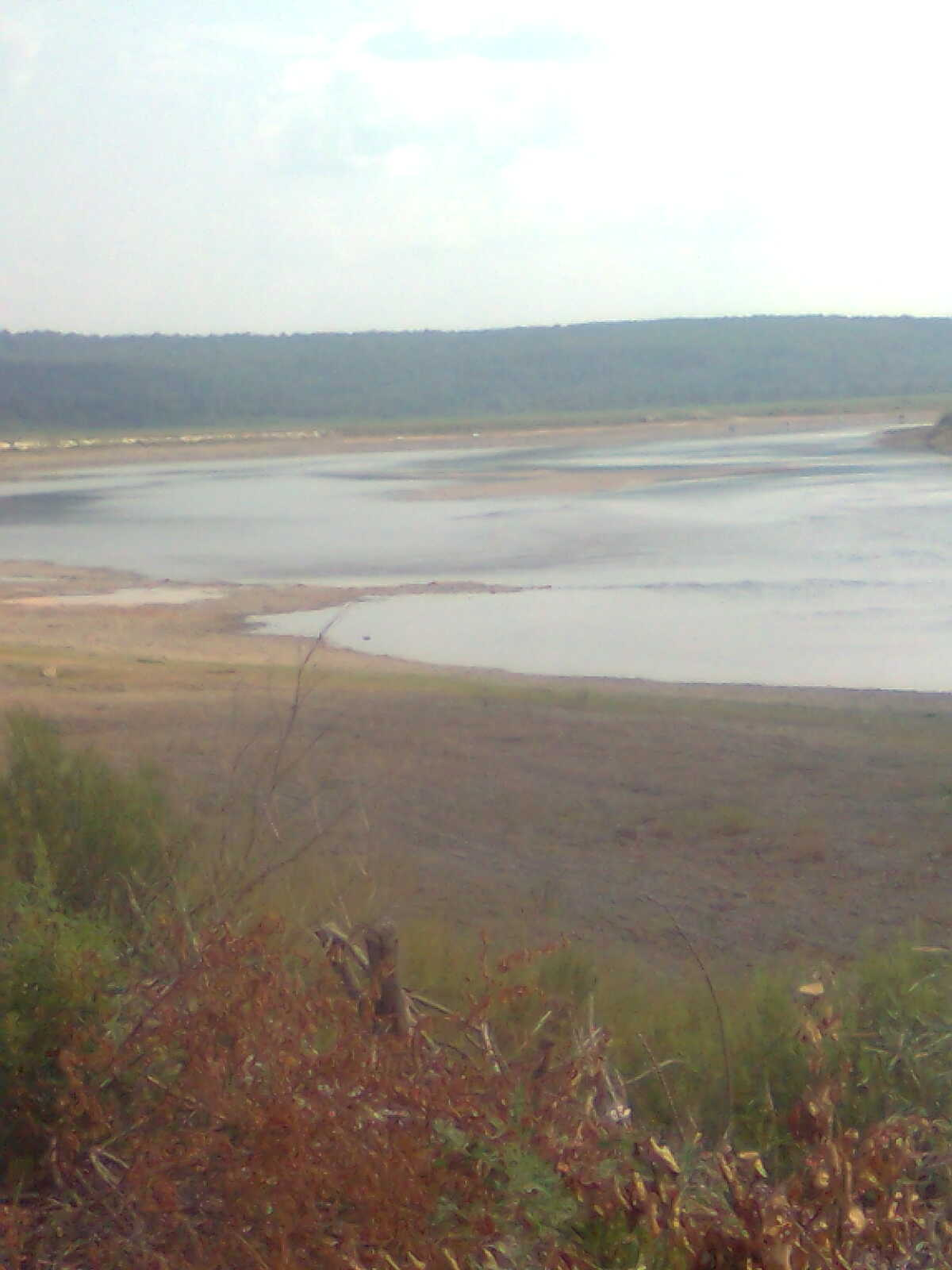
The Tom during the hot summer of 2012

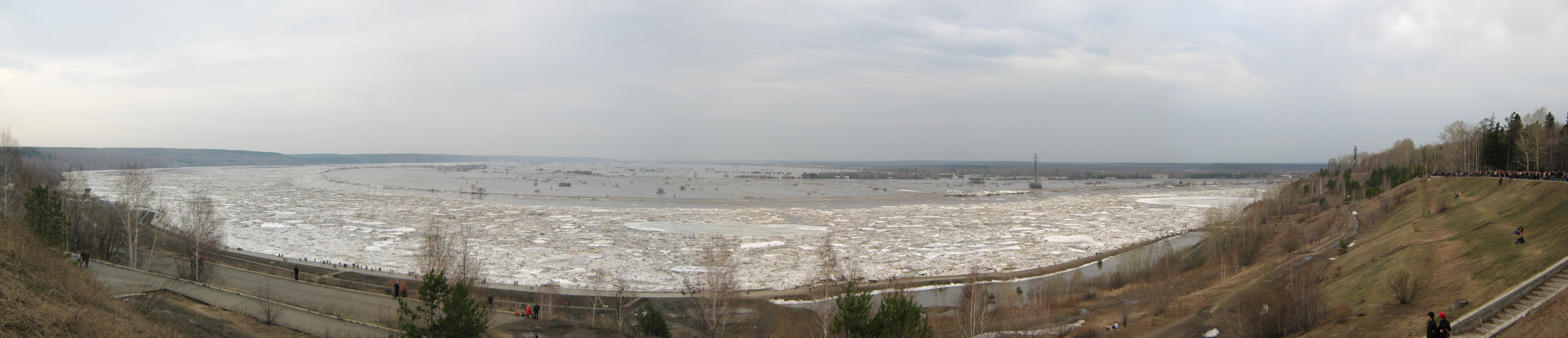
A record flooding of the Tom, April 29, 2010; caused by the floating of ice on the river in November 2009

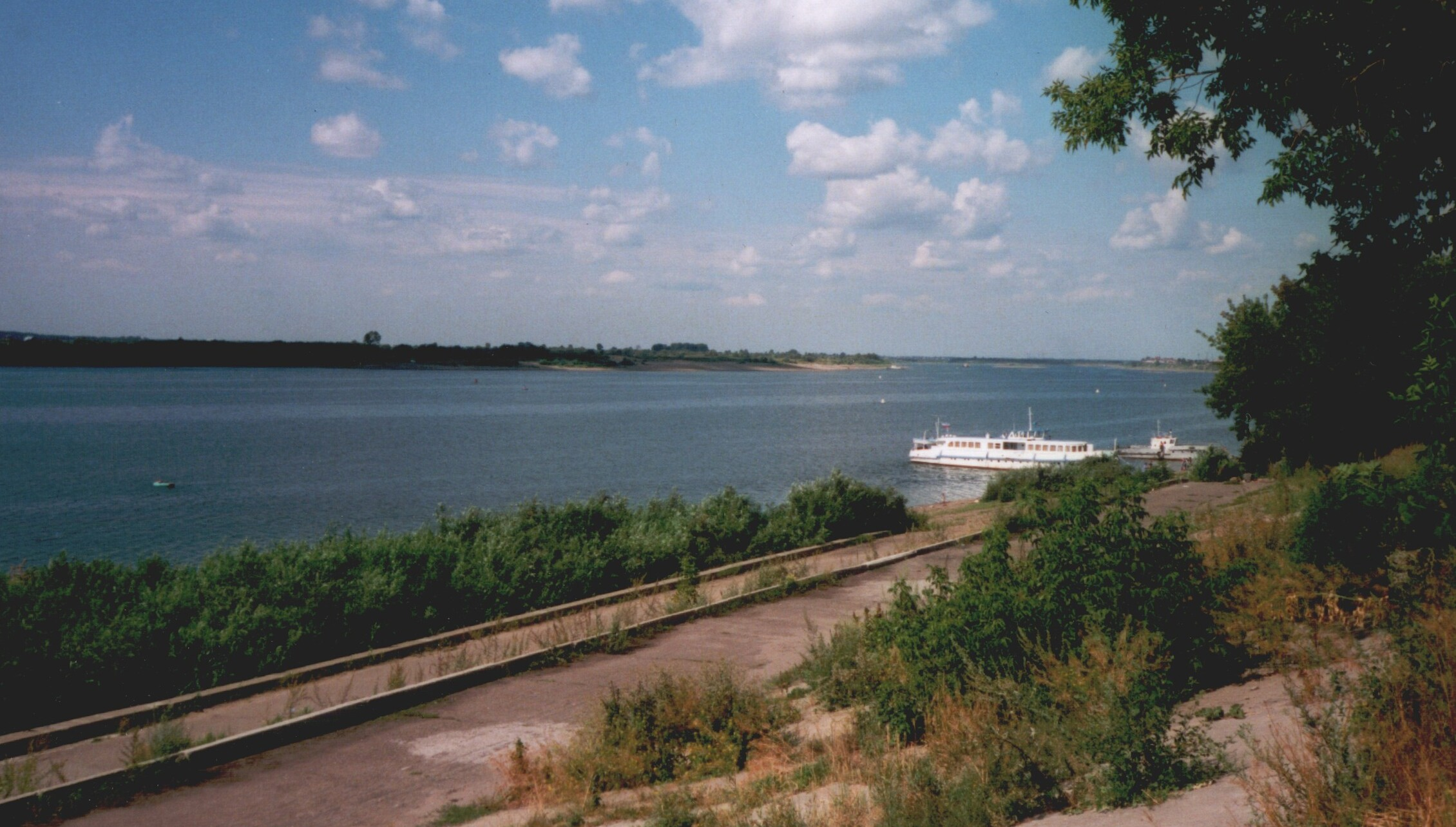
The Tom near Tomsk
