= Osinniki =

Osinniki Осинники
- Town
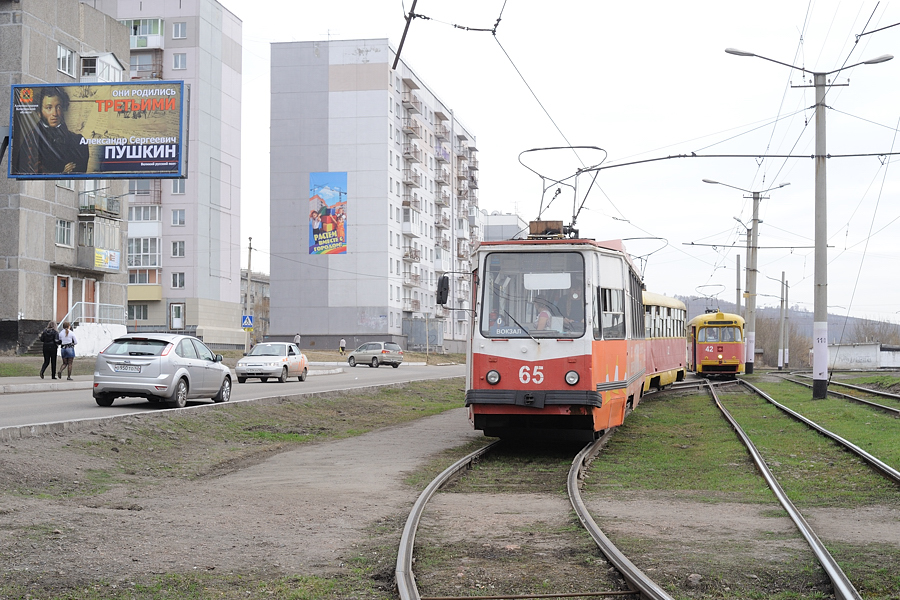
- Tram line in Osinniki

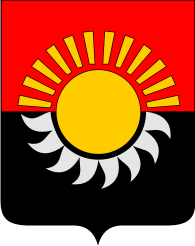
- Flag Coat of arms
- Interactive map of Osinniki
- Location of Osinniki Osinniki (Kemerovo Oblast)
- Coordinates: 53°37′N 87°20′E
- Country: Russia
- Federal subject: Kemerovo Oblast
- Founded: 1926
- Elevation: 230 m (750 ft)

Population (2010 Census)
  - Total: 46,001
  - Estimate (2025): 38,740 (−15.8%)
  - Rank: 346th in 2010

Administrative status
  - Subordinated to: Osinniki Town Under Oblast Jurisdiction
  - Capital of: Osinniki Town Under Oblast Jurisdiction

Municipal status
  - Urban okrug: Osinnikovsky Urban Okrug
  - Capital of: Osinnikovsky Urban Okrug
- Time zone: UTC+7 (MSK+4)
- Postal code: 652800
- OKTMO ID: 32734000001
- Website: www.osinniki.org

Osinniki (Russian: Оси́нники; Shor: Тағдағаал, romanized: Tağdağaal), known until 1938 as Osinovka (Russian: Оси́новка), is a town in Kemerovo Oblast, Russia. Population: 46,001 (2010 census); 51,057 (2002 census); 62,687 (1989 Soviet census).

== Administrative and municipal status ==
Within the framework of administrative divisions, it is, together with one rural locality, incorporated as Osinniki Town Under Oblast Jurisdiction—an administrative unit with the status equal to that of the districts. As a municipal division, Osinniki Town Under Oblast Jurisdiction is incorporated as Osinnikovsky Urban Okrug.
