= Shor language =

Siberian Turkic language

Shor
- Kuznets Tatar
- шор тили, şor tili тадар тили, tadar tili
- Native to: Russia
- Region: Gornaya Shoriya, Kemerovo
- Ethnicity: Shors
- Native speakers: 2,800 (2010 census)
- Language family: Turkic: Common Turkic; Siberian Turkic; South Siberian; Yenisei Turkic; Shor
- Dialects: Kondoma; Mrassu
- Writing system: Cyrillic

Language codes
- ISO 639-3: cjs
- Glottolog: shor1247 Mrassu Shor–Tutal kond1293 Kondoma Shor
- ELP: Shor
- Shor is classified as Severely Endangered by the UNESCO Atlas of the World's Languages in Danger.

Shor (endonym: шор тили, şor tili; тадар тили, tadar tili), or Kuznets Tatar, is a critically endangered Turkic language spoken by about 2,800 people in a region called Mountain Shoriya, in Kemerovo Oblast in Southwest Siberia, although the entire Shor population in this area is over 12,000 people. Presently, not all ethnic Shors speak Shor and the language suffered a decline from the late 1930s to the early 1980s. During this period the Shor language was neither written nor taught in schools. However, since the 1980s and 1990s there has been a Shor language revival. The language is now taught at the Novokuznetsk branch of the Kemerovo State University.

== Dialects ==
The two main dialects are Mrassu and Kondoma, named after the rivers in whose valleys they are spoken. From the point of view of classification of Turkic languages, these dialects belong to different branches of Turkic: According to the reflexes of the Proto-Turkic (PT) intervocalic -d- in modern languages (compare PT *adak, in modern Turkic languages meaning 'foot' or 'leg'), the Mrassu dialect is a -z- variety: azaq, the Kondoma dialect is a -y- variety: ayaq. This feature normally distinguishes different branches of Turkic which means that the Shor language has formed from different Turkic sources. Each Shor dialect has subdialectal varieties. The Upper-Mrassu and the Upper-Kondoma varieties have developed numerous close features in the course of close contacts between their speakers in the upper reaches of the Kondoma and Mrassu rivers.

== Phonology ==
=== Vowels ===
Shor vowels
Type	Front		Back	
Type	unrounded	rounded	unrounded	rounded
Close	i ⟨и⟩ iː ⟨ии⟩	y ⟨ӱ⟩ yː ⟨ӱӱ⟩	ɯ ⟨ы⟩ ɯː ⟨ыы⟩	u ⟨у⟩ uː ⟨уу⟩
Mid	e ⟨e⟩ eː ⟨ee⟩	ø ⟨ö⟩ øː ⟨öö⟩		o ⟨o⟩ oː ⟨oo⟩
Open			a ⟨a⟩ aː ⟨aa⟩	

=== Consonants ===
Shor consonants
Type		Bilabial	Dental	Palatal	Velar	
Nasal		m ⟨м⟩	n ⟨н⟩		ŋ ⟨ң⟩	
Plosive and Affricate	Plosive	voiceless	p ⟨п⟩	t ⟨т⟩	c ⟨к⟩	k ⟨қ⟩
Plosive and Affricate	Plosive	voiced	b ⟨б⟩	d ⟨д⟩	ɟ ⟨г⟩	ɡ ⟨ғ⟩
Plosive and Affricate	Affricate	voiceless			t͡ʃ ⟨ч⟩	
Plosive and Affricate	Affricate	voiced			d͡ʒ ⟨ҷ⟩	
Fricative	voiceless		s ⟨c⟩	ʃ ⟨ш⟩	x ⟨x⟩	
Fricative	voiced		z ⟨з⟩	ʒ ⟨ж⟩		
Liquid	lateral		l ⟨л⟩			
Liquid	rhotic		r ⟨p⟩			
Liquid	alveolar		r ⟨p̄⟩			
Approximant				j ⟨й⟩		

== Writing system ==
=== History ===
Before the 19th century the Shor language had remained unwritten; in the 1870s Orthodox missionaries made the first effort to create a Cyrillic Shor alphabet. In spite of all the efforts by the missionaries, the percentage of literacy among the native population increased very slowly — by the beginning of the 20th century they constituted only about 1% of the Shors.

The Shor written language had its 'golden age' in the 1920s. In 1927, a second attempt was made to create a Shor alphabet based on Cyrillic. In 1932-1933, Fedor Cispijakov wrote and published a new primer based on the Latin alphabet. This however considerably complicated the process of learning; thus in 1938, the same author together with Georgij Babuskin created a new variant of the primer based on the Cyrillic alphabet, of which several editions have been published since then.

The Mrassu dialect served as a basis for literary Shor language both in the 1930s and in the 1980s when the written form of the Shor language was revitalized after a break (of almost 50 years) in its written history. However, the Kondoma dialect norms are also largely accepted. The Academy grammar of Shor, published in 1941, was written on the basis of the Mrass dialect by Dyrenkova.

In 2005, to highlight the endangered status of the language, Gennady Kostochakov published a book of poems in Shor, entitled "I am the Last Shor Poet". In 2017, a Shor translation of Alice's Adventures in Wonderland by Liubovʹ Arbaçakova was published.

=== Missionary alphabet ===
The first book written in the Shor language was published in 1885. It used a modified Russian alphabet (excluding Ё ё, Ф ф, Щ щ, and Ѣ ѣ) with additional letters Ј ј, Ҥ ҥ, Ӧ ӧ, and Ӱ ӱ.

In 1927 an official alphabet was adopted, being the Russian alphabet (excluding Ё ё and ъ) with additional letters Ј ј, Ҥ ҥ, Ӧ ӧ, and Ӱ ӱ.

=== Latin alphabet ===
A Latin alphabet for the Shor language was introduced in 1930: A a, B в, C c, D d, Ə ə, F f, G g, Ƣ ƣ, I i, J j, K k, Q q, M m, N n, Ꞑ ꞑ, O o, Ө ө, P p, R r, S s, T t, U u, V v, Ş ş, Z z, Ƶ ƶ, L l, Ь ь, Y y, Į į.

The order of the letters was later changed to correspond with alphabets for other languages in the Soviet Union, the letter Ә ә was replaced with E e, and the letter Į į was dropped.

=== Modern alphabet ===
In 1938 the Latin alphabet was replaced with a Cyrillic one. It used the Russian alphabet with additional letters Ӧ ӧ, Ӱ ӱ, and Нъ нъ.

After reforms in 1980 it reached its present form: А а, Б б, В в, Г г, Ғ ғ, Д д, Е е, Ё ё, Ж ж, З з, И и, Й й, К к, Қ қ, Л л, М м, Н н, Ң ң, О о, Ӧ ӧ, П п, Р р, С с, Т т, У у, Ӱ ӱ, Ф ф, Х х, Ц ц, Ч ч, Ш ш, Щ щ, Ъ ъ, Ы ы, Ь ь, Э э, Ю ю, Я я.

=== Comparison of Shor alphabets ===
Cyrillic		Latin	Cyrillic		Common Turkic alphabet
1885	1927-1930	1930-1938	1938-1980	1980–present	Common Turkic alphabet
А а	A a	A a	А а	А а, [a]	A a
(Аа аа)	(Аа аа)	(Aa aa)	(Аа аа)	(Аа аа), [aː]	(Â, â)
Б б	Б б	B в	Б б	Б б, [b]	B b
В в	В в	V v	В в	В в, [v]	V v
Г г	Г г	G g	Г г	Г г, [ɟ]	G g
Г г	Г г	Ƣ ƣ	Г г	Ғ ғ, [g]	Ğ ğ
Д д	Д д	D d	Д д	Д д, [d]	D d
Е е	Е е		Е е	Е е, [je], [e]	(Ye, ye), E e
(Ее ее)	(Ее ее)	(Ee ee)	(Ее ее)	(Ее ее), [eː]	(Ê, ê)
				Ё ё, [jo]	(Yo, yo)
Ж ж	Ж ж	Ƶ ƶ	Ж ж	Ж ж, [ʒ]	J j
З з	З з	Z z	З з	З з, [z]	Z z
И и, I i, Ѵ ѵ	И и	I i, Į į	И и	И и, [i]	İ i
(Ии ии), (Ii ii), (Ѵѵ ѵѵ)	(Ии ии)	(Ii ii), (Įį įį)	(Ии ии)	(Ии ии), [iː]	(Î, î)
Й й	Й й	J j	Й й	Й й, [j]	Y y
К к	К к	K k	К к	К к, [c]	K k
К к	К к	Q q	К к	Қ қ, [k]	Q q
Л л	Л л	L l	Л л	Л л, [l]	L l
М м	М м	M m	М м	М м, [m]	M m
Н н	Н н	N n	Н н	Н н, [n]	N n
Ҥ ҥ	Ҥ ҥ	Ꞑ ꞑ	Нъ нъ	Ң ң, [ŋ]	Ñ ñ
О о	О о	О о	О о	О о, [o]	O o
(Оо оо)	(Оо оо)	(Oo oo)	(Оо оо)	(Оо оо), [oː]	(Ô ô)
Ӧ ӧ	Ө ө	Ө ө	Ӧ ӧ	Ӧ ӧ [ø]	Ö ö
(Ӧӧ ӧӧ)	(Өө өө)	(Өө өө)	(Ӧӧ ӧӧ)	(Ӧӧ ӧӧ), [øː]	(Öö öö)
П п	П п	P p	П п	П п, [p]	P p
Р р	Р р	R r	Р р	Р р, [r]	R r
С с	С с	S s	C c	C c, [s]	S s
Т т	Т т	T t	Т т	Т т, [t]	T t
У у	У у	U u	У у	У у, [u]	U u
(Уу уу)	(Уу уу)	(Uu uu)	(Уу уу)	(Уу уу), [uː]	(Û, û)
Ӱ ӱ	Ӱ ӱ	Y y	Ӱ ӱ	Ӱ ӱ, [y]	Ü ü
(Ӱӱ ӱӱ)	(Ӱӱ ӱӱ)	(Yy yy)	(Ӱӱ ӱӱ)	(Ӱӱ ӱӱ), [yː]	(Üü üü)
Ѳ ѳ	Ф ф	F f	Ф ф	Ф ф, [f]	F f
Х х	Х х	X x	Х х	Х х, [x]	X x
Ц ц	Ц ц		Ц ц	Ц ц, [t͡s]	(Ts ts)
Ч ч, J j	Ч ч	C c	Ч ч	Ч ч, [tʃ], [dʒ]	Ç ç, C c
Ш ш	Ш ш	Ş ş	Ш ш	Ш ш, [ʃ]	Ş ş
	Щ щ		Щ щ	Щ щ, [ɕː]	(Şç şç)
ъ			ъ	ъ, [.]	”
Ы ы	Ы ы	Ь ь	Ы ы	Ы ы, [ɯ]	I ı
(Ыы ыы)	(Ыы ыы)	(Ьь ьь)	(Ыы ыы)	(Ыы ыы), [ɯː]	(Iı ıı)
ь	ь		ь	ь, [ʲ]	’
Э э	Э э	Ə ə, Е е	Э э	Э э, [e]	E e
Ю ю	Ю ю		Ю ю	Ю ю, [ju]	(Yu yu)
Я я	Я я		Я я	Я я, [ja]	(Ya ya)

== Morphology and syntax ==
=== Pronouns ===
Shor has seven personal pronouns:

Personal pronouns
	Singular	Plural
1st person	мен men I	пис pis we
2nd person	сен sen you (singular)	силер/слер siler/sler you (plural, formal)
3rd person	ол ol he/she/it	ылар/лар, олор/алар ılar/lar, olor/alar they (as in "those", equivalent to Turkish "onlar")
3rd person	ол ol he/she/it	пылар/плар pılar/plar they (as in "these", equivalent to Turkish "bunlar")

== Vocabulary ==
Like other Siberian Turkic languages, Shor has borrowed many roots from Mongolian, as well as words from Russian.
