= History of metallurgy in the Urals =

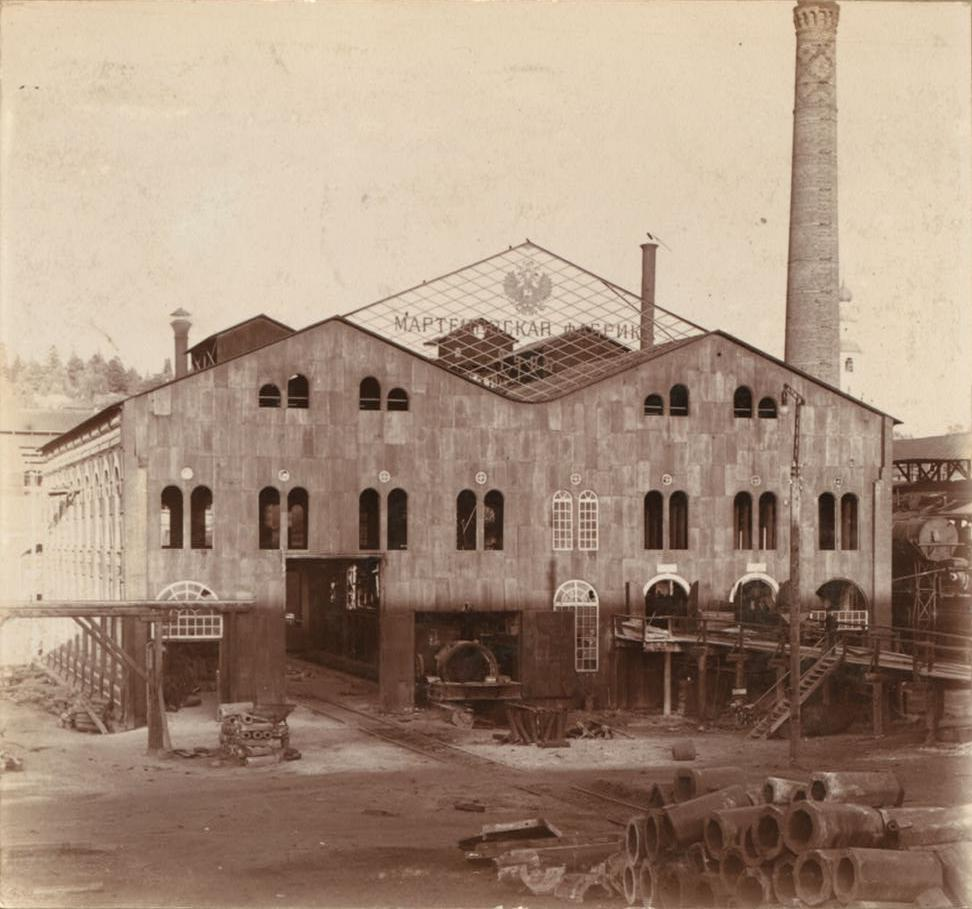
The open-hearth shop of the Kushvinsky Plant at the beginning of the 20th century.

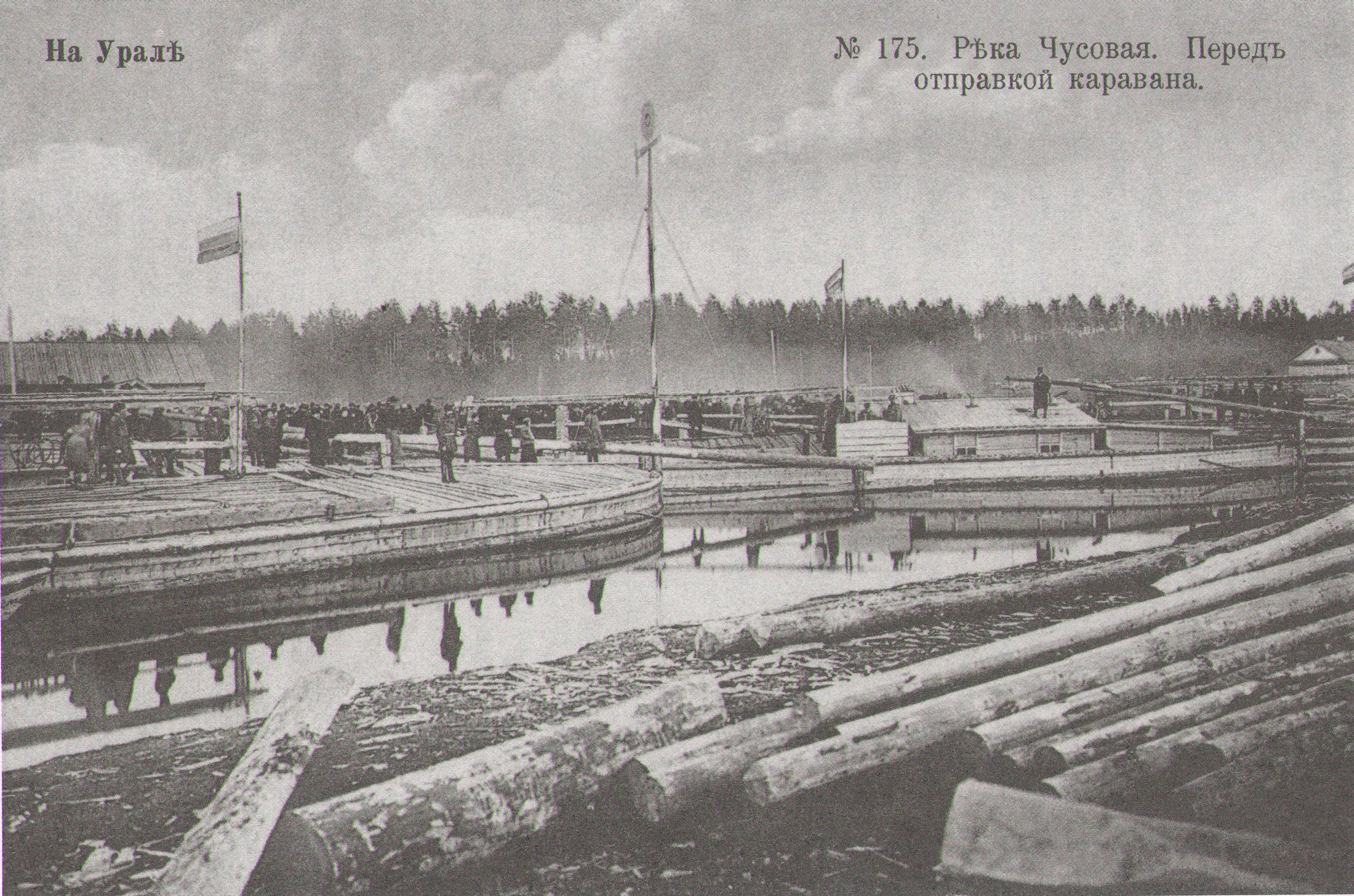
Sending a caravan along Chusovaya, 1893

The history of metallurgy in the Urals stands out to historians and economists as a separate stage in the history of Russian industry and covers the period from the 4th millennium BC to the present day. The emergence of the mining district is connected with the history of Ural metallurgy. The geography of the Ural metallurgy covers the territories of modern Perm Krai, Sverdlovsk Oblast, Udmurtia, Bashkortostan, Chelyabinsk Oblast and Orenburg Oblast.

In the 18th century, periods of formation and development of industrial metallurgical centers stand out in Urals metallurgy, for example, the rapid construction and economic growth of more than two hundred metallurgy factories during the 18th to the first half of the 19th centuries until the abolition of serfdom on February 19, 1861, in the Russian Empire, which led to reductions in the labor force. There was also a sharp drop in production rates in the early 1900s but that was followed by recovery and growth by 1913. In the 20th century, after recovering from the decline caused by the Russian Revolution(s): 1905, February 1917, and October 1917 and the Russian Civil War (November 1917 - June 1923), Ural metallurgy had a strategic impact on ensuring the defense of the USSR on the Eastern Front of World War II which is known in Russia as the Great Patriotic War. In the 21st century, the development of metallurgical enterprises in the Urals is associated with the formation of vertically integrated full cycle companies.

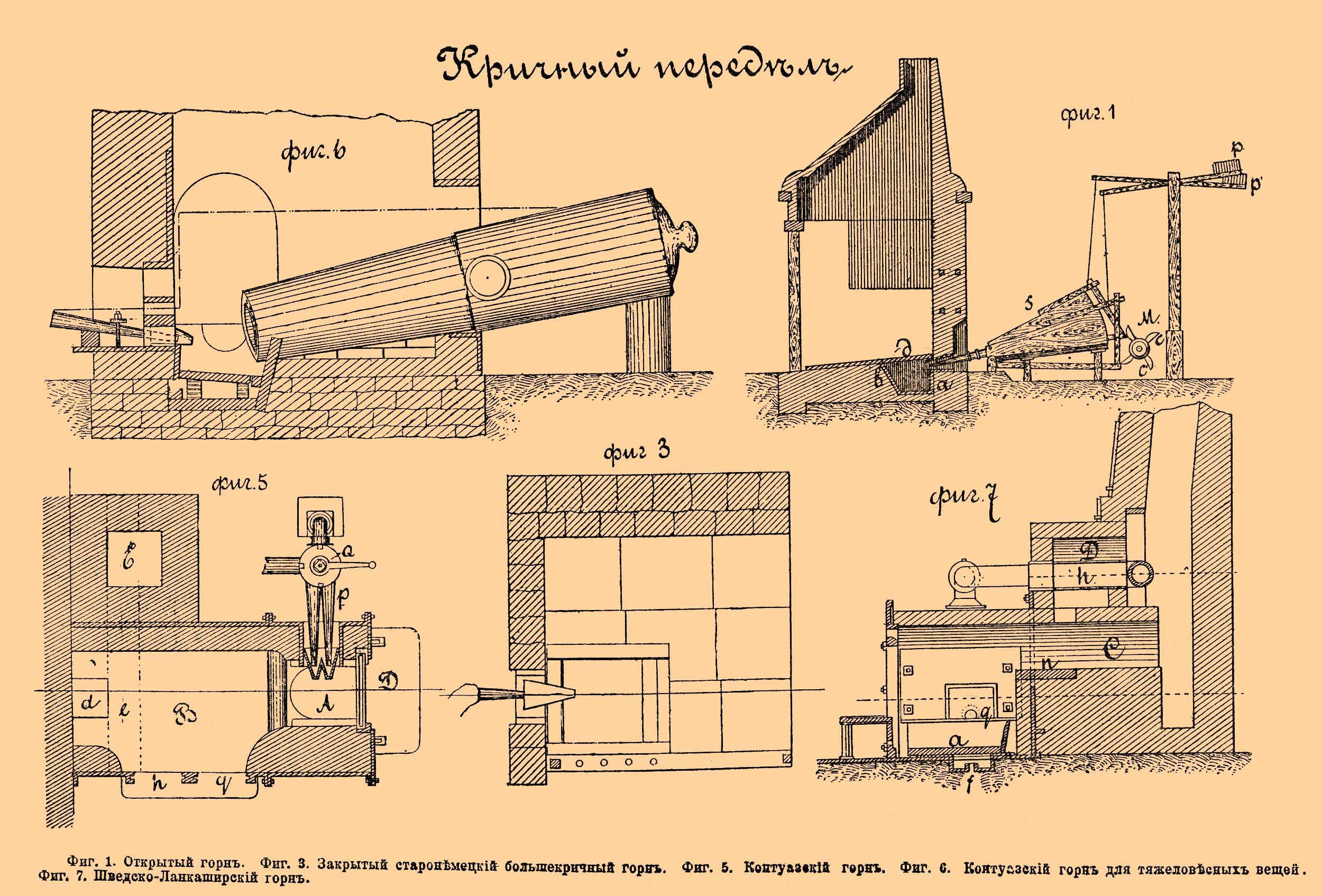
Kontuazsky forges - figures 5 & 6.

The main milestones in the development of metal production technologies in the Urals include the transition from bloomery or the old iron production method to the Kontuazsky forge (for remelting heavy scrap) and the puddling method in the second half of the 19th century. Later, there was the development of hot blast at the end of the 19th century. Further, there was a transition to coke fuel and the introduction of steam engines. Finally, there was the development of open-hearth and Bessemer methods of steel production at the beginning of the 20th century.

== Primitive metallurgy ==
The first period of metallurgical production in the Urals date back to the 4th and 3rd millennia BC. During the Bronze Age, primitive copper-bronze metallurgy was developed among the pastoral tribes of the Urals. The beginning of the development of the Kargalinsky copper ore deposit, located along the Kargalka and Yangiz Rivers, began during this period. In the first half of the third millennium BC, centers of copper metallurgy were formed in the Western Urals and in the Kama region, the ore base that provided numerous mineral deposits of copper sandstone.

The second millennium BC was characterized by the massive spread of copper-bronze metallurgy practically throughout the Urals, and the development of new technologies and metal processing. The Seima-Turbino phenomenon of the distribution of high-quality bronze products in the vast expanses of the forest-steppe zone of Eurasia belongs to this period. The centers of metallurgy of the Southern Urals of the 2nd millennium BC include settlements of the Sintashta, Abashevo and Arkaim cultures. The development of bronze metallurgy in the Urals was hindered by the lack of tin deposits, the alloying of copper which allowed to obtain high-quality bronze. (Note: It is the addition of tin to copper that makes it possible to significantly increase the strength properties of bronze and its corrosion resistance.) Therefore, the metal objects found at the excavations of the Bronze Age settlements are mainly represented by products made of ordinary copper and arsenic bronze.

During the period from the end of the 2nd millennium BC to the beginning of the 1st millennium BC, the most ore-rich areas of the southern Ural copper mines were depleted and abandoned. In the middle of the first millennium BC, metallurgical products were mastered by representatives of Srubnaya culture. In the second half of the 1st millennium BC, there were isolated pockets of Ananyino culture in the Kama-Volga region and Itkul culture in the Urals.

The appearance of iron in the Urals dates back to the 1st millennium BC. In the Kama-Volga region iron products were made from the 8th to the 6th centuries BC, and in the Ural Mountains from the fifth to the fourth centuries BC. In general, the massive penetration of primitive iron metallurgy with the use of forges in the Urals began in the middle of the 1st millennium BC. Forest tribes of the northern Urals and in the north of Western Siberia mastered iron metallurgy by the end of the 1st millennium BC. In the settlements of the Gorokhovo and Kara-Abyz cultures, along with bronze, iron products were found to be in use.

The 1st millennium AD was characterized by the massive distribution of iron in the Urals and Western Siberia. The oldest blast furnace in the Urals, belonging to the Pyanoborsk culture, was discovered by Vladimir Gening at the settlement of Cheganda I, on the territory of modern Udmurtia. Also, for the settlements of the Upper Kama region at the beginning of the Iron Age, the separation of metallurgical production into a separate craft was characteristic, which made up the specialization of entire villages or parts of them. The spread of iron crafts was facilitated by the resettlement of the Ugric tribes of the Petrogrom culture in the Urals. Remains of iron-smelting furnaces of the 6th-9th centuries were found during excavations of hill forts near modern Yekaterinburg.

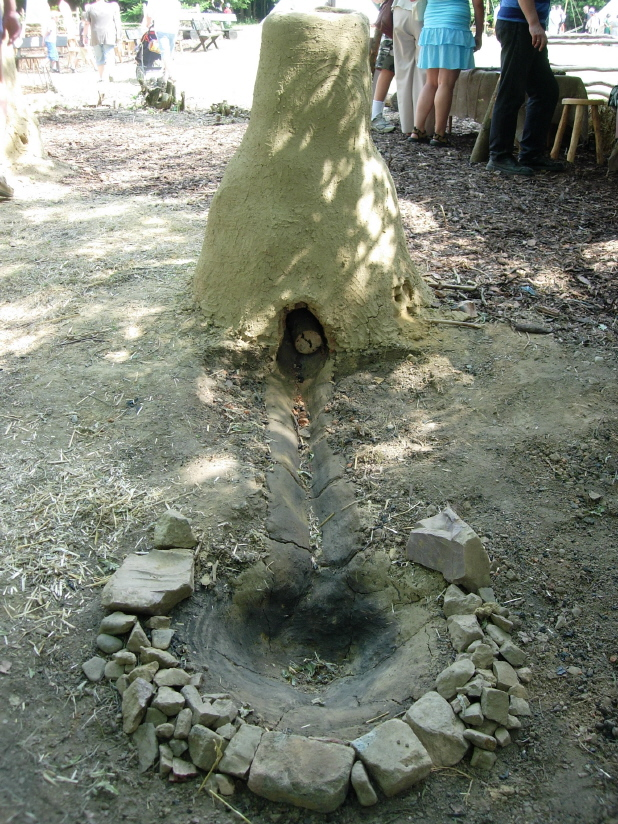
Reconstruction of a furnace

In the 11th to the 13th centuries, metal goods made by Western European artisans began to penetrate the Urals through trade routes, which contributed to the expansion of the range of products smelted. Excavations at the Kama settlements or hill forts of Idnakar, Vasyakar, Dondykar, Kushmansky, and others have shown that in the 11th to the 15th centuries the main unit for smelting iron (Note: Ancient iron and iron of the Middle Ages (before the development of steelmaking processes) was not pure iron, but a mixture of iron with ore oxides, unburned coal, and slag inclusions. Later, such a mixture with a lower carbon content (in comparison with cast iron) became known as raw or bloomery iron.) was a blast furnace. The metalworking complexes consisted of forges and tool kits. The development of heat treatment and welding of metals proceeded unevenly throughout the Urals. In the 1st millennium, the main products of metallurgists were items for military and hunting purposes: arrowheads, spears, axes, knives, and fishhooks. From the beginning of the second millennium, agricultural implements began to predominate.

By the end of the 1st millennium, ore mining and its own copper-bronze and iron production in the Urals gradually ceased due to the depletion of available resources, competition with more developed cultures, and ethnographic changes that had begun. The penetration of Russians into the Urals, associated mainly with the abundance of furs in the region, facilitated the infiltration of new technologies, including metallurgical ones. In the 17th to the 18th centuries, abandoned ancient mines served as a kind of indicator for geologists in search of ore. With the help of such finds, the Gumeshev and Kargalin deposits of copper ores, the deposits of the Verkh-Isetsky (Upper Iset) and Kyshtym mining districts, as well as the Mednorudyansk deposit were discovered.

== The 14th to the 16th centuries ==
During the period of active colonization of the Urals, which began in the 14th to early 15th centuries, there were rumors about subsurface deposits in Perm land and Yugra. But when conditions were dangerous for the settlers, because of the indigenous population, industrial land development was practically not carried out. In 1491, Ivan III sent an expedition to the Northern Urals, to Pechora, with the task of searching for silver and copper ores. As a result, a small silver ore deposit was discovered on the Tsilma River, which was quickly developed. Ivan IV declared the prospecting and mining of ores a state monopoly and in 1567-1568 he sent an expedition to search for silver and copper ores on the Yayva River. The expedition ended in vain. In 1568, Ivan IV allocated extensive lands to Y. A. Stroganov in the Kama region with permission to use iron ores, but was banned from using silver, copper and tin ores, and he had to immediately report their discovery to Moscow.

The active resettlement of Russians to the Urals was facilitated by the agrarian crisis of the agricultural central part of Russia at the end of the 16th century. From 1579 to 1678 the Russian population of Great Perm increased from 2,197 to 11,811 households (by 463%). By 1724, the population of the Urals was already about 1 million people, while the total population of Russia was about 14 million people.

Until the beginning of the 17th century, all of the Ural and Russian metallurgy was locally handcrafted production in the form of small peasant blast furnaces and forges, in which all the processes of obtaining finished products were concentrated.

== The 17th to the 19th century ==
=== The 17th century ===
Beginning in 1618, the government on an almost continual basis organized expeditions to the Urals and Siberia to search for ore deposits. Also, the practice of issuing permits was used, which made it possible to search for ores throughout the territory of the state.

In the 16th-17th centuries, primitive blast furnaces were built by peasant families in the forests adjacent to their villages. The resulting metal pieces were processed into iron in forges or sold. It is known that 40 years before the arrival of Georg Wilhelm de Gennin to the Urals, the peasants of the Aramil settlement smelted iron in small furnaces and sold it, paying tithes to the district office. Even at the beginning of the 18th century, the smelting of ore in small blast furnaces (Note: This system made a semi-finished product of iron production.) was widespread in many regions of the Urals. In 1720–1722, the artisanal farms of the Kungur district produced 3 thousand poods of iron, 203 poods of strip iron and 897 poods of other varieties. Subsequently, artisanal metallurgical production was legally prohibited on the initiative of G. W. de Gennin.

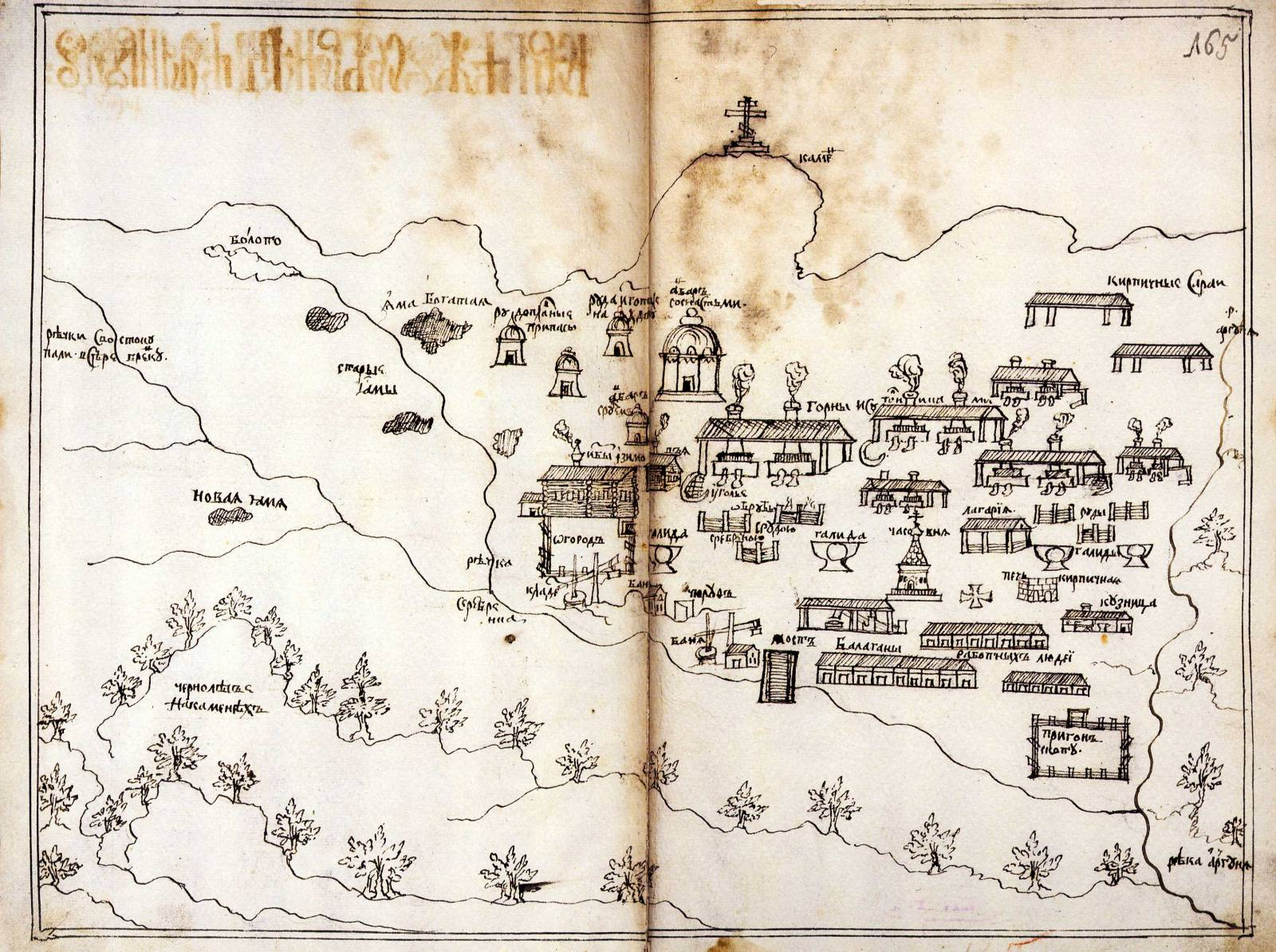
Plan of the Nerchinsk Silver Smelting Plant

In the 1630s, with the involvement of foreign engineers, the construction of arms metallurgical factories began in the central part of Russia. Despite the construction of more than 20 state and private factories in the central region in the 17th century, the country experienced a shortage of metal and continued to buy it abroad. In 1629, 25 thousand poods of iron bars were bought in Sweden. To meet the needs of the Ural and Siberian enterprises (primarily salt-making) and settlements settled by Russians, iron was purchased in the central regions. At the same time, the cost of the metal increased sharply with the distance to the east due to transport costs. The impetus for the development of the Ural industry at the beginning of the 17th century was the plans of the authorities to create metallurgical enterprises in the eastern regions of Russia. After his trip abroad, Peter I, realizing the shortage of coal in the central regions and the need to strengthen weapons potential, ordered the construction of mining plants in the Urals, providing them with engineers from Tula, Kashira and other factories. The Ural factories were built on the model of factories in central Russia, which, in turn, were created using the French, German and Swedish types. The rapid development of the metallurgical industry in the Urals in the 17th-18th centuries was facilitated by the abundance of rich natural alloyed (copper, chromium and vanadium) ores in the region, as well as the availability of accessible forest and water resources. The lack of railways led to the development of a large number of small mines. Iron ore reserves were considered practically inexhaustible, while copper ore reserves, on the contrary, were quickly depleted, which led to the closure of 40 copper smelters in the Western Urals in the late 17th - first half of the 18th century.

In the absence of their own specialists in mining and metallurgy, craftsmen were invited from abroad, but they worked mainly in the central regions of the country. In 1618–1622, the Englishman John Water, and in 1626 Fritsch, Gerold and Bulmerr, together with Russian attendants, carried out fruitless expeditions to search for ores in the region of the upper Kama and the Pechora. Others such as the Bergman brothers also unsuccessfully searched for ore in 1626 in the Cherdyn region. Only in 1635, the Saxon, Aris Petzold, and the Moscow merchant Nadia Sveteshnikov found two copper deposits, which became the basis of the first copper smelter in the Urals - Pyskorsky. Failures of geological exploration expeditions at the beginning of the 17th century forced the state to weaken its monopoly on exploration for non-ferrous and precious metals. Major rewards were promised for the found deposits. This decision was followed by a series of discoveries of new deposits of copper and iron in the Urals. In particular, thanks to local residents who brought samples of bog ore to the offices of the Turin and Tobolsk governors for a fee, the deposits of the first iron-making plant in the Urals - Nitsynsky - were discovered. In the 1670s, the expeditions, not finding ore in the Penza district, began to advance to the Urals and found silver ores along the banks of the Kama, Yayva and Kosva.

Government incentives for the found ores led to a sharp increase in exploration activity in the Urals. In the second half of the 17th century, the focus of the search shifted from the Kama region to the Verkhotursky district, where a number of large copper and iron deposits were discovered. In 1669–1674, the state organized an expedition to the Trans-Urals to search for silver and gold ores. During the expedition, no suitable ore was found. Rich ores were found only at the end of the 17th century far beyond the Urals, in the valley of the Argun River, on the basis of which, in 1704, the first Russian silver-smelting Nerchinsk plant was launched.

In general, the Ural metallurgy in the 17th century did not go beyond the limits of artisanal production, the central regions received greater development during this period.

=== Mining factories ===
Map of metallurgical plants of the Urals. (Note: The map is based on the materials of V. P. Semenov-Tyan-Shansky, I. N. Syrnev and others.)

With the appearance of the first factories in the Urals and the establishment of production and economic relations between the authorities and the owners, pronounced features of a subsistence economy appeared: everything necessary to ensure production was prepared and carried out at the factories on their own. Mining factories (Note: To describe mining plants, the term "factory towns" is also widely used, the authorship of which is attributed to A.V. Lunacharsky.) had their own landholdings, mines, quarries, forestry, stable yards, hayfields, marinas, courts, mills, and various auxiliary workshops. Such industrial and economic complexes were called mining districts and were legally described in the Mountain Regulations of 1806. The first mining plants of the Urals were fortified settlements with defensive structures to protect them from the raids of the Bashkirs.

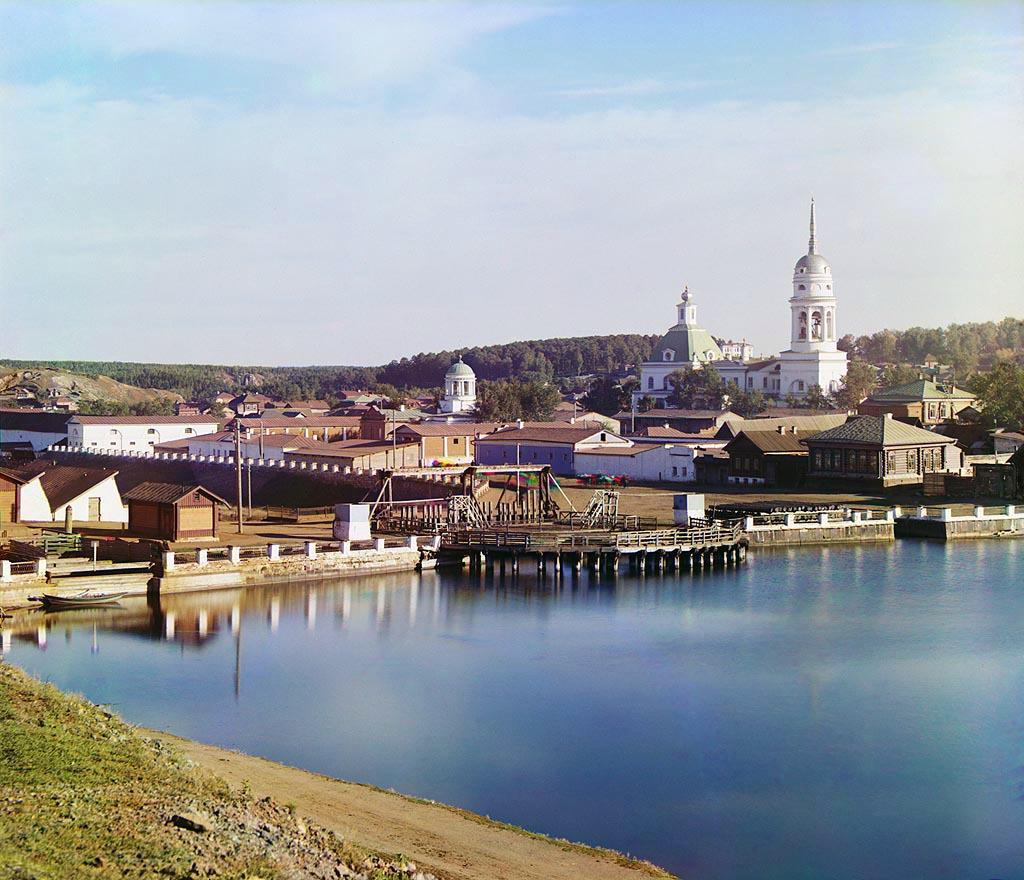
Kamensky plant, 1909

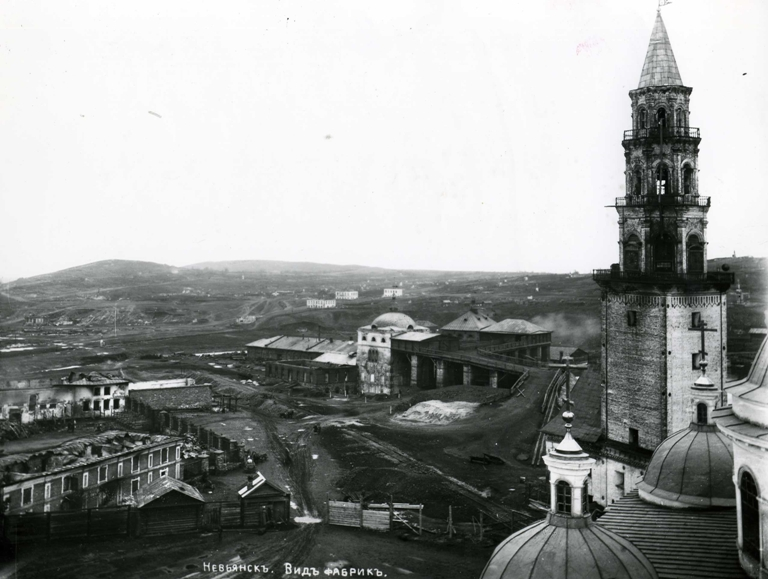
Nevyansky plant, early 20th century.

In total, about 250-260 mining plants of various specializations were built in the Urals and the Kama region: iron foundries, copper smelting, iron-making and processing plants. In total, there were about 500 mining plants in Russia. (Note: Subsequently, some factory settlements temporarily or permanently retained the word "plant" in their name: Izhevsk Plant, Saraninsky Plant, Utkinsky Plant, etc. About 80% of the plants got their names from the names of the rivers on which they were located.) The first Ural ironworks of the 17th century did not have blast furnaces and were small forges of several smelting furnaces. Such factories include Nitsynsky (founded in 1630), Krasnoborsky (1640), Tumashevsky (1669), Dalmatovsky Monastery Zhelezenskoye settlement (1683, the Kamensky iron foundry was founded on the site of the plant) and the plant in Aramashevskaya Sloboda (1654). The first full-fledged mining plants in the Urals were the Nevyansky and Kamensky plants, founded in 1699-1700 and equipped with blast furnaces, the last mining plant was Ivano-Pavlovsky, launched in 1875. Later, metallurgical plants and mills were already under construction. Actually, the beginning of the history of the mining industry in the Urals is considered to be January 1697, when Governor D. M. Protasyev reported to Moscow about the discovery of iron ore on the Tagil and Neyva rivers. The iron obtained from this ore was studied by Moscow gunsmiths and the Tula blacksmith N. D. Antufiev (Demidov) and was given a high appraisal. On May 10 and June 15, 1697, decrees were issued for the construction of the first Ural factories. And the date of birth of Ural metallurgy is considered to be 1701 when blast-furnace plants were launched and produced the first cast iron.

A specific feature of the Ural mining plants was the obligatory presence of a dam and a pond, which ensured the operation of factory mechanisms through water wheels. Therefore, mining plants were built in close proximity to ore deposits and the river. In a drought, when the water level in the navigable river decreased, the passage of ships was ensured by the synchronous discharge of water from several factory ponds located on the tributaries. The supply of charcoal was provided by the vast forest dachas assigned to the factories. The length of the dams of large factories reached 200–300 m and more (the largest dam of the Byngovsky plant was 695 m long), the width was 30–40 m, and the height was 6–10 m. Due to the climatic conditions of the Urals, it was necessary to maintain a large volume of water in the pond in order to avoid it freezing in the winter. The complete dependence of factories on the availability of water in the ponds led to frequent shutdowns of enterprises or their individual shops for a period of up to 200 days a year. To increase the water pressure, various methods were used: connecting ponds through channels with lakes or other ponds, replenishing ponds from high-mountain reservoirs through gutters. Another difference from European dams was the presence of pine or larch log cabins with valves to regulate the water level in the pond. A wide (up to 10 m and more) slot or "Veshnyak" (Note: The name comes from the spring waters formed as a result of snowmelt in the spring.) served to let in excess water during spring floods or in summer after heavy rains. A narrower (about 2 m wide) working slot was intended to supply water to a water conduit - a wooden trough, which was laid along the entire length of the plant's territory and through which water was supplied by a system of wooden pipes and gutters to the impellers of numerous plant mechanisms. The dams of large factories had several slots. All production buildings were located along the working slots. At the same time, industries that required more energy to drive mechanisms were located closer to the dam. Directly behind the dam there was usually a blast-furnace shop, behind it - blast factories, further along the trough there were drilling, stacking, steel, armature and auxiliary factories. The blast furnace was connected to the dam by a bridge across which ore, coal and fluxes were delivered. Almost all the Ural mining plants of the 18th century had two blast furnaces in their composition; in the future, the number of furnaces could increase. Pig iron, as a rule, was sent to a blast factory, where it was processed into blast iron and pounded with hammers. At large factories, the number of hammers reached 8–13.

As a rule, the factory office, the manor house, the houses of the employees of the plant administration, and the church were located on the square in front of the plant. Subsequently, with the expansion of factories, such a layout became environmental stress on factory settlements, which gradually grew into cities. Factory ponds, where industrial waste was dumped, were at the same time a source of drinking water, which contributed to the spread of all kinds of illnesses. The plants located close to each other were eventually united by one settlement: Verkh-Neyvinsky and Nizhny-Verkhneyvinsky plants in Verkh-Neyvinsky, Yekaterinburg and Verkh-Isetsky plants in Yekaterinburg, and others.

The management of state-owned factories was carried out on the military settlements model. Mining superiors, who received the title of generals, were appointed by the authorities. The plant was provided with a military garrison, which partly supported the convoy with products. The work was led by mining officers and craftsmen, who were replaced on average every five years. In 1834, state-owned factories were legally equated with military organizations and their workers with soldiers. The management of private factories was carried out by the factory owners under the supervision of the state. The presence of one owner of factories in different regions contributed to the exchange of experience and technologies between enterprises.

In literature, over time, the term "mining district" became more widely used meaning a historically established complex of enterprises with lands and forests belonging to it, pits, mines, and a mining population living on its territory. Since the beginning of the 20th century, the term "mining plant" is practically not used. (Note: In the local lore literature, there are various non-academic concepts describing the cultural and historical features of the Ural mining and metallurgical industry of the 17th-19th centuries: P. S. Bogoslovsky introduces the term "Mining civilization," A.V. Ivanov in the book "The Backbone of Russia" brings the concept of an "Ural matrix.")

=== The 18th century ===
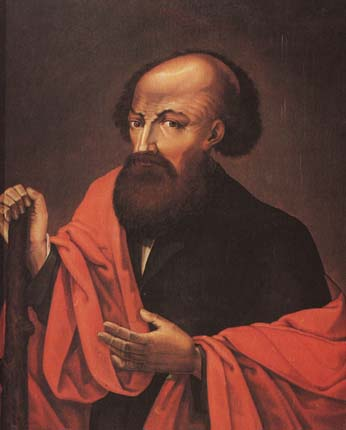
Nikita Demidov (1656–1725)

At the turn of the 17th-18th centuries, the country's need for metal was exacerbated by the outbreak of wars for access to the Black and Baltic Seas. Olonets and Kashiro-Tula plants in the central and northwestern parts of Russia had already depleted forest and ore bases and did not meet the growing demand for weapons-grade metal, and could not produce high-quality metal due to the presence of harmful impurities in the ores, primarily sulfur and phosphorus. (Note: In the vast majority of cases, sulfur and phosphorus impurities have a negative effect on the properties of steel.) These same prerequisites contributed to the shift of priority from the smelting of non-ferrous and noble metals towards iron. After the defeat of the Russian troops at Narva on November 19, 1700, the Swedes were left with all the Russian artillery, which exacerbated the need for accelerated production of guns. To make up for these losses, Peter I gave the order to melt the church bells into cannons and mortars. As a result, 300 cannons were cast in one year.

In 1696, at the initiative of the head of the Siberian order, the Duma clerk A.A. Vinius, the ore found in the Verkhotursky district was sent for examination to the Moscow gunsmiths and the Tula blacksmith N. D. Antufiev (Demidov). The samples were highly appraised, which played a decisive role in government decision-making. On May 10 and June 15, 1697, decrees of Peter I were issued on the construction of the first Ural blast furnace plants. The construction was supervised by the Siberian Order headed by A. A. Vinius. The first craftsmen arrived in the Urals to build the Nevyansk and Kamensk factories in the spring of 1700. By 1717, out of 516 workers at the Nevyansk plant, 118 people came from central Russia, including 52 from Tula, and 66 people from Moscow and the Moscow region. The launch of the first two plants in 1701 showed good prospects for Ural metallurgy. In 1702, the Uktussky, Verkhne- and Nizhne-Alapaevsky plants were launched, supplying metal, including for the construction of buildings in St. Petersburg.

On March 4, 1702, by the decree of Peter I, the unfinished Nevyansk plant was transferred to the private property of N. D. Demidov. He proved to be a talented organizer and was able to significantly increase production volumes, with the support of the authorities. Demidov easily achieved the registration of additional peasants to factories, as well as relaxation in taxes and supervision by local administrations. Since 1716, the Demidovs became the first Russian exporters of iron to Western Europe. In total, the Demidovs built 55 metallurgical plants, including 40 in the Urals. By 1740, the Demidov factories produced about 64% of all Ural and 46% of Russian iron. At the same time, the productivity of the Demidovs' factories was on average 70% higher than that of state-owned.

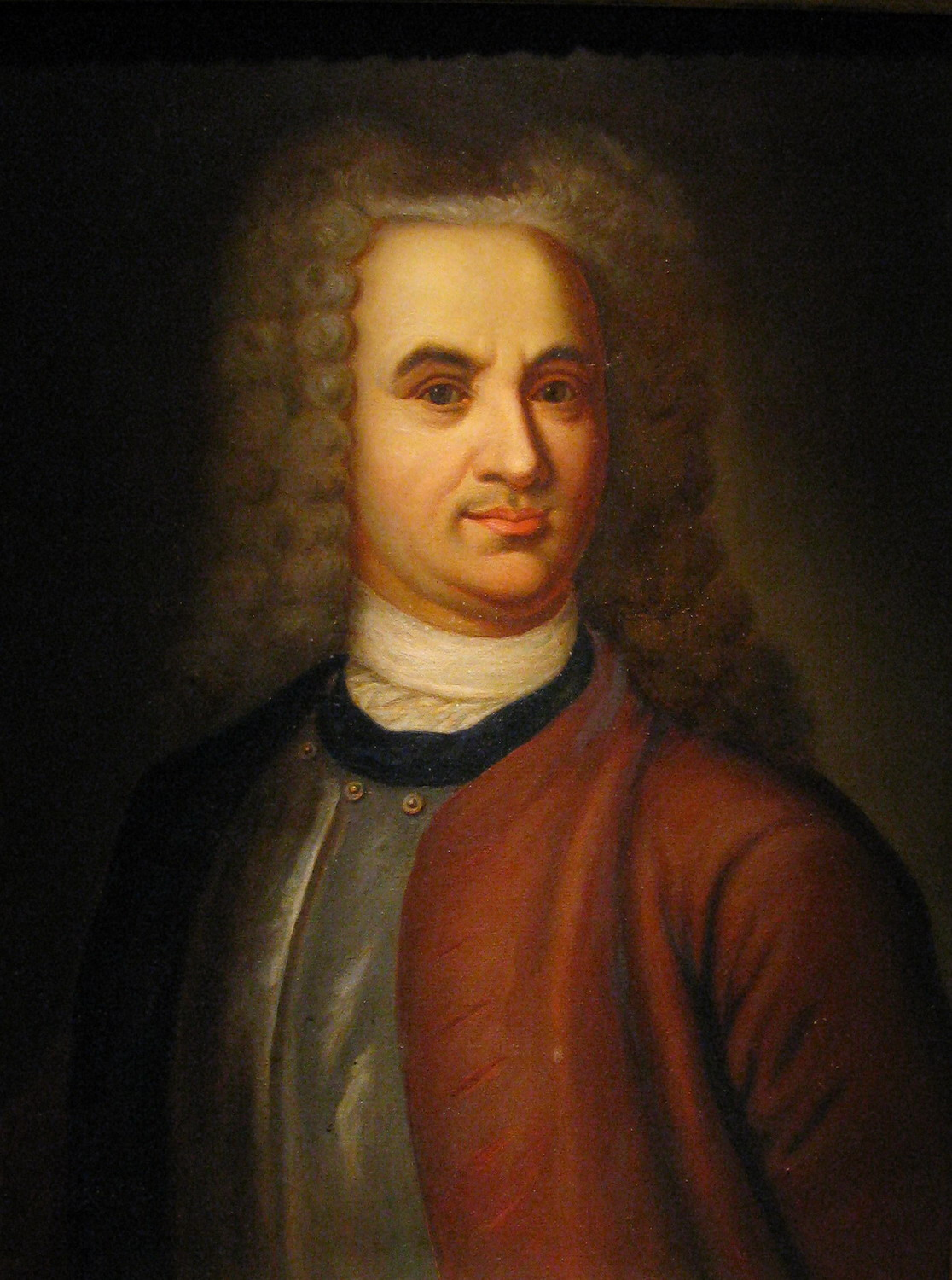
Cofounder of Yekaterinburg: V. N. Tatishev, (1686–1750).

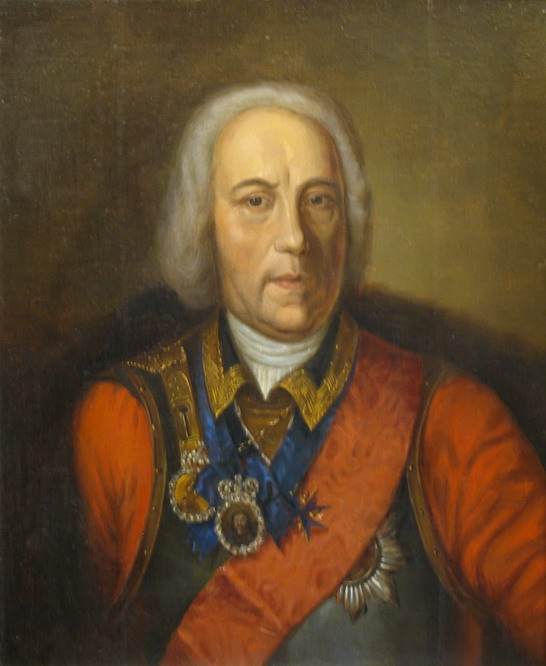
Cofounder of Yekaterinburg: V. de Gennin, (1665–1750).

In April 1703, the first convoy with guns and iron made in the Urals (323 cannons, 12 mortars, 14 howitzers) was sent from the Utkinskaya pier on the Chusovaya River. From the factories, the guns were transported by horse-drawn transport 176 versts to Chusovaya, then they were delivered by water to Moscow or St. Petersburg, wintering in Tver. The first convoy arrived in Moscow in 11 weeks and 6 days, on July 18, 1703. Tests of the first guns, which had been cast in a hurry, were unsuccessful: of the first two guns, one was torn into 20 parts due to the poor quality of the cast iron. Later, in the course of mass testing of the guns, 102 guns out of 323 were torn apart. After that, A. A. Vinius ordered the guns to be tested at the factories before shipment. Later, due to the unsatisfactory quality of the metal and high transportation costs, the manufacture of cannons was moved to the factories of the Central part of Russia. By a decree on 19 January 1705, the smelting of cannons at the Ural factories was terminated.

In the first years of the 18th century, with the launch of the first state-owned and private factories, the production base of mining districts and the management system of the enterprises included in them began to be built. Almost all of the first Ural factories were built by local peasants, who were then assigned to factories. In 1700, the first registration of more than 1.6 thousand peasants to the Nevyansk plant was carried out. In 1703, an additional postscript was made to the same plant, which was already owned by N. D. Demidov. By 1762, about 70% of state peasants were assigned to factories in the Middle Urals and Kamsky Urals. The registered peasants at the factories performed mainly auxiliary work: they prepared firewood for the production of coal and heating houses, mined and fired ore and limestone, transported goods, and erected dams. On December 10, 1719, the privileges of miners were enshrined in law with the Berg Privilege, which allowed representatives of all classes to search for ores and build metallurgical plants. At the same time, manufacturers and artisans were exempted from state taxes and recruiting, and their houses were exempt from the post of troops. The law also guaranteed the inheritance of the ownership of factories, proclaimed industrial activity a matter of state importance and protected manufacturers from interference in their affairs by local authorities. The same law established the Berg Board, and managed the entire mining and metallurgical industry, and local administrations. The provisions of the Berg Privilege were extended to foreign nationals in 1720, and remained in force until the early 19th century.

In the 1720s, V.N. Tatishchev and, later, V. de Gennin, who founded the Yekaterinburg state-owned plant in 1723, were sent to the Urals as leaders of the local mining administration. Tatishchev came into conflict with Demidov, trying to weaken his power at the beginning of his work in the Urals. Demidov complained of infringement in Petersburg, and Tatishchev was recalled. Later, de Gennin, who came to replace Tatishchev, and completed the construction of the plant in 1722–1723, confirmed the abuse of the Demidovs in organizing the work of private plants. In 1720, Tatishchev established the Office of Mining Affairs in Kungur, and in 1722 transferred it to the Uktussky plant and renamed it the Siberian Mining Authority, and then the Siberian Higher Mining Authority. De Gennin transferred the Office to Yekaterinburg in 1723 and renamed the institution the Siberian Ober-Bergamt. The achievements of Tatishchev include creating competition for the Demidovs by inviting other mining companies to the Urals, developing rules for managing mining plants and staffing standards.

Construction of mining plants in the Urals in the 18th century
| Years | State-owned | Private |
|---|---|---|
| 1701—1710 | 5 | 1 |
| 1711—1720 | 2 | 5 |
| 1721—1730 | 9 | 11 |
| 1731—1740 | 9 | 13 |
| 1741—1750 | 1 | 18 |
| 1751—1760 | 1 | 36 |
| 1761—1770 | 1 | 25 |
| 1771—1780 | — | 15 |
| 1781—1790 | — | 13 |
| 1791—1800 | 1 | 5 |

In the 1720s and 1740s, the Yekaterinburg plant, which gave rise to Yekaterinburg, was the largest metallurgical plant in Europe. The blast furnaces of the plant were more economical and more productive than the English and Swedish ones, which were considered the best in the industry at that time. If the specific consumption of charcoal per 100 kg of iron in Swedish furnaces ranged from 300 to 350 kg, then in Yekaterinburg the consumption of coal was 150–170 kg.

On January 18, 1721, a decree was issued that allowed factory owners, regardless of whether they had a noble rank, to buy serfs. At the same time, the villages purchased by the tycoon with their population could only be sold together with the factory. Later, these peasants and the factories that used their labor became known as possessory factories. Later, in 1744, the norms for the purchase of peasants with factories were established: in the factories of ferrous metallurgy with one blast furnace — 100 peasants, and in the copper smelters - 200 men for every thousand pounds of copper. The addition of peasants to factories led to unrest and riots, which were suppressed during the 2nd half of the 18th century. Later, until the middle of the 19th century, free labor contributed to the intensive development of the metallurgical industry.

In the first quarter of the 18th century, 20 (Note: According to other data, 23 furnaces were built.) blast furnaces were built in the Urals, and in 1725 they smelted about 0.6 million poods of cast iron. During the same period, small businesses built several small metallurgical plants: Mazuevsky, Shuvakishsky, and Davydovsky. All of them existed for no more than 40 years. After the end of the Northern War, due to a decrease in demand for ferrous metals, the construction of iron smelters was suspended, mainly copper smelters were built. From 1721 to 1725, 11 plants were built in the Urals, of which only Nizhny Tagil was blast-furnace and iron-making, the rest were either copper-smelting (Polevskoy and Pyskorsky), or copper-smelting and iron-making (Verkhne-Uktussky and Yekaterinburg). In total, from 1701 to 1740, 24 state and 31 private metallurgical plants were built in the Urals, which determined the specialization of the region as a quality industrial metallurgical center. Private factories were characterized by higher profitability compared to state-owned. The growth of iron smelting in the Urals over 25 years (from 1725 to 1750) amounted to 250%: from 0.6 million poods to 1.5 million poods.

In the 1730s, the construction of fortresses and factories began in the Southern Urals, on the lands of the Bashkirs. In 1734, Anna Ioannovna approved the project of colonization of the Southern Urals submitted by the Chief Secretary of the Senate, I. K. Kirilov, and appointed him the Chief Commander of the Orenburg expedition. The tasks of the expedition included the construction of the fortress city of Orenburg, a line of defensive fortresses in order to exclude the raids of the Bashkirs, development of the natural resources of the region, and the opening of trade routes to Asia. In autumn of 1736, 100 versts to the south-east of Ufa and 10 versts from the Tabynsky fortress, the construction of the Resurrection (Tabynsky) copper smelter, the first in the Southern Urals, was started. On May 22, 1744, a decree of the Berg Collegium was issued, which allowed for the purchase from the Bashkirs and other owners of the deposit, forests and land for the construction of mining plants. In the period from 1745 to 1755, 20 factories were built on the territory of Bashkiria. By 1781, there were 38 factories in total. During the years of the Peasant War, 89 mining plants were damaged to varying degrees. With the beginning of the uprising, in the first half of October 1773, the closest private copper plants to Orenburg were seized: Verkhotorsky, Voskresensky, Preobrazhensky and Kano-Nikolsky plants. From November to December, all plants in the Southern Urals (24 plants) were seized. By the beginning of 1774, the uprising covered the Middle Urals, the number of captured factories in January reached 39, in February - 92. Individual factories resumed work for short periods of time in 1774, despite the occupation. With the suppression of the uprising, the work of the factories began to recover. By the beginning of 1775, about two thirds of all the Ural factories were working. By the end of 1775, the least destroyed factories of the Southern Urals began to resume their work.

Since the middle of the 18th century, state-owned Ural factories began to produce gold, and since 1819, platinum. Later, mining was permitted for all Russian subjects, which led to the rapid propagation of gold mines in the Urals. In the 1750s and 1760s, the construction of factories in the Urals continued intensively, thanks to the high profitability of production and the support of the authorities. In addition to the Demidovs and Stroganovs, entrepreneurs Osokins, Tverdyshevs, I. S. Myasnikov, and M. M. Pokhodyashin, as well as officials and nobles: P. I. Shuvalov, M. M. Golitsyn, and A. I. Glebov began to build factories. Only the Yekaterinburg and Kamensky plants remained in the state administration, the rest were transferred to private management. Later, many private factories were returned to the treasury for debts (in 1764 — the factories of Count Shuvalov, in 1770 — Count Chernyshev's, in 1781 — Count Vorontsov's). By the end of the 17th century, the largest companies in Russia were the Demidovs, Yakovlevs, Batashovs and Mosolovs, which produced about half of all iron in the country.

In 1767, about 140 metallurgical plants operating in the Urals made the region a leader in world iron production and secured a monopoly position in Russia in copper smelting. By the end of the 18th century, the number of serf workers in the Ural factories reached 74.1 thousand people, and the number of registered peasants reached 212.7 thousand people. In 1800, the Ural factories produced 80.1% of cast iron, 88.3% of iron, and 100% of copper of the all-Russian production volume. Thanks to this, Russia came out on top in the world for iron production and smelted from 20 to 27% of the world's copper.

From the end of the 18th century to the beginning of the 19th century, problems with the supply of wood worsened at most of the Ural mining plants. The forests of the factory dachas were cut down at a distance of 5 to 25 versts. The old factories had even greater distances: the Kamensk plant had 50-55 versts, and the Nevyansk plant had 40-70 versts. Decrees were issued prohibiting unauthorized logging.

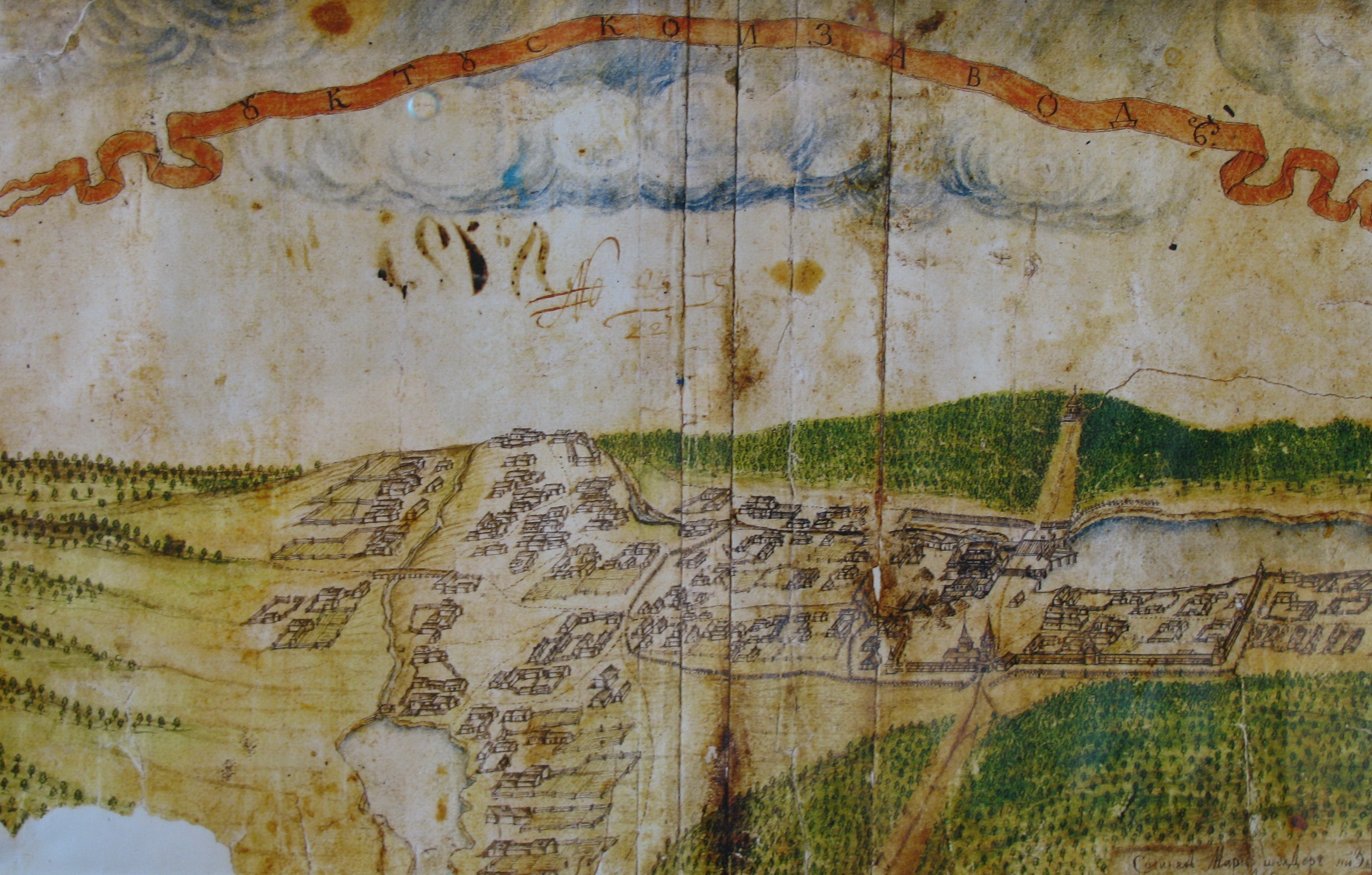
Uktussky factory plan, 1720

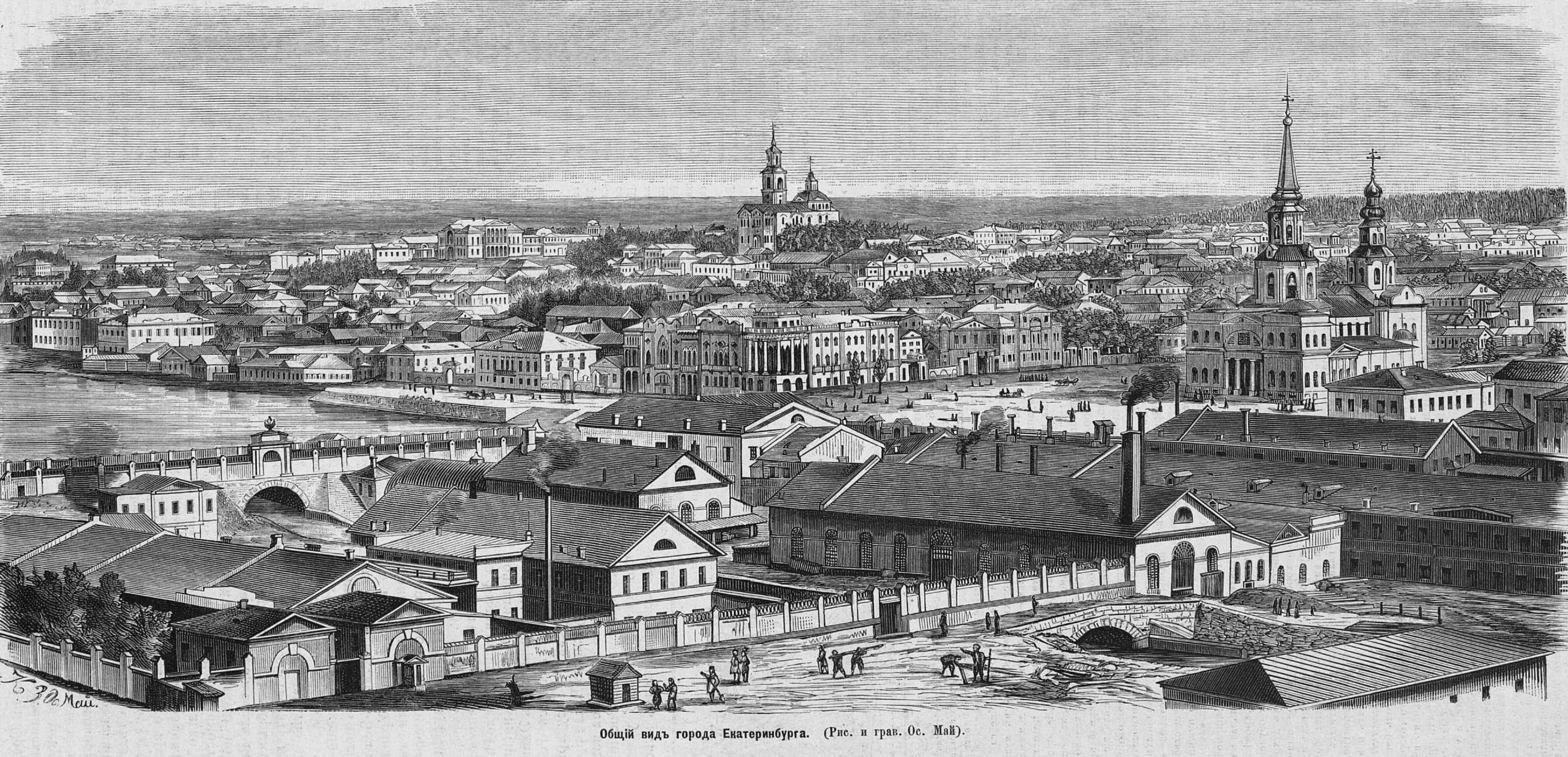
Yekaterinburg plant layout, 1874

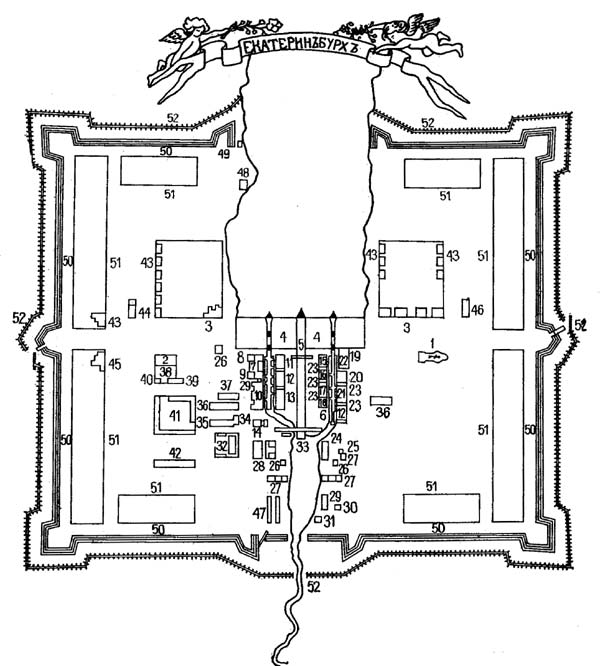
Yekaterinburg factory plan, 1729

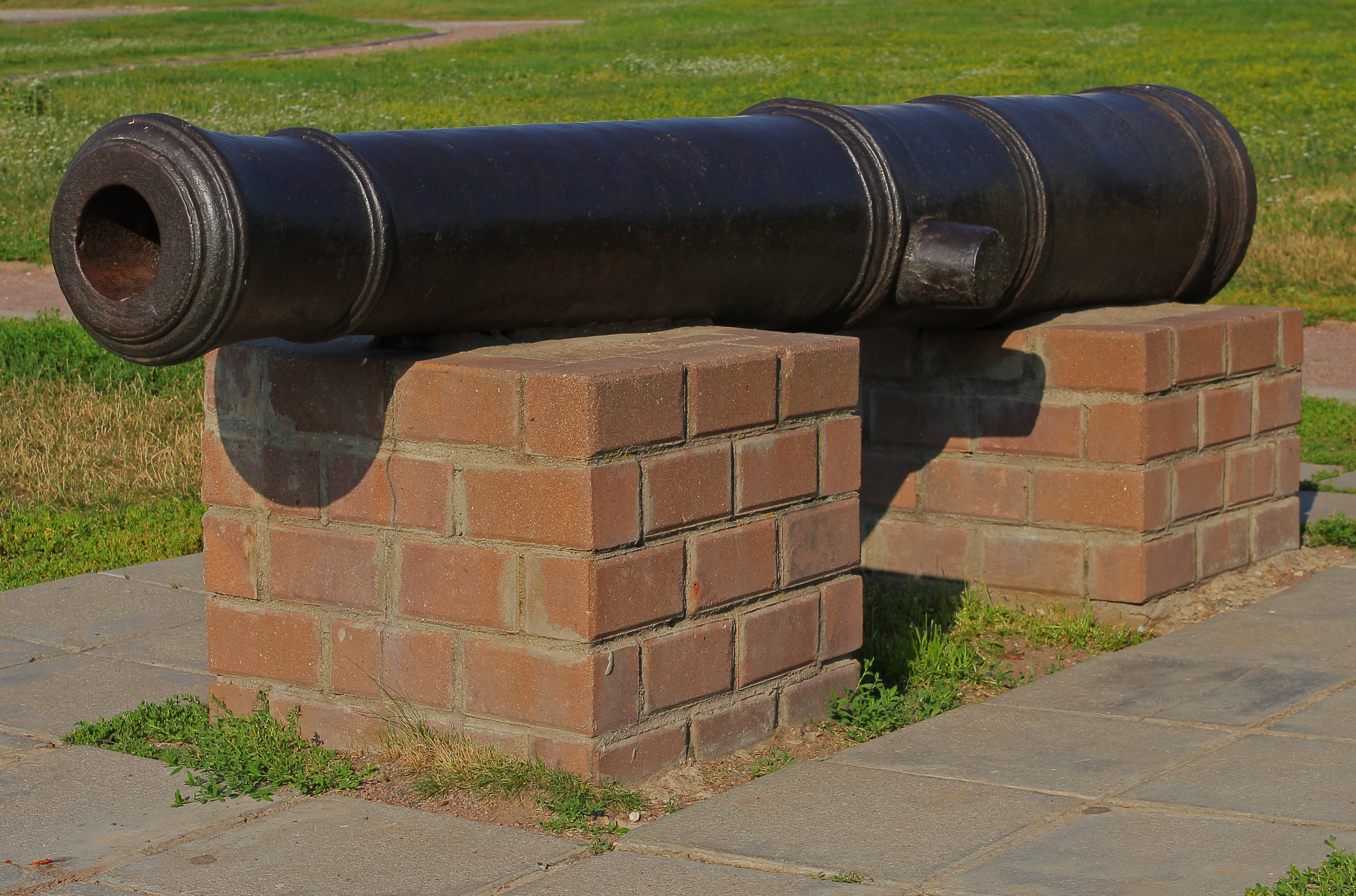
12-foot cannon of the Kamensky plant, 1704

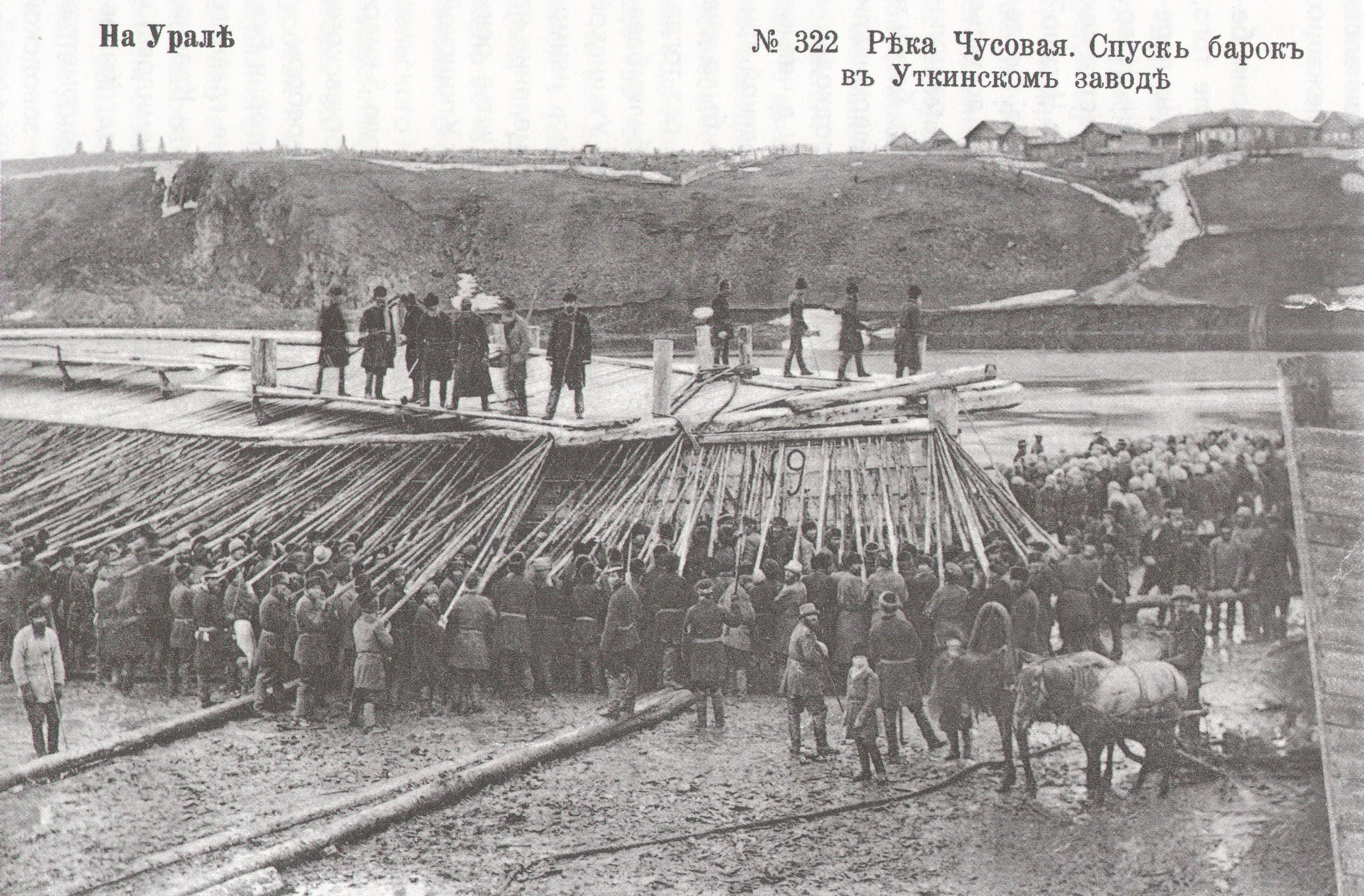
Descent of the barges on the Utkinskaya pier, 1893

=== The 19th century ===
The industrial revolution at the Ural mining plants consisted of three major stages:

- Early 19th century - 1830s: the appearance of the first steam engines, the development of blast furnace production, and the introduction of rolling mills.
- 1840-1870s: the development and implementation of more progressive methods of obtaining iron: puddling, kontuaz furnaces, and Lancashire hearth.
- 1880-1910s: introduction of open-hearth and Bessemer methods of steel production, and the complete displacement of water wheels by steam and other engines.

The replacement of wooden bellows with cylindrical blowers in the early 19th century reduced coal consumption by up to 20% and doubled the productivity of blast furnaces. Further development of blast furnace technology was associated with increasing the height of the furnaces, optimizing their profile and increasing the power of the blower motors. Cupola furnaces appeared at factories, and the casting of metals became a separate production. In 1808, serf S. I. Badaev invented a method for producing cast steel, later called Badaevskaya, for which he received his freedom and in 1811 was sent to the Votkinsk Plant to organize production. At the Zlatoust plant since 1828, experiments on the production of cast steel were conducted by P. P. Anosov.

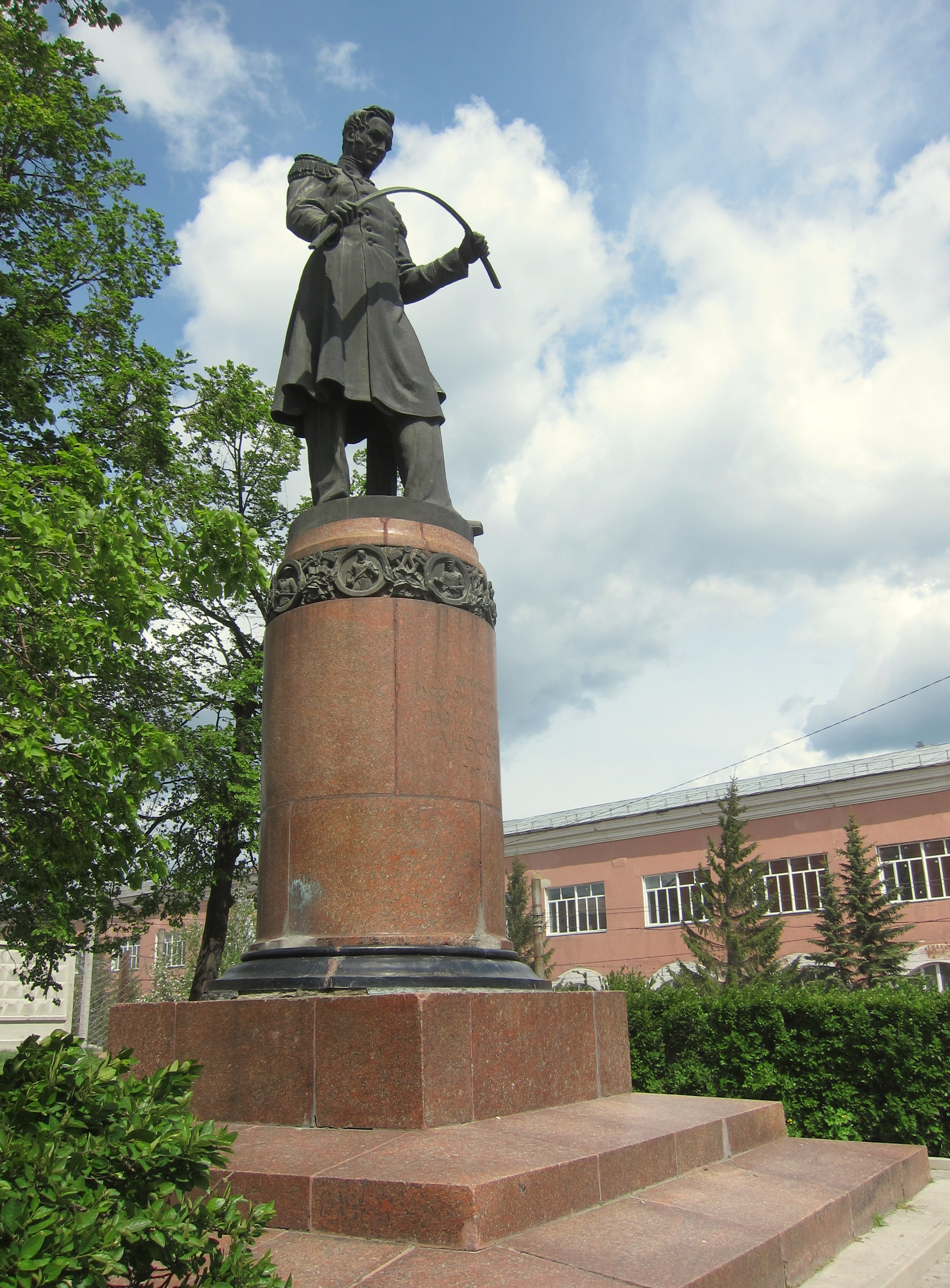
Monument to P. P. Anosov in Zlatoust

Foreign engineers played a significant role in the development of existing plants and the construction of new ones in the Urals. In the 18th century, up to 600 German metallurgists worked at the factories of the Yekaterinburg Department at various times. At the beginning of the 19th century, 140 craftsmen from Europe were invited to the Izhevsk Arms Factory, and 115 German gunsmiths and steelworkers were invited to the Zlatoust Arms Factory. After the end of the contract, many foreigners remained in the factories as freelance workers. (Note: The first wave of immigration of contract engineers from Saxony is associated with the transfer in 1739 of the state-owned Goroblagodat factories into the possession of K. von Schemberg, the head of the Berg Directorate, which was the Berg Collegium during the reign of Anna Ioannovna. The topic of German immigration to the Urals is considered in more detail in the collective monograph by V. M. Kirillov, L. A. Dashkevich, etc.)

Administrative changes at the beginning of the 19th century were associated with the approval in 1806 of the Mining Charter, compiled by A. F. Deryabin and later included in part in the Code of Laws of 1832, (Note: The miners pointed out the gaps in the mining legislation. In particular, ambiguities in the wording of the Charter regulating state supervision of the work of private factories led to contradictions and conflicts. Subsequently, the provisions of the Mining Charter were repeatedly corrected, including in connection with the abolition of serfdom. The chronology and problems of mining reforms in Russia of the 19th century are considered in more detail in the monograph by G. E. Neklyudov.) and the formation of the Mining Department, which was transformed in 1811 into the Department of Mining and Salt Affairs.

In the period from 1801 to 1860, 37 new plants were built in the Urals, including 3 copper smelters. Next to the previously built factories, auxiliary plants were built, which used the wastewater of the main factories and were actually their rolling shops. During the same period, 14 Ural copper smelters were closed due to the refusal of mints' coinage and the transition to paper money. To stabilize the situation, the government in 1834 abolished all taxes from factories, except for tithes. At the same time, the level of copper production at the beginning of the century was reached only in 1826. Since the 1850s, due to the appearance of cheap English, and later — Chilean, North American, and Australian copper on the market, the metallurgical industry of the Southern Urals entered a period of long-term crisis. In 1859, the price of Russian copper in comparison with the level of 1854 had decreased by 50%.

Steam engines were introduced and took root in the Urals slowly. The first steam engines appeared in the Ural factories in the last years of the 18th century. From 1800 to the 1810s, machines often failed and consumed a lot of firewood, which caused their slow spread. In the 1830s, the machines became more reliable, there were machine-building enterprises that designed, assembled, and repaired steam engines. In 1834, the Cherepanovs built the first steam locomotive and the first railway with a length of 853.4 m, designed to deliver ore from the Vysokogorsky mine to the Vysky plant. By 1840, the number of steam engines in the Ural factories reached 73 units. Also in the 1840s, hydraulic turbines became widespread in the Urals, replacing low-performance water wheels.

Methods for the production of iron in the factories of the Urals in 1860
| Method | Number of Factories | Share, % |
|---|---|---|
| Puddling | 45 | 37,2 |
| Puddling and Kontuaz | 13 | 10,8 |
| Kontuaz | 24 | 19,8 |
| Starokrychny | 39 | 32,2 |

In the 1840s, the introduction of the Kontuaz method of iron production began at the Ural factories. The Yuryuzan-Ivanovsky plant in 1840 and the Simsky plant in 1842 were the first to switch to it. Subsequently, the Kontuaz forges were built at state-owned factories, and later at private ones. By 1861, 364 Kontuaz forges operated at 37 factories in the Urals. In the 1860s and 1870s, when production was already supplanted by steelmaking, Lancashire forges appeared in the Urals. A more productive puddling process was introduced in the Urals in 1817 in a test mode at the Pozhevsky plant, from 1825 to 1830 at the Nizhniy Tagil plant, and in September 1837 the Votkinsky plant completely switched to puddling. By 1861, among 58 factories, there were 201 puddling furnaces, 34 gas puddling, 153 welding, and 23 gas welding furnaces. Before the widespread use of steel-making processes in 1857, P. M. Obukhov invented a cheap method, called Obukhov, of steel production at the Zlatoust plant.

The height of the Ural blast furnaces in the 19th century reached 18 meters, which significantly exceeded the height of European furnaces. This advantage made it possible to carry out the blast furnace process on a cold blast with relatively low costs. This led to the later introduction of hot blast in the Urals, although successful experiments on its use were carried out back in the 1830s and 1840s at the Kushvinsky, Lysvensky, Verkh-Isetsky, and other plants. Thanks to the events of the Industrial Revolution in England, the average productivity of blast furnaces in the Ural factories in the second half of the 19th century was already inferior to those in England. So, in 1800, one blast furnace in the Urals produced an average of 91.6 thousand poods of iron, and in 1860, 137 thousand poods. British furnaces produced respectively 65.5 thousand and 426 thousand poods.

Since the middle of the 19th century, rolling production has developed, and steel and iron casting continued to develop. Castings from the Kasli plant have become world-famous. At large factories, rail rolling production was mastered. In 1859, 12.2 million poods of iron were smelted at the factories of the Urals, which was about 2/3 of all iron smelted in Russia.

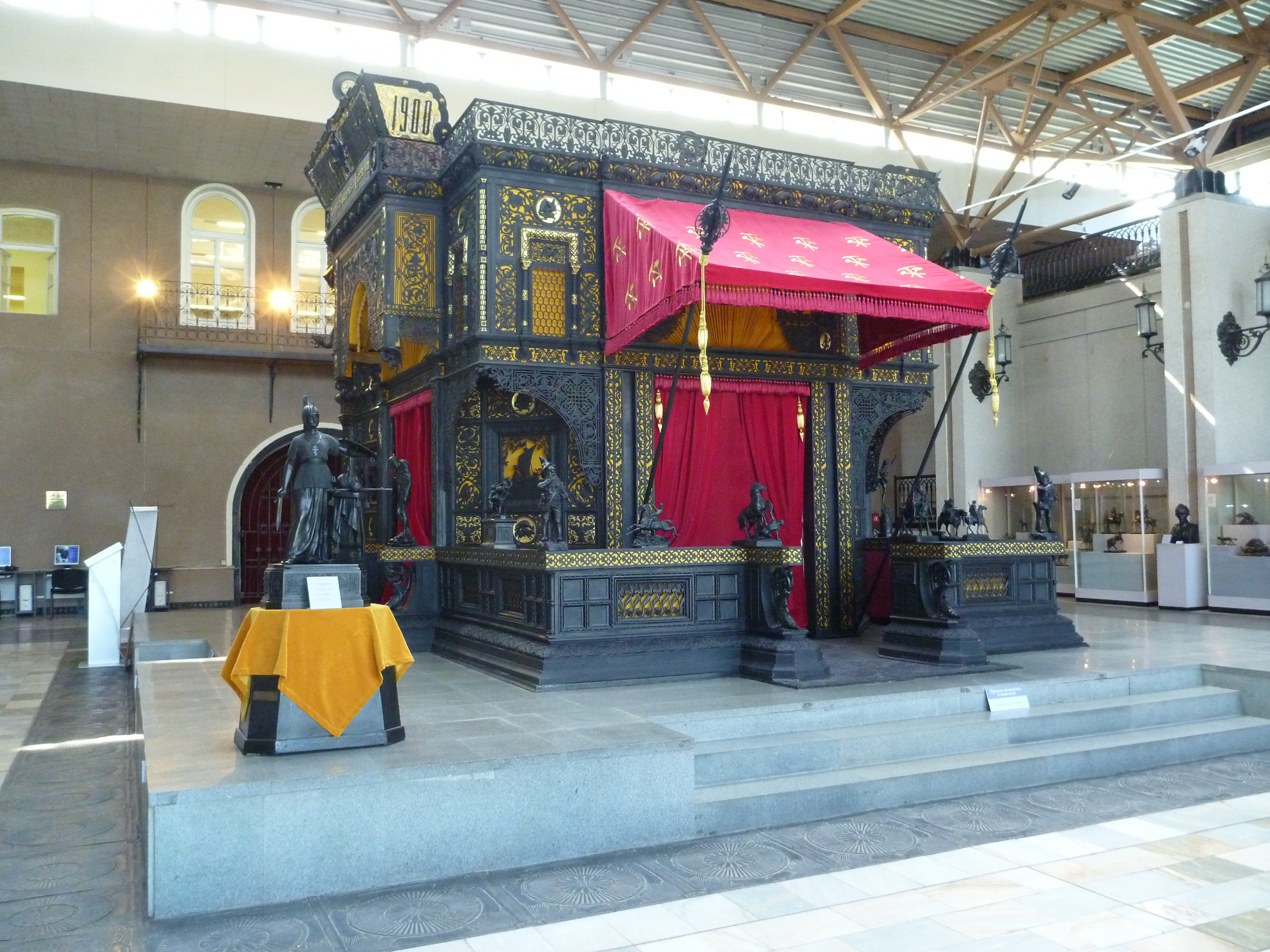
Kasli Cast Iron Pavilion

During the Patriotic War of 1812, many Ural factories were converted to weapons production facilities. The Kamensk plant issued 87,274 poods of artillery pieces during 1810–1813. During the war years, 47 private factories crossed over to manufacturing shells, some of which had never produced such products. Often, production plans were frustrated, and the cast guns did not withstand testing due to haste and unexploited technologies. The victory in the Patriotic War of 1812 did not allow the authorities to identify these problems. At the same time, the war substantially reduced the demand of the domestic market for metal, which led to inflation and long standstills at factories.

The casting of artillery pieces resumed in 1834. Before the beginning of the Crimean War, from 1834 to 1852, the Ural factories cast 1,542 guns instead of the 3,250 ordered, on average, orders for the production of shells were fulfilled by about 23-25 %. Already during the war, the supply of 60-pounder guns was disrupted due to a gap in testing. During the defense of Sevastopol, 900 Ural guns were unsuitable.

The development of the Ural copper-smelting industry in the 19th century was associated with an increase in the height of furnaces, the use of hot blast and coal. Steam engines began to be used to lift the ore to the surface and pump water out of the mines. Copper production has shifted to the Northern and Southern Urals. In the second half of the 19th century, copper smelting began to decline due to the depletion of deposits and reduced demand from mints.

Since the 1820s, gold and platinum mining has been rapidly developing in the Urals. In 1823, there were 309 mines in the region. 105 poods of gold were mined. In 1842, (Note: According to other data, the nugget was found in 1841.) the largest Ural gold nugget weighing 36.04 kg was found at the Tsarevo-Alexandrovsky mine. Platinum was mined at the mines of the Nizhniy Tagil district of the Demidovs, at the Isov mines of the Verkh-Isetsk district, and at the Krestovozdvizhensk mines. In the 19th century, the Urals produced 93–95% of the world's platinum.

In the 18th century and first half of the 19th century, the use of adolescent and child labor was widespread in the mines and factories of the Urals, sanctioned by a number of legislative acts and reinforced in the Mining Statute of 1842. In the 1850s, children and adolescents accounted for 30 to 50% of all workers in factories, and in mines - from 40 to 85%. At the beginning of the 19th century, women were employed in 17% of factories. In the 1850s, female labor was already more widely used, and the proportion of women was about 10% of the workers.

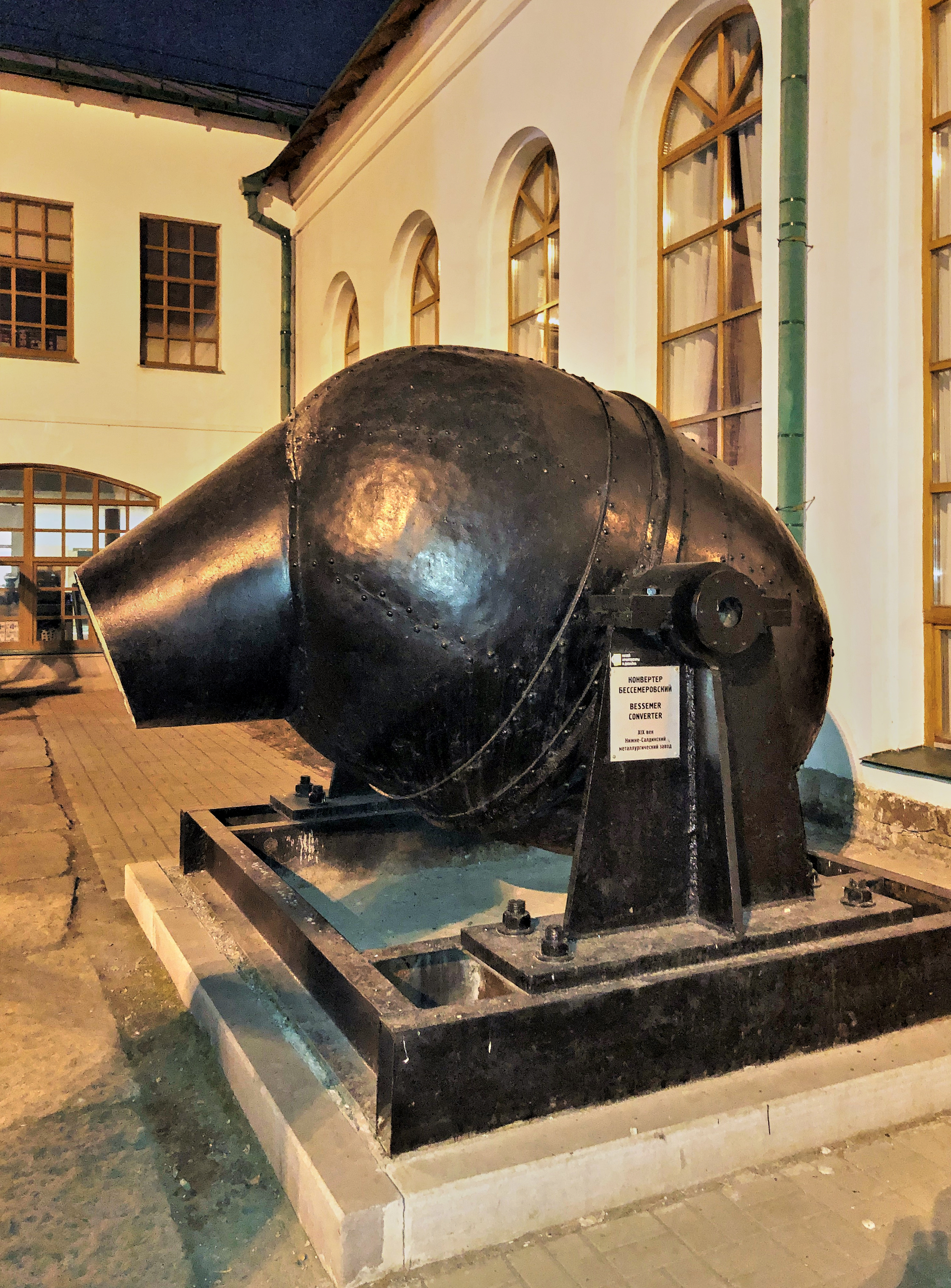
Model of the Bessemer converter of the Nizhnesaldinsky plant (19th century) at the exposition of the Museum of the Ural State Academy of Architecture and Arts in Yekaterinburg

By the time of the abolition of serfdom, the Ural metallurgy was in a deep crisis, which was facilitated by a sharp increase in grain prices in 1857 due to crop failures, especially significant in the Northern Urals. Of the 41 mining districts, 13 had a total debt of 8.1 million rubles, which increased to 12.4 million rubles by the end of the 1860s. The transition to freelance labor led to a sharp reduction in the number of workers in factories. If in 1860 there were 8,663 workers at the seven Goroblagodatsky factories, in 1861 — 7,030, then in 1862 the number decreased to 4,671 people, in 1863 - to 3,097, and in 1864 - to 2,839 people. During this period, there were 154 metallurgical plants of various specializations and gold crafts in the Urals, including 24 state-owned, 78 possessory, and 52 manorial ones. Of these, 115 enterprises were located within the Perm Governorate, 26 in the Orenburg Governorate, and 13 in the Vyatka Governorate.

In 1824, to support the miners, the government established a State Loan Bank. According to the data of 1849, the State Loan Bank pledged the Kanonikolsky, Beloretsky, Voskresensky, Troitsky, Blagoveshchensky, Yuryuzan-Ivanovsky mining districts a total amount of 1,106,995 rubles in silver. In 1851, the Beloretsk Mining District was re-mortgaged to the bank, and in 1852, the Preobrazhensky Plant was mortgaged to private investors in the amount of 300 thousand rubles with the obligation to pay the debt to the bank. In general, the pre-reform level of production at the Ural factories was reached only in 1870. The Government provided support to mining companies in the form of soft loans secured by metals and orders for the construction of railways. The industry was heavily influenced by commercial banks and wealthy entrepreneurs who bought up entire mountain districts. In the 1880s, mining plants began to be incorporated.

In 1870, at the invitation of the Russian government, the Austrian metallurgist P. von Tunner visited an industrial exhibition in St. Petersburg and inspected the Ural metallurgical plants. As a result of this trip, in 1871, he published a book with a description of the factories, in which he noted the technical and organizational backwardness of the metallurgy of the Urals, and the high cost of production. Von Tunner's book eventually became the first systematic description of the Ural mining plants.

The lack of customs regulation of foreign supplies of metals had a negative impact on the development of Ural metallurgy. European metallurgical companies in the 2nd half of the 19th century actively united in syndicates to regulate market prices and control production volumes. The surplus, as a rule, was exported to the Russian markets and sold at low prices. This led to overstocking of markets and lower prices for metals. The amount of unsold metal at the Nizhny Novgorod Fair was 0.9 million poods in 1883, 1.16 million poods in 1884, 1.84 million poods in 1885, and 1.94 million poods in 1886.

In the 1880s and 1890s, 16 metallurgical plants were built in the Urals, including the large Chusovsky (1883) and Nadezhdinsky plants(1896). The old factories underwent significant modernization, including the introduction of mechanical processing plants, the construction of open-hearth shops, power plants, and air heaters. The introduction of hot blast was promoted in the 1860s and 1870s in the factories of the Urals. Rashet blast furnaces equipped with trapping devices for heating the air were used. Despite these successes, since 1896, the Urals has lost the primacy in the share of metal produced to enterprises in Southern Russia. In 1900, the Ural factories smelted 50.1 million poods of iron. The first open-hearth furnaces in the Urals were built in 1871 at Votkinsky and in 1875 at the Perm Cannon Factory. By 1900, there were a total of 42 of the furnace. Bessemerization in the Urals was first introduced at the Nizhnesaldinsky and Katav-Ivanovsky plants. In 1900, 48.9% of the Ural finished ferrous metal was produced by open-hearth and Bessemer methods.

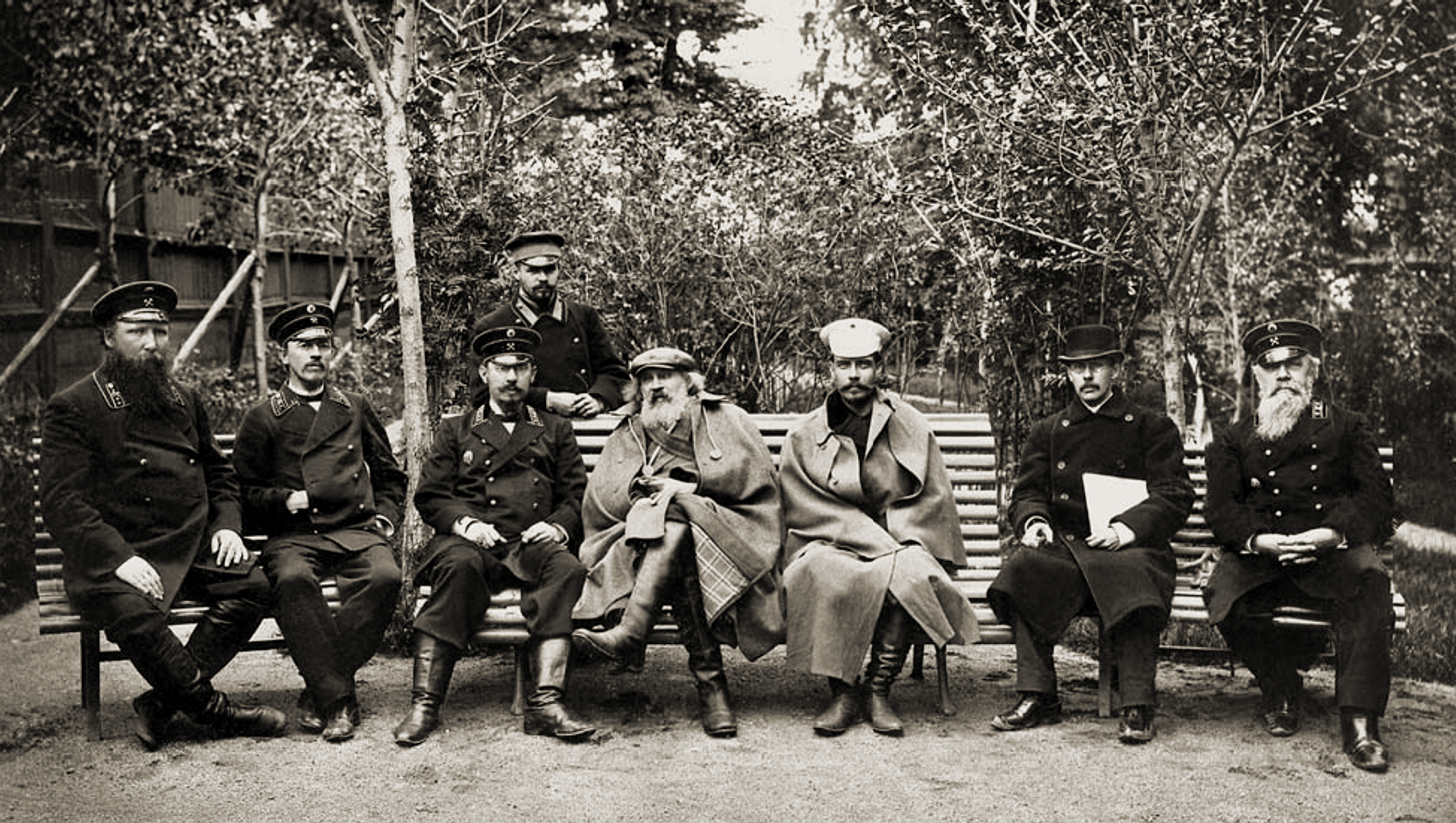
D. I. Mendeleev and P. A. Zemyatchensky (in the center) at the Kushvinsky plant, 1899

By the end of the 19th century, with the expansion of factories in the Urals, the problems with the depletion of forest resources and environmental pollution intensified.

In 1899, on behalf of S. Yu. Witte, an expedition of scientists headed by D. I. Mendeleev was sent to the Urals, the main task of which was to find out the causes of stagnation in the metallurgical industry. In his report, Mendeleev called the main reasons for the industrial crisis of the Ural metallurgy, off-road conditions, the preserved serf relations between factory owners and peasants, the use of outdated equipment and technologies, the monopoly of large entrepreneurs on ore and forests, and the arbitrariness of local authorities. As a result of the expedition, a plan was drawn up for the development of Ural metallurgy with an increase in the volume of iron smelting to 300 million poods per year, which did not find the support of the authorities.

== The 20th to the 21st centuries ==
At the beginning of the 20th century, the entire Russian industry was in a deep crisis, the consequences of which affected the factories of the Urals until 1909. In 1909, the Ural iron and steel plants smelted 34.7 million tons of iron, which is 30.9% less than in 1900. During the crisis years, the share of finished iron increased, new markets were searched for, syndicates and associations were created to fight the competition of factories in Southern Russia. To a lesser extent, the crisis affected the copper smelting industry, thanks to continued demand and an increase in customs duties on copper imports. In the first decade of the 20th century, small technically backward factories with worn-out equipment, which had become unprofitable, were closed. Of the 111 metallurgical plants operating in the Urals in 1900, 35 plants were shut down by 1913. In conditions of tough competition, factories were forced to modernize: blast furnaces with a lightweight casing were erected, hot blast was introduced everywhere, steam engines and ore preparation for smelting, furnaces and puddling furnaces were replaced by open-hearth furnaces, more powerful rolling mills were built, and factories received electricity. In the mountainous districts, the optimization and reorganization of capacities were carried out: the final processing was concentrated, as a rule, at the main plant of the district, the rest of the factories provided supplies of iron. During the Russo-Japanese War, the Izhevsk, Perm, and Zlatoust arms factories sharply increased the production of guns, rifles, and shells.

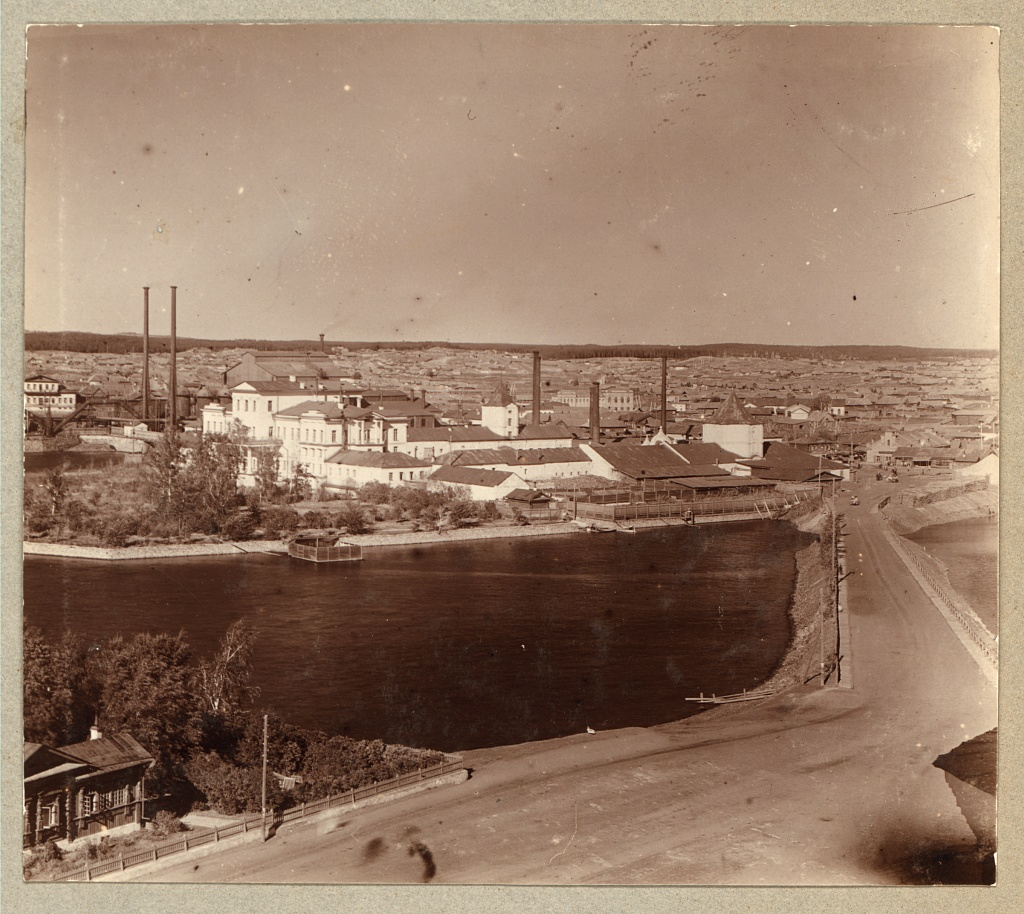
Kyshtymsky Plant, around 1905.

In 1908, the construction of the Porogi electrometallurgical plant for the production of ferroalloys, and one of the first hydroelectric power plants in Russia to provide the plant with electricity began. Until 1931, the plant was the only producer of ferroalloys in the country.

In 1910, an industrial boom began, which continued until the First World War. From 1910 to 1913, the production of iron increased to 55.3 million poods (by 29.9%), finished metal products - up to 40.8 million poods (by 9.6%). But the share of the Ural factories in the all-Russian iron smelting fell to 21.6%. Commercial banks actively invested in the development of the metallurgy of the Urals. The most important role in the Urals was played by the Azov-Don Commercial Bank, Saint Petersburg International Commercial Bank, and Russo-Asiatic Bank. The volume of investments at the turn of the 20th century was estimated at 10.8 million rubles. Modernization and reconstruction of mountain districts continued. In 1911, a new blast furnace with a volume of 150 m^{3} and an open-hearth furnace with a capacity of 25 tons were launched at the Nizhniy Tagil plant; two Bessemer converters and two new blast furnaces were installed at the Nizhnesaldinsky plant. The Votkinsk plant was reconstructed for the production of steam locomotives and river vessels. The factories that produced weapons were reconstructed and switched over to the production of civilian products. Also in the pre-war years, the concentration of production at large factories increased: in 1914, out of 49 Ural plants, 16 had the productivity of more than 1 million poods of iron per year and produced 65% of the total volume, including 5 factories with a capacity of more than 2 million poods of iron per year. Nadezhdinsky, Nizhnesaldinsky, Zlatoustovsky, Chusovskoy, and Votkinsky produced 36.1% of the total volume.

Copper smelters of the Urals at the beginning of the 20th century mastered pyrite smelting, which made it possible to process poor sulfur ores. In the pre-war years, the Nizhnekyshtymsky Copper Electrolytic Plant, the Karabashsky, and Kalatinsky plants were launched. Through syndicates formed, British companies owned 65.5% of the copper mined in the Urals. The gold-platinum mining industry underwent mechanization. The first Dutch dredges appeared in 1900 at the Neozhidany Mine on the Is River. By 1913, the number of dredges in the Urals reached 50, they ensured the extraction of 20% of gold and 50% of platinum. Until 1913, the average production of gold in the Urals was 550-650 poods per year, while the average production of platinum was 300-350 poods per year.

=== World War I and Civil War ===
The modernization of private and state-owned factories and the construction of railways, which began in the 1910s, were not completed by the beginning of the war. Thinking the war would be brief, the government did not involve the private factories of the Urals in the production of guns and shells until the summer of 1915. As a result, the Ural industry was late in getting involved in providing the army with weapons and equipment. In 1914–1916, state-owned factories maintained the pre-war production of iron, but completely stopped the production of roofing iron in favor of military products. The production of high-grade iron and projectile steel was almost doubled. The sharp increase in production volumes was hindered by the lack of fuel resources, labor, and means for transporting goods. In 1915–1916, due to the lack of fuel in the Urals, 22 blast furnaces were stopped, and 11 furnaces worked at a reduced capacity. The situation was aggravated by the disorganization of railway transportation due to the priority of military needs and the mobilization of qualified personnel. In the summer of 1915, a commission headed by General A. A. Manikovsky was sent to the Urals to negotiate with private factory owners and explore the possibility of private factories participating in the production of military products, and to coordinate the actions of private factories. On November 7, 1915, the Ural Factory Meeting was established under the leadership of the Chief Head of the Ural Mining Department, P. I. Yegorov. In the future, it became obvious that the created administrative apparatus could not fulfill the tasks assigned to it. The difficult situation at the front in 1915 and the acute shortage of weapons forced the government to accept the inflated demands of entrepreneurs. As a result of negotiations, military orders were accepted by private factory owners at increased prices. The total cost of the orders was estimated at 200 million rubles.

Production of ferrous metals in the Urals by year, thousand tons
| | 1913 | 1917 | 1918 | 1919 | 1920 |
|---|---|---|---|---|---|
Iron
| Russia | 4216.3 | 2964.1 | 596.9 | 116.5 | 115.8 |
| Urals | 913.5 | 722.3 | 256.5 | 59.1 | 82.5 |
| Ural percentage | 21.7 | 24.4 | 43.0 | 50.7 | 71.2 |
Steel
| Russia | 4246.9 | 3079.6 | 402.1 | 199.1 | 161.8 |
| Urals | 906.5 | 828.9 | 151.5 | 79.3 | 117.9 |
| Ural percentage | 21.3 | 26.9 | 37.7 | 39.8 | 72.9 |
Rolled metal products
| Russia | 3509.0 | 2443.6 | 357.3 | 179.3 | 147.2 |
| Urals | 668.5 | 636.2 | 154.6 | 67.7 | 86.3 |
| Ural percentage | 19.1 | 26.0 | 43.3 | 37.8 | 58.6 |

The position of the working people worsened during the war years. The working day increased to 12 hours, women and children worked on an equal basis with men, but they were paid half as much. The organization of production was unsatisfactory: the factories received orders that they could not fulfill due to the lack of necessary equipment. After the defeat of the Russian troops in 1915–1916, 87% of the Ural factories switched to the production of military products. With the support of the authorities, commercial companies with the participation of foreign capital developed. In 1915–1918, large machine-building plants were evacuated from the front-line territories of the Baltics and Petrograd, to the Urals. The staff of the arms factories was replenished with evacuated specialists.

After the February Revolution, power passed into the hands of provincial commissars appointed by the Provisional Government. Ural miners supported the Provisional Government and its bodies. On March 4, 1917, the Council of Miners' Congresses asked the government to appoint a commissar to control the work of the Ural factories. Such a commissar was appointed, businessman V. I. Europeus, who headed the created Provisional Committee of the Ural Mining District. At some factories (Nyazepetrovsky, Sosvensky, Bilimbaevsky, Zlatoustovsky, Nizhne-Ufaleysky), before the October Revolution, power was partially or completely seized by the Soviets of Workers' Deputies. The state of production continued to deteriorate, there was a critical shortage of fuel, railroad transportation became practically unmanageable, enterprises worked with interruptions, equipment was not repaired or updated in a timely manner. Smelting of pig iron and steel declined rapidly, and the number of industrial accidents increased. The commission sent by the Provisional Government in 1917 to restore the working capacity of the Ural enterprises failed to manage the task.

After the October Revolution, in November 1917, the Ural Factory Meeting was reorganized under the leadership of the Bolsheviks. Its powers were extended by the decree of the Supreme Economic Council of the Republic to the Vyatka, Orenburg, Perm and Ufa provinces, and a number of adjacent districts. The Ural Mining Board and the Yekaterinburg Bureau of the Council of the Congress of Mining Industrialists of the Urals were liquidated. In November - December 1917, the boards of Ural joint-stock companies suspended the transfer of money to factories where Soviet control was introduced, which led to delays in the payment of wages and the accumulation of debts for the supply of raw materials and food. There were pockets of famine and epidemics of diseases, the situation of workers-prisoners of war was especially difficult. In December 1917, the Council of People's Commissars began the nationalization of the mountain districts of the Urals, earlier than other enterprises of the country. By July 1918, more than 4,340 enterprises (25 out of 34 mountain districts of the Urals) had been nationalized. In 1918, in addition to the factory committees established earlier, business councils were established to manage the factories, whose activities were coordinated by the regional board of the nationalized enterprises of the Urals. Such actions led to a certain dual power in the management of enterprises in the industry, and since March 1918, factory committees have been merged with trade unions. Since 1918, systematic training of engineers and workers for the metallurgical industry began in educational institutions of the Urals.

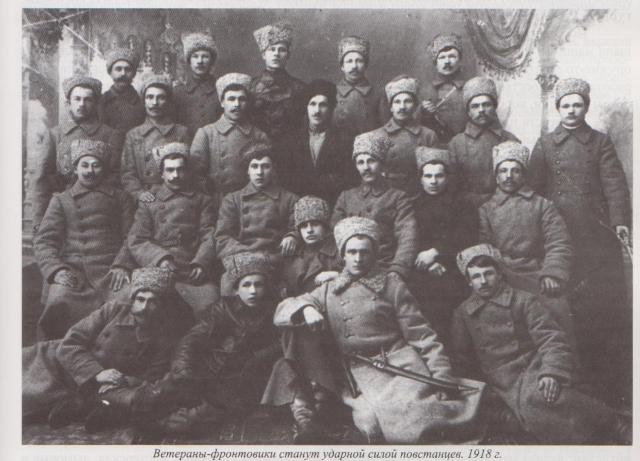
Izhevsk fighters, 1918

Due to supply disruptions and salary delays in the summer and autumn of 1918, anti-Soviet demonstrations took place at the Ural factories. By July 1918, out of 89 Ural blast furnaces, 51 were in operation, and 59 of 88 open-hearth furnaces were in operation. In August, Soviet power was overthrown in Izhevsk and Votkinsk. At the same time, the Regional Government of the Urals was formed in Yekaterinburg, the Ural Industrial Committee was created to manage the industry, the Main Directorate of Mining Affairs of the Urals was established to manage the mining industry, which was transformed in December into the Ural Mining Administration. On August 19, the Provisional Regional Government of the Urals, in its declaration, announced its intention to return the factories to their previous owners. By December 10, 1918, only 36 mining and 9 small and medium-sized coal enterprises in the Urals and Siberia were denationalized. All these changes had practically no effect on the real state of the Ural industry. The plans of the Kolchak government to subsidize the Ural factories also did not come true. The situation was aggravated by the complete dependence of the inhabitants of the factory settlements on the work of enterprises and the political struggle of the provisional governments. In late 1918 - early 1919, the enterprises of Verkh-Isetsky, Revdinsky, Shaitansky, Zlatoustovsky, and a number of other districts were stopped.

After the restoration of Soviet power in the Urals in mid-1919, the management of the factories was centralized under the auspices of the Supreme Council of the National Economy. Later, the Ural Industrial Bureau of the Supreme Economic Council was created. The debts of the enterprises were canceled, a free supply of raw materials and materials was established, finished products were also handed over without payment according to centralized orders. By the end of 1919, 14 blast furnaces, 16 open-hearth furnaces, and 49 rolling mills were operating at the Ural factories. To manage the factories, five regional departments were created: Vysokogorskoe (18 enterprises), Bogoslovskoe (5 enterprises), Yekaterinburg (31 enterprises), Permskoe (17 enterprises), and Yuzhno-Uralskoe (20 enterprises). In 1920, the re-evacuation of workers and specialists from Siberia began, as well as the return of the factory equipment taken out by the White Guards. On the whole, in 1919–1920, only 20% of the metallurgical plants of the Urals operated, and the volume of production was about 10% of the pre-war level. Of the 7 blast furnaces of the Nadezhdinsky Plant, the largest at that time, only one operated; the plants of the Goroblagodatsky Mining District were completely stopped. In total, in the Urals in December 1920, only 9 blast furnaces, 10 open-hearth furnaces, and about a dozen rail, pipe-rolling, and sheet mills were operating, which were completely shut down by August 1921. During the years of the Civil War, the equipment of enterprises was significantly damaged. The smelting of iron in 1921 amounted to 69 thousand tons, which was 7.5% of the pre-war level.

=== The NEP years and the first five-year plans ===
With the end of the war and the adoption of the New Economic Policy (NEP) in March 1921, the restoration of the Ural industry began. Uralplan was created, under whose auspices the development of a program for the integrated development of the region was carried out. Most of the enterprises switched to a self-supporting scheme, which led to the emergence of industrial trusts, which united factories according to industry characteristics. 5 metallurgical trusts were formed in geographical areas, as well as separate trusts "Uralzoloto," "Uralmed," and trusts for the extraction of coal. In 1925, Uralplan developed a "Three-Year Program for the Development of the Metallurgical Industry in the Urals," then a plan for the development of the Urals for 1925-1930 was drawn up, which included, among other things, the construction of the Magnitogorsk Metallurgical Complex. Concession contracts for the smelting of metals and the extraction of minerals operated with varying degrees of success. In 1927, the number of concession contracts in the Urals included 12 companies. Subsequently, the trusts were downsized with the allocation of iron ore trusts. In total, on October 1, 1925, there were 31 trusts in the Urals. After the adoption of the first five-year plan, in 1929 the trust system was abolished.

In the 1920s-1930s, the concentration of production and specialization of factories, which began at the beginning of the 20th century, continued in the metallurgy of the Urals. The Nadezhdinsky Plant focused on rolling of all Ural rails, the Nizhny Salda Plant switched to the production of shaped rolled products, the production of pipes was concentrated at the Pervouralsk Plant, the Verkh-Isetsky Plant switched to the production of transformer steel. Machine-building and mechanical enterprises were separated from metallurgical enterprises. Small mines were actively closed, ore mining was concentrated at the large deposits of Bakalsky, Tagilo-Kushvinsky, Nadezhdinsky, and Alapaevsky districts. Geological exploration work began in 1920 in the Urals, and by 1933 the explored reserves of iron ore amounted to about 2 billion tons, including 478 million tons along Magnitnaya Mountain. There was an acute shortage of fuel resources, which forced metallurgists to switch to mineral fuel. The first successful blast-furnace smelting in the Urals of Kuznetsk coke took place on June 13, 1924, at the Nizhnesaldinsky Plant. Later, Kushvinsky, Nizhnetagilsky, and other plants switched to using coke. By 1926, 37% of the Ural pig iron was smelted using coke, the number of operating blast furnaces was 32, open-hearth furnaces was 47 (in 1913 - 61 and 75, respectively), and their productivity increased 1.5 and 1.7 times, respectively, to the level of production in 1913.

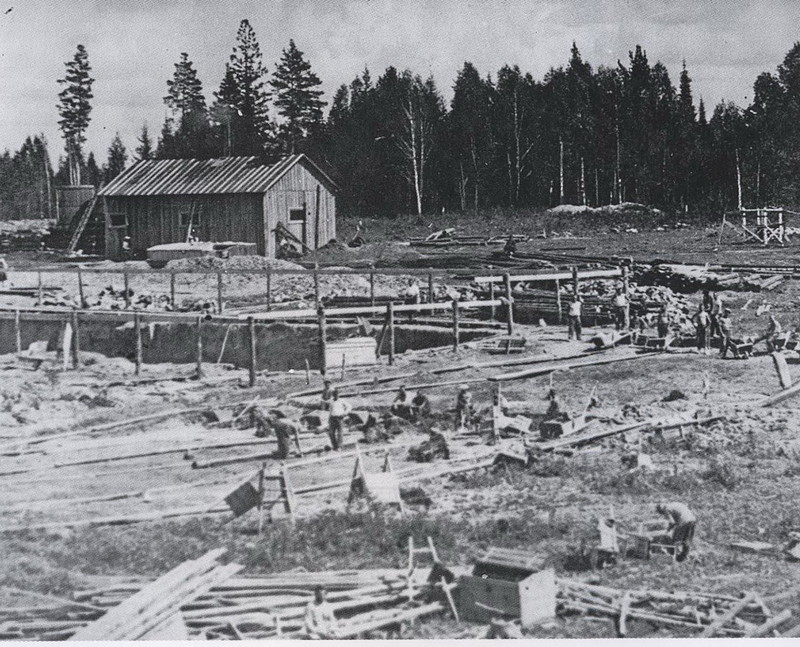
Start of construction of the processing plant Sredneuralsky Copper Smelter (SUMZ), 1935.

The recovery of the copper and gold-platinum industries was much slower due to the greater damage inflicted during the Civil War. In 1921–1922, the extraction of copper ore in the Urals amounted to only 2.2% of the level of 1913, gold - 1.9%, and platinum - 4.3%. By 1928, production amounted to 585.4 thousand tons (88.7% of the level of 1913), and 15 copper mines were able to resume operation.

At the end of the 1920s, Soviet design institutes, with the involvement of foreign companies, began designing the giants of the Ural metallurgy and mechanical engineering — Magnitogorsk, Chelyabinsk and Novotagilsky metallurgical plants, Ural Heavy Machinery Plant, Uralvagonzavod and Pyshminsky Copper-Electrolyte Plant. On May 15, 1930, the Central Committee of the CPSU(b) issued a resolution "On the work of Uralmet," which emphasized the need to create a coal and metallurgical center in the East of the USSR on the basis of coal and ore deposits of the Urals and Siberia. Investments in the construction of new and reconstruction of old plants have increased dramatically. In 1925–1926, 52.6 million rubles were disbursed, and in 1932 — already 1447.7 million rubles. The management of the metallurgical industry was also centralized. In 1931, the Main Directorate of the Metallurgical Industry of the VSNH was liquidated, the main committees were created: Glavchermet, Glavspetsstal, Glavmetiz, and Glavtrubostal. Later, in 1939, the People's Commissariats of Ferrous and Non-Ferrous Metallurgy of the USSR were established.

During the 1st and 2nd five-year plans, mining, ore dressing and ore preparation for smelting developed intensively. Flotation and melting of concentrates in water packs and reverberatory furnaces have been successfully applied in non-ferrous metallurgy. By 1934, 62% of all mined ore was being enriched in the Urals. By the beginning of the 2nd five-year plan, drilling at the mines was fully mechanized. Iron ore production by 1937 reached 8.7 million tons (31% of production in the USSR), and copper ore by 1935 had reached 2.96 million tons. The conversion of blast furnaces to mineral fuel continued: in 1940 86.8% of Ural pig iron was smelted on coke. Only 8 furnaces worked on charcoal, producing special and high-quality cast iron. During the same period, non-ferrous metallurgy plants were built: Krasnouralsky and Sredneuralsky copper smelters, Pyshminsky Copper Electrolytic, Ural Aluminum, Chelyabinsk Zinc, Ufaleysky, Rezhsky and Yuzhno-Uralsky Nickel, Solikamsk and Berezniki Magnesium. Most of the equipment of the new plants was purchased abroad. In 1931, 600 million rubles were spent on the purchase of imported equipment, in 1932 — 270 million rubles, in 1933 — 60 million rubles.

In 1933 and 1937, the People's Commissar of Heavy Industry of the USSR, G.K. Ordzhonikidze issued orders for the development of the gold-platinum industry. The measures taken made it possible in 1936 to extract in the Urals a record 12.8 tons of gold (156.3% compared to the level of 1913) and 4.8 tons of platinum (97.8% compared to the level of 1913).

=== The Great Patriotic War (WWII) ===
By the end of 1941, the Germans occupied most of the industrial territory of the USSR, where 59 blast furnaces, 126 open-hearth furnaces and 13 Electric arc furnace, 16 converters and 105 rolling mills functioned, about 66% of Soviet pig iron, more than 50% of steel and 60% of aluminum were produced. During 1941–1942, equipment and personnel of 832 large factories, which ended up in the front-line zone, were evacuated to the Urals. At the Novotagilsk Plant, an armored mill was launched, removed from the Kirov Plant. At the Sinarsky Plant, a thin-walled pipe workshop was launched from the equipment of the Dnepropetrovsk Pipe Plant. A middle-sheet workshop was built at the Magnitogorsk plant with equipment from Zaporizhstal, and an armored mill was evacuated from the Mariupol Plant. The Urals became the main supplier of metal in the country. The production of civilian products was minimized. All metallurgical plants switched to the production of weapons. To increase the production of alloy steels required for the manufacture of military equipment, the production of ferroalloys was often carried out in units not intended for this - blast furnaces and open-hearth furnaces.

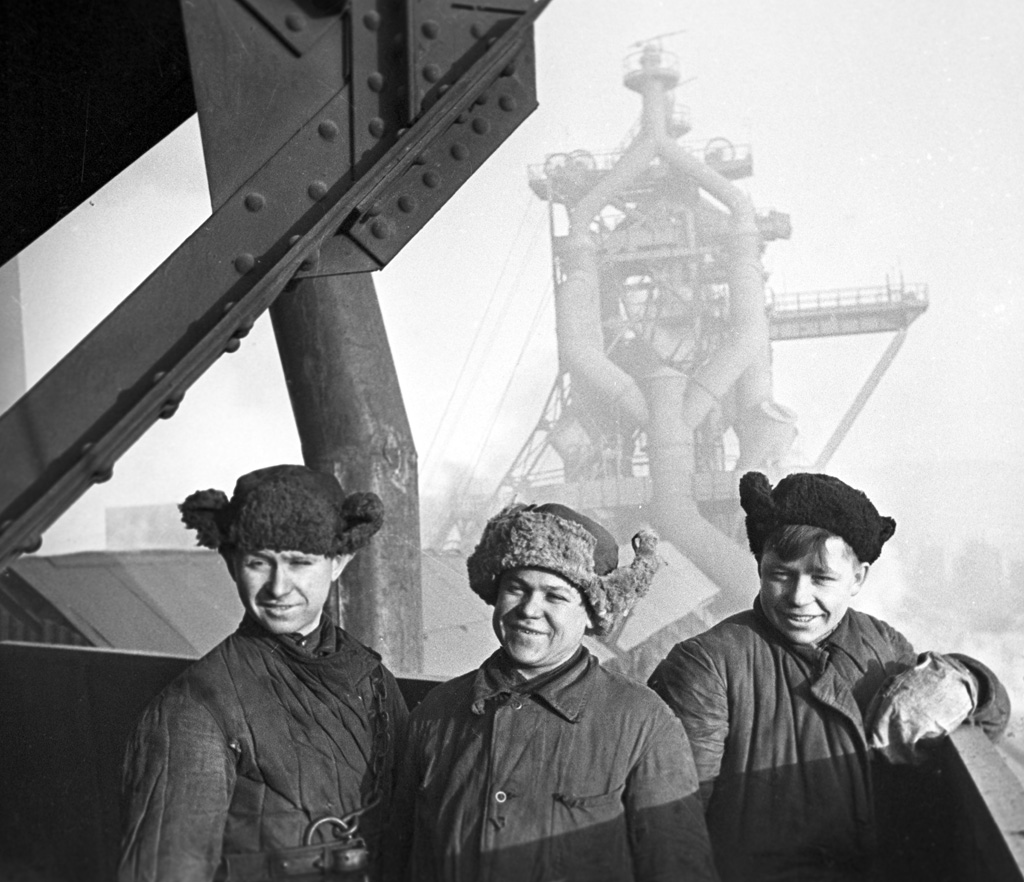
Komsomol members at the construction of blast furnace No. 6 MMK, 1943

During the war years, the construction of metallurgical enterprises continued. Magnitogorsk and Nizhnetagilsky combines, Zlatoust, Pervouralsky, Beloretsk Iron and Steel Works, Chusovsky Metallurgical, Magnitogorsk Hardware, and Chelyabinsk Ferroalloy Plant were declared shock construction sites. In total, during the war years, 10 blast furnaces and 32 open-hearth furnaces, 16 electric furnaces, 16 ferroalloy furnaces, 2 Bessemer converters, 12 rolling and 6 pipe rolling mills, 11 coke batteries, more than 100 shafts and coal mines were built, and launched in the Urals. Chelyabinsk and Chebarkul Metallurgical, Chelyabinsk Pipe Rolling, Magnitogorsk Calibration, Berezniki Magnesium, Bogoslovsky Aluminum, and Miass Machine-Building Plant were also built.

In conditions of martial law, it was required to dramatically increase the volume of mined ore. Priority was given to the rich and accessible deposits of the Magnitnaya and Vysokaya mountains, which in 1943 accounted for 81.1% of all Ural iron ore. Intensive production at these fields led to their rapid depletion. To provide manganese in a short time, the Polunochnoye and Marsyatskoye fields were developed in the north of the modern Sverdlovsk Oblast. At the Magnitogorsk Combine, the smelting of armor steel in open-hearth furnaces was first mastered and extended to other plants. During the war years, the Izhevsky Metallurgical Plant mastered the smelting of 19 new grades of steel, and for the first time applied stamping of breeches and planting of barrels on horizontal forging machines. At the Pervouralsk Novotrubny plant, reinforced with evacuated equipment from Ukrainian factories, during the war, 5 new workshops were built and the production of 129 types of pipes was mastered. At Uralvagonzavod, Uralmash, and the Chelyabinsk Tractor Plant, the production of tanks was launched in the shortest possible time. In Sverdlovsk, and Ust-Katav, from the framework of the evacuated equipment, the production of artillery pieces and shells was built, supplementing the potential of the Motovilikhinsky, Zlatoust, and Izhevsky arms factories.

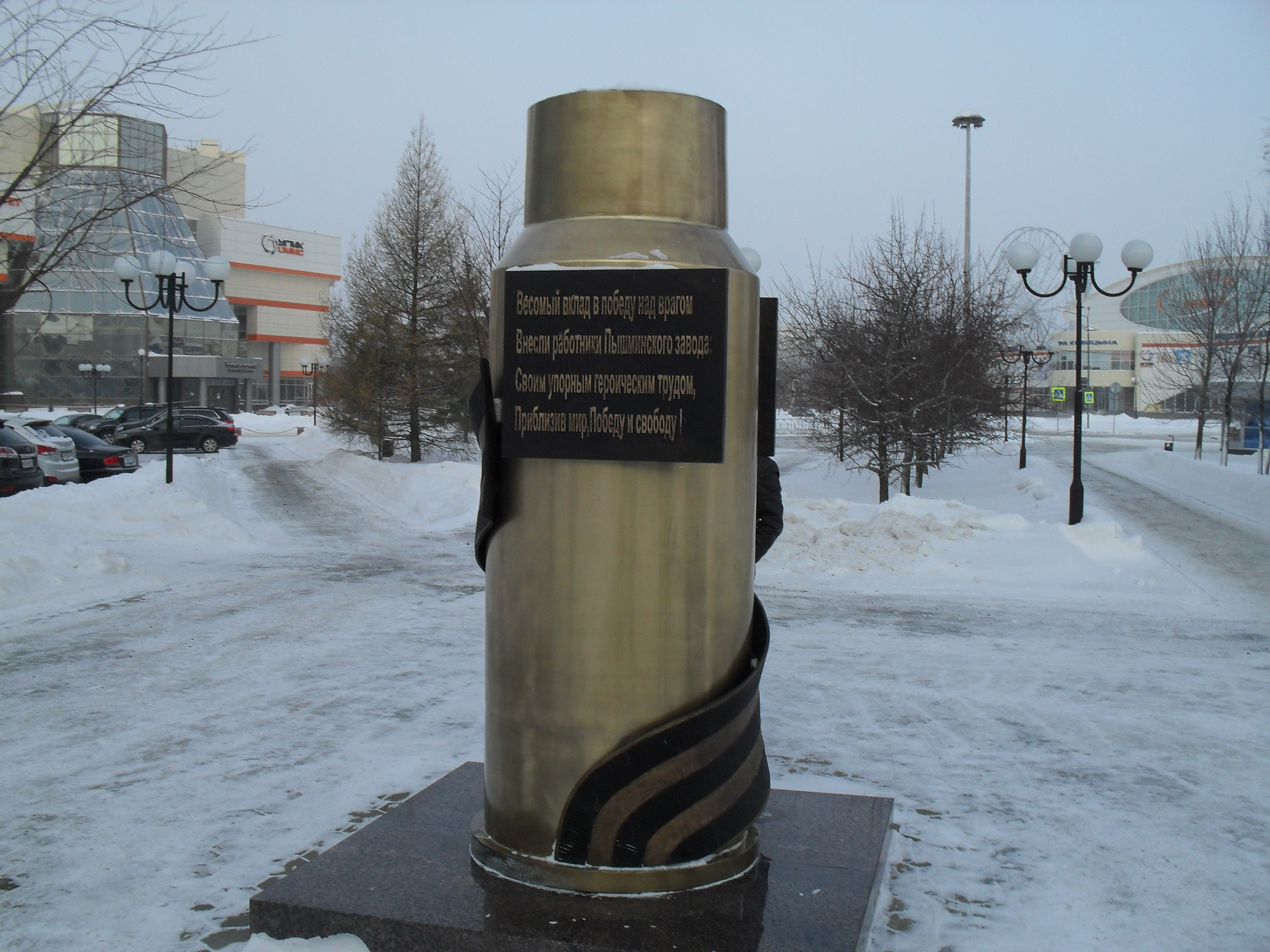
UMMC bomb shell, Uralelektromed.

Due to the expansion of the Ural Aluminum Plant, the volume of aluminum production increased during the war years from 13.3 to 71.5 thousand tons. In 1942, UAZ produced 100% of aluminum in the USSR. About 80% of all shell and cartridge cases during the war years were made of copper smelted by the Pyshminsky plant. The South Ural Nickel Plant significantly increased the production of nickel and cobalt. The Chelyabinsk Zinc Plant provided 75% of zinc supplies by the end of the war. At the Solikamsk Magnesium Plant, the design capacity was closed 4.5 times due to the addition of evacuated equipment. On July 22, 1943, the first magnesium was produced by the Bereznikovsky Plant, having been completed in a short time because of a simplification of the project. Evacuated equipment spread to Revda, Kamensk-Uralsky, Verkhnyaya Salda, and Orsk. Plants for the processing of non-ferrous metals and the production of aluminum and magnesium alloys were created. In 1942, the Kirovgrad Hard Alloys Plant was commissioned, which began to produce hard alloy armor-piercing cores for shells and cartridges. In March 1942, the Kamensk-Uralsky Foundry was launched, which throughout the war was the only enterprise that produced aircraft wheels.

During the Great Patriotic War, the scientific potential of the Urals was strengthened by evacuated institutes. The Academy of Sciences of the USSR was located in Sverdlovsk. Academicians I. P. Bardin and M. A. Pavlov made a great contribution to the development of Ural metallurgy during the war years. Geological research in the Urals was led by A. N. Zavaritsky, D. V. Nalivkin, and V. I. Luchitsky. Academician L. D. Shevyakov made a significant contribution to the development of the Ural coal industry. V. V. Wolf developed and introduced a new method of processing Ural bauxite. N. S. Siunov invented a transformer to improve welding performance. A. E. Malakhov discovered new cobalt deposits. P. S. Mamykin was engaged in the development of new refractory materials.

In general, up to 90% of iron ore, 70% of manganese, and 100% of aluminum, nickel, chromium, and platinum were produced in the Urals during the war years. Pig iron production increased by 88.4%, steel by 65.5%, rolled metal production by 54.9%, rough copper by 59.9%, electrolytic copper by 94.8%, nickel by 186.5%, aluminum by 554.1%, and cobalt by 1782.1%. The volume of production of defense equipment has grown sixfold. In total, the Urals produced about 40% of all military products of the country: 70% of all tanks (including 60% of medium and 100% of heavy), 50% of artillery pieces, and 50% of ammunition.

=== Post-war era ===
After the war, the engineers evacuated from the western regions returned to their native places, which led to a shortage of engineering and technical personnel at Ural enterprises. Also, the Urals experienced a lack of funding for the reconversion of factories, since the bulk of the funds were directed to the restoration of areas liberated from occupation. At most factories in the region, the equipment required repair and updating. The equipment coming to the Urals on account of reparations from Germany and other aggressor countries was outdated and worn out.

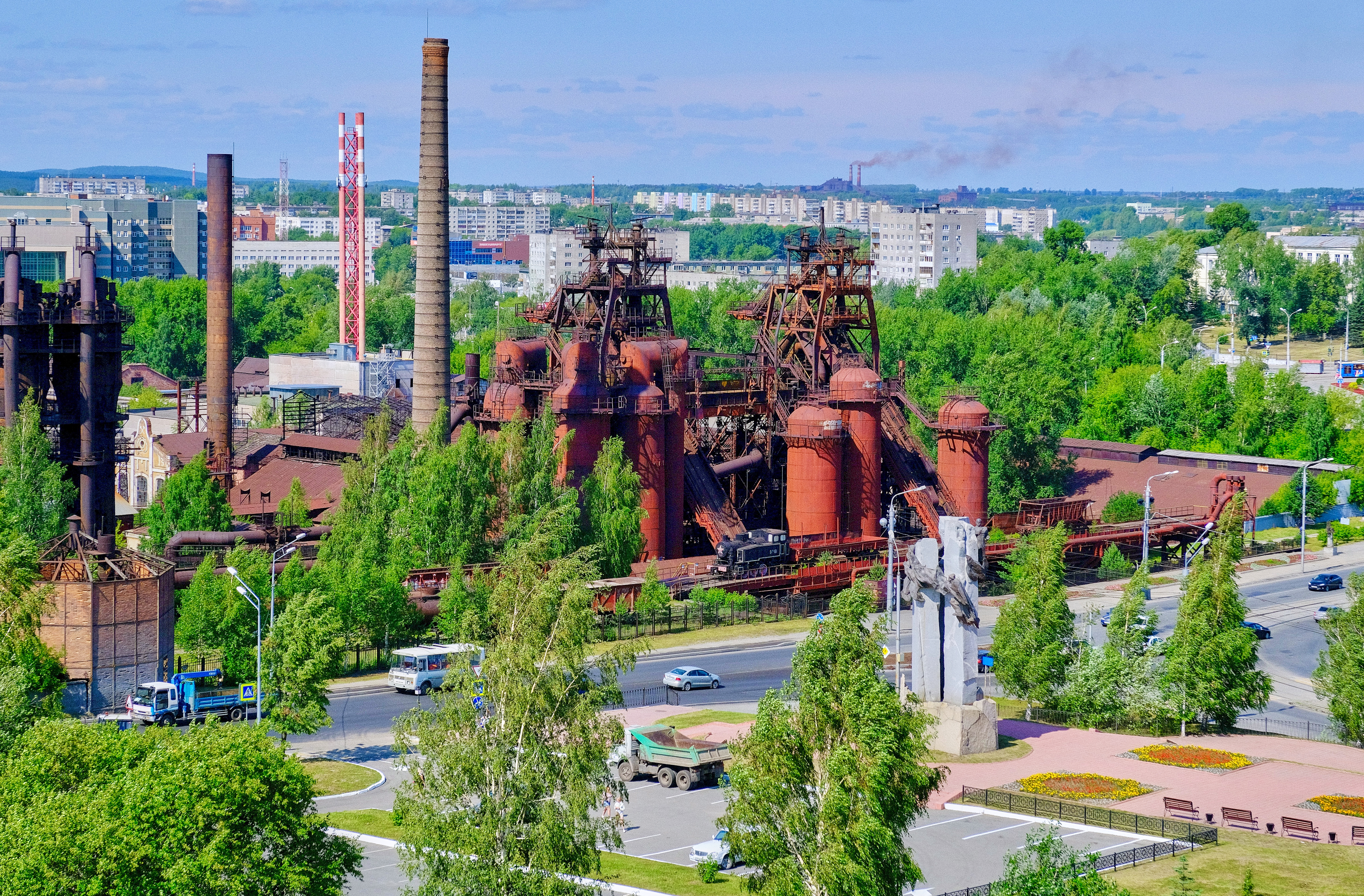
Workshops of the former Nizhny Tagil Plant, closed in 1987. Now it is a Factory-museum.

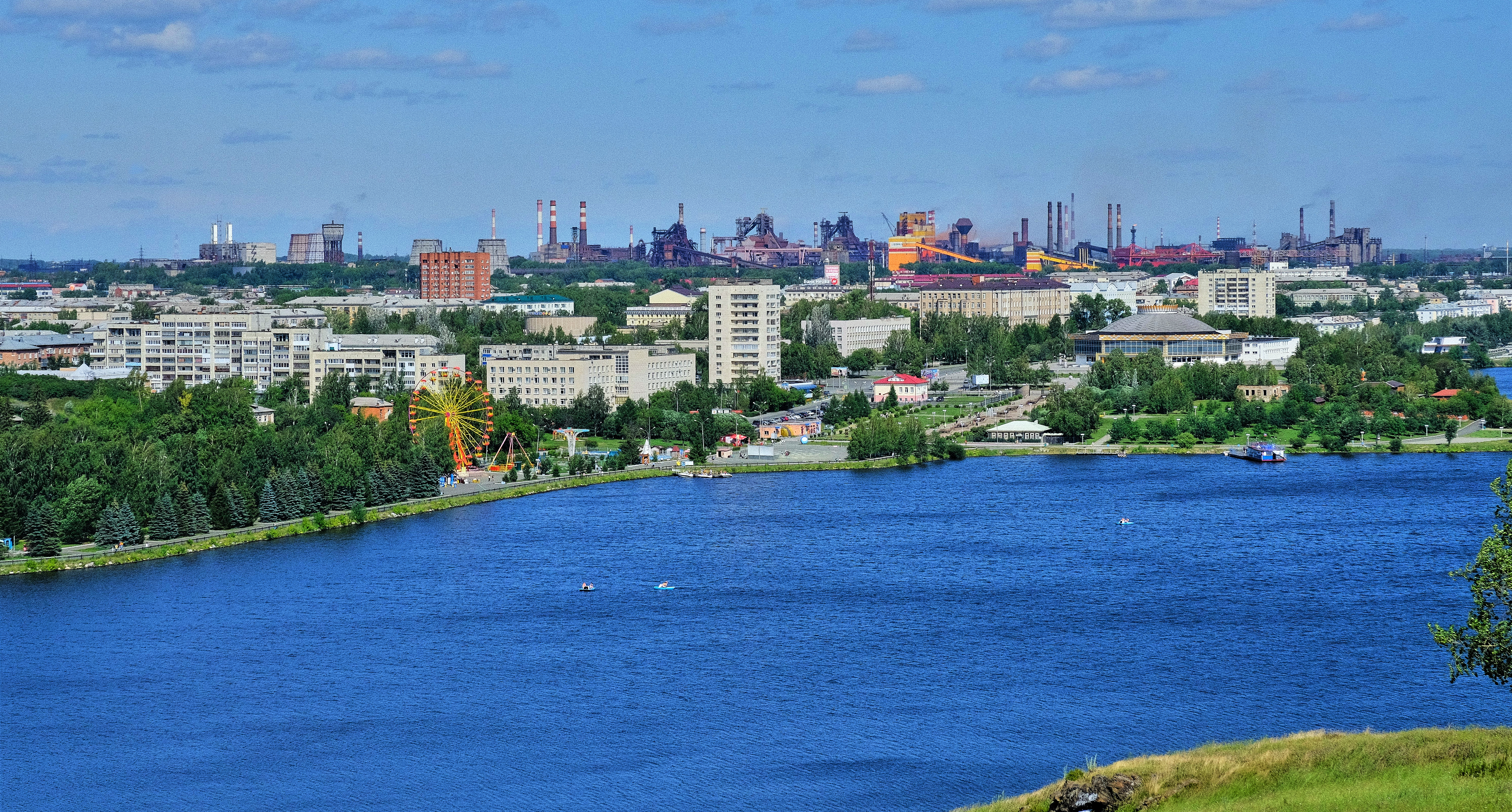
Panorama of Nizhny Tagil and the Nizhny Tagil (Novo Tagil) Metallurgical Plant.

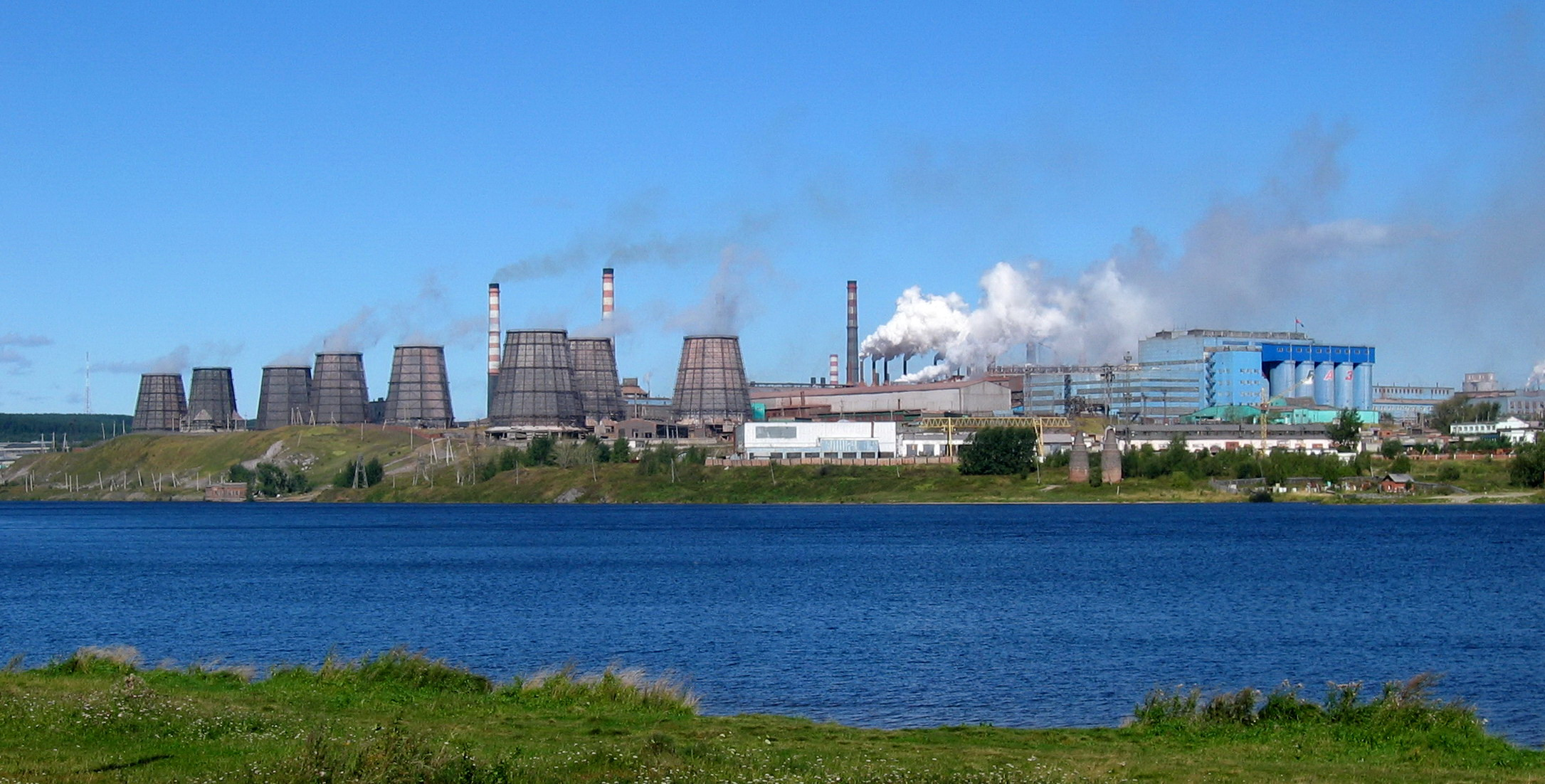
Panorama of the Bogoslovsky Aluminum Plant.

The restructuring of the Ural metallurgy for the production of peacetime assortment was completed in 1946. Replacement and reconstruction of technological lines was often accompanied by a decrease in the quality of products due to untrained personnel and organizational problems. Since 1948, there has been a steady increase in production volumes. The construction of the Orsko-Khalilovsky Metallurgical Plant was continued, the capacities of the Magnitogorsk, Novotagilsky, Chelyabinsk, Chusovsky, and Lysvensky plants increased. The development of jet aviation, the nuclear industry, rocket engineering, and cosmonautics in the post-war period created the need for high-alloy steels, non-ferrous metal products, and the requirements for the quality of metals also sharply increased.

The main directions of technical progress in ferrous metallurgy in the post-war period were:

- further increase in the volume of blast furnaces and open-hearth furnaces
- increasing the share of steel smelting in electric furnaces and converters
- mechanization and automation of production processes
- the use of oxygen-enriched blast
- the use of natural gas as fuel
- mastering continuous and semi-continuous rolling
- introduction of continuous casting of steel

In April 1959, the Magnitogorsk Iron and Steel Works began heating open-hearth furnaces with associated gas. By the end of the 1960s, more than 80% of steel was smelted in furnaces using natural gas. Since 1956, at the Nizhny Tagil Metallurgical Plant, and later at all Ural plants, oxygen enrichment began to be used, which made it possible to increase the productivity of open-hearth furnaces by 15-25% and reduce specific fuel consumption by 15-20%. In the 1960s, more than 60% of open-hearth steel and 72% of electric steel were smelted using oxygen.

In the copper-smelting industry, the mechanization of cleaning tuyeres and loading furnaces, and automation of units were introduced. These measures made it possible to almost double the production of copper at the Krasnouralsk and Kirovgrad copper-smelting plants. Due to the introduction of the roasting of copper charge and zinc concentrates in a fluidized bed at the Chelyabinsk Zinc Plant, zinc production increased, and the integrated use of raw materials was improved. At the Ufaleisk Nickel Plant, sulfation roasting of nickel matte was introduced; at the Karabash Plant, a system for automation of the thermal regime of reverberatory furnaces was introduced, which made it possible to increase the production of nickel and copper. At the Ural aluminum smelter, a continuous bauxite leaching process was developed, and two-tier thickeners were installed, which increased the production of alumina.

The restoration and development of metallurgy in the Urals in the post-war period was stimulated by a significant increase in capital investments. In 1961–1970, out of 2,457 million rubles of capital investments in metallurgy, 2,074 million rubles (84.4%) were invested in five enterprises: Magnitogorsk Iron and Steel Works - 752 million rubles (30.6%), Chelyabinsk Metallurgical Plant - 610 million rubles (24.8%), Nizhniy Tagil Iron and Steel Works - 401 million rubles (16.3%), Orsko-Khalilovskiy Iron and Steel Works - 230 million rubles (9.4%), Verkh-Isetsky Iron and Steel Works - 81 million rubles (3.3%). From 1946 to 1965, 4 blast furnaces, 6 coke oven batteries, 14 open-hearth furnaces, 6 rolling shops were built and launched at the Magnitogorsk Iron and Steel Works. From 1947 to 1959, 4 blast furnaces, 18 open-hearths, 6 rolling mills, a unique converter shop for processing vanadium pig iron, (Note: At NTMK, vanadium is extracted from cast iron in two stages: the first melting is in a converter to produce vanadium slag, which is later used for the production of vanadium and ferrovanadium oxides, and a semi-finished product; the second melting is in a converter to produce steel alloyed with residual vanadium and final slag.) and the country's first continuous casting machine were built at the Nizhniy Tagil Metallurgical Plant from 1947 to 1959. During the same period, blast furnaces, open-hearths, and electric furnaces were built and reconstructed at the Chelyabinsk Metallurgical Plant, and a sinter plant, electric steel-making shops No. 1 and No. 2, sheet-rolling, crimping, and section-rolling shops were put into operation. In 1950, a by-product coke plant was launched at the Orsko-Khalilovsky Metallurgical Plant; in 1955-1963 - 3 blast furnaces; in 1958-1966 - 9 open-hearth furnaces, blooming and sheet rolling mills. In 1950, the Magnitogorsk, Nizhniy Tagil and Chelyabinsk Combines smelted a total of 71.6% of all Ural pig iron, 53.4% of steel, and 57.1% of rolled products. Although the level of technical equipment of the Ural metallurgical plants was lower than in other regions, the cost of iron and steel produced was 10-15% less than the average for the USSR Ministry of Ferrous Metallurgy.

To cover the shortage of iron ore, supplies of ore from the Sokolovsko-Sarbaisky Plant in Kazakhstan began in 1957, and from the 1960s from the mines of the Kursk Magnetic Anomaly and the Kola Peninsula. At Vysokogorsky Mining and Processing Plant, the Magnetitovaya, Operational, and Yuzhnaya mines were commissioned in 1949–1954 to mine deep horizons. In 1963, the Kachkanarsky Mining and Processing Plant was put into operation, extracting iron ore with a relatively low (15-16%) iron content, but containing valuable vanadium, which significantly increases the strength properties of steel. To provide copper ore raw materials in the late 1950s - early 1960s, the Gaysky and Uchalinsky mining and processing plants were built. The main supplier of the Ural aluminum raw materials in the post-war years was the North Ural bauxite mines. The Bogoslovsky and Uralsky aluminum plants in 1949-1953 carried out the reconstruction of production facilities and mastered new technological processes.

Production of ferrous metals in the Urals by year and by thousand tons.
| Year | Iron | Ural share of the USSR % | Steel | Ural share of the USSR % | Rolled products | Ural share of the USSR % |
|---|---|---|---|---|---|---|
| 1940 | 2714.3 | 18.2 | 3924.3 | 21.4 | 2827.9 | 21.6 |
| 1945 | 5113 | 58.1 | 6494 | 53.0 | 4382 | 59.6 |
| 1950 | 7076 | 36.9 | 10 505 | 38.4 | 7583 | 42.2 |
| 1955 | 11 721 | 35.2 | 16 087 | 35.5 | 12 313 | 40.3 |
| 1960 | 15 003 | 32.1 | 21 596 | 33.1 | 16 154 | 31.7 |
| 1965 | 18 800 | 28.3 | 29 400 | 32.3 | 22 200 | 35.9 |
| 1970 | 23 079 | 26.9 | 33 483 | 32.0 | 26 651 | 30.1 |
| 1975 | 27 900 | 27.1 | 42 600 | 30.2 | 29 000 | 29.4 |
| 1980 | 28 495 | 26.7 | 40 849 | 30.3 | 33 542 | 29.6 |
| 1985 | 28 200 | 25.6 | 44 600 | 28.8 | 31 600 | 29.2 |
| 1990 | 27 200 | 24.5 | 43 600 | 26.1 | 32 500 | 27.5 |

In the 1950s and 1960s, a massive reconstruction of the Verkhnesaldinsky Metallurgical Plant was carried out with the transition to the production of semi-finished products from titanium alloys. The area of the plant was increased by 5 times. The world's largest press with a force of 75 thousand tons was installed for stamping slabs. Rolling, forging, and stamping shops were built. Since 1966, the production of small diameter pipes has been mastered at cold rolling mills. After reconstruction, the plant became the world's largest producer of titanium and aluminum alloys.

In the 1970s, reconstruction and refit of the Ural ferrous metallurgy enterprises were carried out. At the Kachkanarsky Mining and Processing Plant, for the first time in the Urals, the production of iron ore pellets was started, at the Nizhny Tagil Metallurgical Plant — wide flange beams, at the Chelyabinsk Metallurgical Plant — stainless steel sheets, at the Magnitogorsk Metallurgical Plant - bent profiles, and at the Verkh-Isetsky Plant — cold-rolled transformer sheets. The Ural Plant of Precision Alloys was built. The deposits of the region provided only 50% of iron ore raw materials for metallurgical plants during this period. Steelmaking in the 1970s developed through the introduction of out-of-furnace steel processing, reconstruction of open-hearth furnaces into two-shaft furnaces, and increasing the capacity of converters. Demand from the engineering and oil industries contributed to the expansion of pipe rolling enterprises. In 1975, the Sinarsky Pipe Plant launched pipe rolling shop No. 2, which produced drill pipes. In December 1976, a pipe rolling shop was launched at the Seversky Pipe Plant. At the Pervouralsky Novotrubny Plant in 1976, for the first time in the country, the production of stainless steel pipes for the nuclear industry was mastered. About 65% of Ural steel pipes were produced by the Chelyabinsk Pipe Rolling Plant, the Sinarsky Pipe Plant was the largest producer of cast iron pipes in the country. In general, Ural plants produced more than 33% of all pipes produced in the USSR. In 1980, Ural metallurgical plants smelted 28.6 million tons of pig iron, which became an absolute historical record for the region.

In 1990, Ural metallurgy accounted for the production of 24.5% of all-Union cast iron, 26.1% of steel, 27.5% of rolled products, and 30.7% of steel pipes. In the last years of the existence of the USSR, in the Ural metallurgical industry, problems with an outdated equipment park and extensive development based on outdated technologies have become aggravated. The proportion of obsolete equipment in ferrous metallurgy was estimated at 57%, in non-ferrous - 70%. About 90% of the equipment of blast furnace shops and 85% of the equipment of rolling shops in the Urals by the early 1990s had a service life of more than 20–25 years. In 1985, the share of open-hearth steel in total production in the Urals was 78.2%, while in Western countries and in Japan in the 1980s, environmentally dirty open-hearth production was discontinued. The problem of environmental pollution has significantly worsened. The surroundings of the Karabash plant have become an ecological disaster zone. There were 0.2 million hectares (200,000 hectares = 494,210.76 acres) of land that were dumps and slurry pits.

=== After the collapse of the USSR ===
There are three stages in the post-Soviet history of Ural metallurgy:

- 1991-1994 - adaptation to market conditions, search for sources of raw materials and sales markets, accumulation of working capital.
- 1994-2003 - formation of vertically integrated companies and their development.
- since 2003 - modernization of enterprises within vertically integrated companies.

Restructuring and the transition to market conditions led to a 2-fold reduction in production at the Ural metallurgical enterprises. The Nizhniy Tagil and Orsko-Khalilovsky plants went bankrupt. Some enterprises went through bankruptcy proceedings several times. The privatization and corporatization of the enterprises of the Ural metallurgy were completed in 1992–1994. In the late 1990s - early 2000s, vertically integrated structures began to form around large enterprises, including all stages of a closed technological cycle. In addition to the Magnitogorsk Metallurgical Combine, the MMK Group includes: the Magnitogorsk Hardware, Metallurgical, and Calibration Plants; the Mechel group united the Chelyabinsk Metallurgical Plant, Yuzhuralnickel, Beloretsk Metallurgical Plant, Izhstal, and Korshunovsky Mining and Processing Plant; NTMK and Kachkanarsky Mining and Processing Plant, together with the West Siberian and Kuznetsk metallurgical plants, entered Evraz-holding; Chelyabinsk Pipe Rolling Plant and Pervouralsk Novotrubny Plants were merged into the ChTPZ Group; copper smelters became part of UMMC and Russian Copper Company; aluminum - Rusal and SUAL, united in 2007.

The main directions of development of ferrous metallurgy in the Urals in the market conditions were the reconstruction of blast furnaces with optimization of the profile and process control systems, the replacement of open-hearth furnaces with oxygen converters and electric furnaces, the widespread introduction of out-of-furnace steel processing, evacuation of steel before casting, as well as an increase in the share of continuous casting of steel. From 1985 to 2000, the share of the Ural steel smelted by the open-hearth method decreased from 78.2% to 46.9%; the share of converter steel in the same period increased from 15% to 46.9%, the share of continuously cast steel - from 1.2% to 33.1%. The share of electric steel in the same period remained at the level of about 6-7%.

After the reconstruction and launch of new capacities, about 85% of the Ural steel was produced at the 4 largest metallurgical plants: MMK (39.1% of the total steel volume in 2006), NTMK (17.6%), Mechel (15.2% ), and Ural steel (11.4%).

In the late 20th - early 21st century, the Ural metallurgical plants are developing taking into account the interests of holding structures. The main directions of development are the automation of production and the minimization of costs. Key investment development projects are the reconstruction of the converter shop and the construction of a pulverized coal injection unit at NTMK in 2010–2012, the launch in 2010 of the "Vysota 239" large-diameter pipe production shop at ChTPZ, as well as the launch in 2009 of Mill-5000 at MMK, which supplies workpieces including for the new ChelPipe workshop. By 2014, the share of Ural steel processed by the out-of-furnace method and poured at the continuous casting machine was brought to 100%.

In 2008, the Ural plants produced 43.1% of all-Russian pig iron, 43.4% of steel, 43.4% of rolled products, 46.4% of pipes, 47.9% of hardware, 72.8% of ferroalloys, about 80% of bauxite, 60% of alumina, 36% of refined copper, 100% of titanium and magnesium alloys, 64% of zinc, 15% of lead, and 8% of aluminum. The largest contribution to the metallurgy of the region is made by enterprises of the Chelyabinsk and Sverdlovsk Oblasts. As of 2013, the contribution of the Ural enterprises was estimated at 38% of steel and rolled products and about 50% of steel pipes.

== See also ==
- Metallurgical plants of the Urals
- History of production and use of iron

== Bibliography ==
=== Publications ===
- Алексеев [in Russian]; Гаврилов [in Russian] (2008). Металлургия Урала с древнейших времён до наших дней. М.: Nauka (publisher). p. 886. ISBN 978-5-02-036731-9.
- Баньковский Л. История и экология: очерки об истоках исторической гидрогеографии — Соликамск: 2008. — 356 с. — ISBN 978-5-89469-055-1 — OTRS — Книга доступна по лицензии CC BY-SA 4.0, 3.0
- Барбот де Марни Е. Н. Урал и его богатства. — Yekaterinburg, типография газеты «Уральская жизнь»: Издание П. И. Певина, 1910. — 413 с.
- Барышников М. Н. Деловой мир России: историко-биографический справочник. — СПб.: Искусство-СПБ, 1998. — 448 с. — 5000 экз. — ISBN 5-210-01503-3.
- Белов В. Д. Исторический очерк уральских горных заводов / Выс. утв. Постоян. совещат. контора железозаводчиков. — СПб.: Типография Исидора Гольдберга, 1896. — 177 с.
- Валериус Б. Металлургия чугуна. Переведено и дополнено В. Ковригиным / Учёный комитет Корпуса горных инженеров. — СПб.: Типография Иосафата Огризко, 1862. — 687 с.
- Васильев Г. А., Никитин Д. И., Новиков И. А. Металлургия Южного Урала: история и современность. — Челябинск: ГБУ ДПО «Челябинский институт ГБУ ДПО «Челябинский институт переподготовки и повышения квалификации работников образования», 2018. — 112 с. — 100 экз. — ISBN 978-5-503-00345-1.
- Гаврилов Д. В. Горнозаводский Урал XVII—XX вв.: Избранные труды — Екатеринбург: УрО РАН, 2005. — 616 с. — ISBN 5-89516-172-3
- Georg Wilhelm de Gennin, Описание Уральских и Сибирских заводов. 1735 — М.: Государственное издательство «История заводов», 1937. — 691 с.
- Гудков Г. Ф., Гудкова З. И. Из истории южноуральских горных заводов XVIII—XIX веков : Историко-краеведческие очерки. — Уфа : Башкирское книжное издательство, 1985. — Т. Часть 1. — 424 с. — 5000 экз.
- Alexei Ivanov (writer), Горнозаводская цивилизация — М.: АСТ, 2014. — 283 с. — 4000 экз. — ISBN 978-5-17-079642-7
- Карабасов Ю. С., Черноусов П. И., Коротченко Н. А., Голубев О. В. Металлургия и время : Энциклопедия : в 6 т. — М. : Издательский Дом МИСиС, 2011. — Т. 2 : Фундамент индустриальной цивилизации. Возрождение и Новое время Archived 2021-11-09 at the Wayback Machine. — 216 с. — 1000 экз. — ISBN 978-5-87623-537-4 (т. 2).
- Карабасов Ю. С., Черноусов П. И., Коротченко Н. А., Голубев О. В. Металлургия и время : Энциклопедия : в 6 т. — М. : Издательский Дом МИСиС, 2012. — Т. 4 : Русский вклад. — 232 с. — 1000 экз. — ISBN 978-5-87623-539-8 (т. 4).
- Карабасов Ю. С., Черноусов П. И., Коротченко Н. А., Голубев О. В. Металлургия и время : Энциклопедия : в 6 т. — М. : Издательский Дом МИСиС, 2014. — Т. 6 : Металлургия и социум. Взаимное влияние и развитие. — 224 с. — 1000 экз. — ISBN 978-5-87623-760-6 (т. 6).
- Кашинцев Д. А. История металлургии Урала / под ред. академика М. А. Павлова. — М., Л.: Государственное объединенное научно-техническое издательство, Редакция литературы по чёрной и цветной металлургии, 1939. — Т. 1 (и единственный): Первобытная эпоха XVII и XVIII веков. — 293 с. — 2000 экз.
- Кириллов В. М., Корепанов Н. С., Микитюк В. П., Дашкевич Л. А. Немцы на Урале XVII—XXI вв.: Коллективная монография — Nizhny Tagil: НТГСПА, 2009. — 288 с. — 200 экз. — ISBN 978-5-8299-0122-6
- Лоранский А. М. Краткий исторический очерк административных учреждений горного ведомства в России 1700—1900 гг.. — СПб.: Типография инж. Г. А. Бернштейна, 1900. — 207 с.
- Лотарёва Р. М. Города-заводы России : XVIII — первая половина XIX века. — Екатеринбург : Издательство «Сократ», 2011. — 288 с., 16 с. ил. — 1000 экз. — ISBN 978-5-88664-372-5.
- Неклюдов Е. Г. Горная реформа в России второй половины XIX — начала XX века: От замысла к реализации / под ред. Г. Е. Корнилов — СПб.: Нестор-История, 2018. — 576 с. — 300 экз. — ISBN 978-5-4469-1344-2
- Павленко Н. И. История металлургии в России XVIII века : Заводы и заводовладельцы / отв. ред. А. А. Новосельский. — М. : Nauka (publisher), 1962. — 566 с. — 2000 экз.
- Stanislav Strumilin, История чёрной металлургии в СССР / под ред. Ivan Bardin — М.: Nauka (publisher), 1954. — Т. 1-й (и единственный). Феодальный период (1500—1860 гг.). — 533 с. — 5000 экз.
- Струмилин С. Г. Очерки экономической истории России и СССР. — М.: Наука, 1966. — 512 с. — 2500 экз.
- Хью Хадсон-мл. Первые Демидовы и развитие чёрной металлургии России в XVIII веке = The rise of the Demidov Family and the Russian iron industry in the eighteenth century / пер. с англ. И. В. Кучумова, отв. ред. И. Н. Юркин. — 2-е, исправленное и дополненное. — СПб.: ООО «Своё издательство», 2014. — 116 с. — (Башкортостан в зарубежных исследованиях). — 150 экз. — ISBN 978-5-4386-0282-8.
- Екатеринбург : Энциклопедия / глав. ред. В. В. Маслаков. — Екатеринбург : Издательство «Академкнига», 2002. — 728 с. — 3900 экз. — ISBN 5-93472-068-6.
- История Урала с древнейших времён до 1861 года / под ред. А. А. Преображенский — М.: Nauka (publisher), 1989. — 608 с. — 4100 экз. — ISBN 5-02-009432-3
- История Урала / Под общ. ред. И. С. Капцуговича. — 2-е изд. — Пермь : Пермское книжное издательство, 1976. — Т. 1. Первобытнообщинный строй. Период феодализма. Период капитализма. / ред. тома В. В. Мухин. — 396 с. — 5000 экз.
- История Урала с древнейших времён до конца XIX века / под ред. акад. Б. В. Личмана. — Екатеринбург: СВ-96, 1997. — 448 с. — 5000 экз. — ISBN 5-89516-035-2.
- История Урала: XX век / под. ред. Б. В. Личмана, В. Д. Камынина. — Екатеринбург: СВ-96, 1998. — 432 с. — 5000 экз. — ISBN 5-89516-036-0.
- Металлургические заводы Урала XVII—XX вв.: Энциклопедия / глав. ред. В. В. Алексеев. — Екатеринбург : Издательство «Академкнига», 2001. — 536 с. — 1000 экз. — ISBN 5-93472-057-0.
- Очерки истории техники в России с древнейших времён до 60-х годов XIX века / Председатель редколлегии И. И. Артоболевский. — М.: Наука, 1978. — 374 с. — 7550 экз.

=== Articles ===
- Васина Т. А. Формирование горнозаводских округов в конце XVIII — первой половине XIX веков на территории современной Удмуртии // Научный диалог — 2019. — вып. 7. — С. 222–239. — ISSN 2227-1295 — doi:10.24224/2227-1295-2019-7-222-239
- Запарий В. В. создания металлургии на Урале // Историко-экономические исследования : журнал. — Иркутск: Федеральное государственное бюджетное образовательное учреждение высшего образования «Байкальский государственный университет», 2015. — Т. 16, No. 2. — С. 349–365. — ISSN 2308-2488. — doi:10.17150/2308-2588.2015.16(2).349-365.
- Запарий В. В. Металлургия Урала в эпоху потрясений Первая мировая и Гражданская войны // Историко-экономические исследования : журнал. — Иркутск: Федеральное государственное бюджетное образовательное учреждение высшего образования «Байкальский государственный университет», 2015. — Т. 16, No. 1. — С. 67–108. — ISSN 2308-2488. — doi:10.17150/2308-2588.2015.16(1).67-108.
- Запарий В. В. Петровская модернизация и металлургия Урала (1700–1725) // Историко-экономические исследования : журнал. — Иркутск: Федеральное государственное бюджетное образовательное учреждение высшего образования «Байкальский государственный университет», 2016. — Т. 17, No. 1. — С. 95–140. — ISSN 2308-2488. — doi:10.17150/2308-2588.2016.17(1).95-140.
- Мударисов Р. З. К вопросу о кризисе горнозаводской промышленности Южного Урала в первой половине XIX века // Урал индустриальный. Бакунинские чтения. Индустриальная модернизация России в XVIII–XXI вв.: материалы XIII Всероссийской научной конференции, Екатеринбург, 18—19 октября 2018 г.: в 2-х томах. — Екатеринбург: УрО РАН, 2018. — Т. 1. — С. 63–72. — ISBN 978-5-7691-2504-1.
- Пыхалов И. В. Развитие чёрной металлургии в Российской империи // Проблемы современной экономики : журнал. — СПб.: ООО «Научно-производственная компания «РОСТ», 2017. — No. 1 (61). — С. 95–140. — ISSN 1818-3395.
