= Coal in Europe =

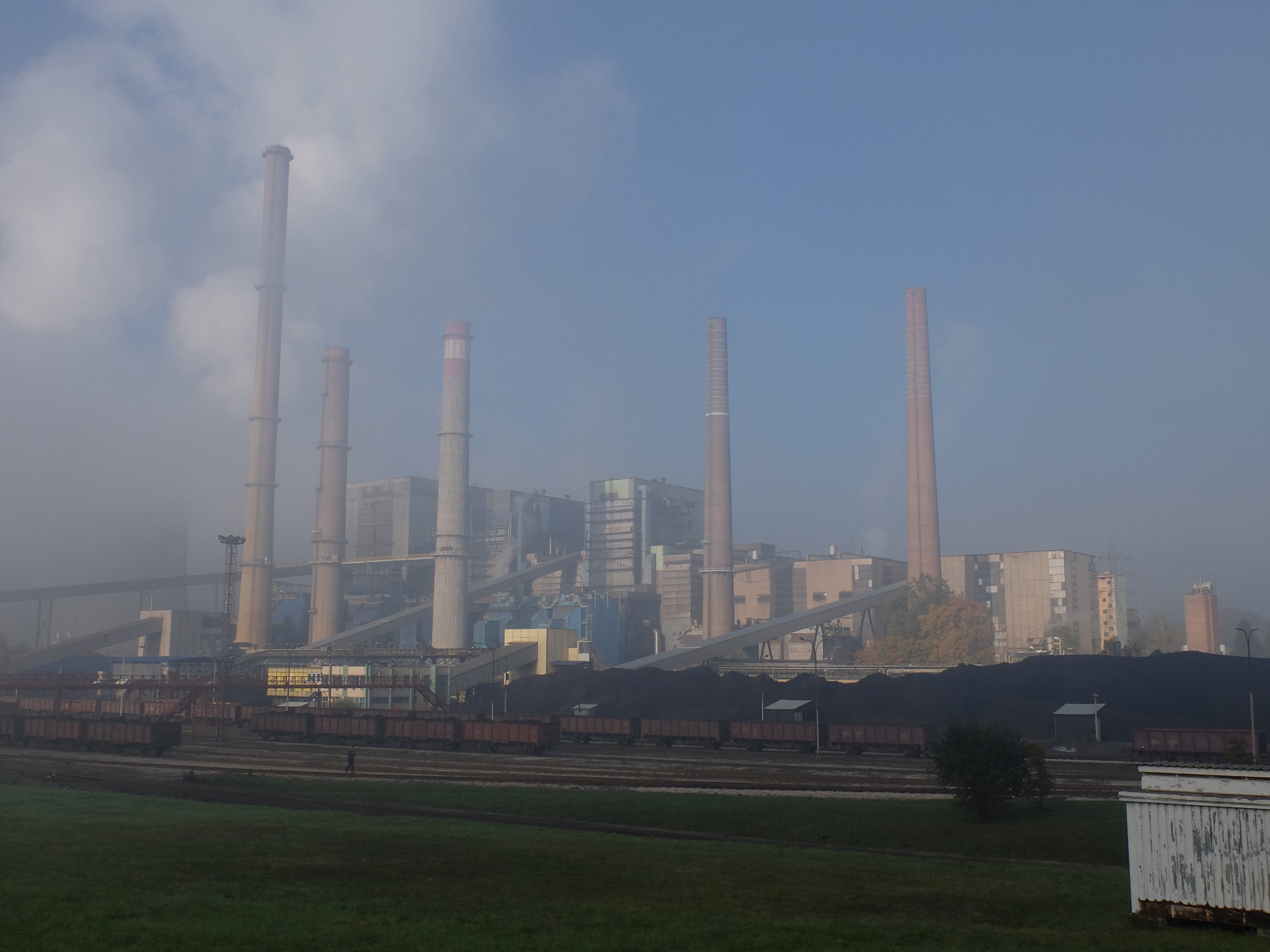
Tuzla Thermal Power Plant in Bosnia and Herzegovina

Coal in Europe is a term describing the use of coal as an energy source in Europe, including both thermal coal used for power generation and coking coal used for steel production.

Coal power generation in the European Union (EU) has decreased by almost one-third since 2012, consistent with their commitment to reduce CO2 emissions by 55% by 2030 and achieve climate neutrality by 2050. These decarbonisation efforts have prioritized a transition away from coal in favor of renewable energy and carbon capture technologies, which has led to the close of mines and power plants in EU coal regions. In 2023, fuel made from coal constituted 13% of the EU's electricity generation.

Despite a 4.3% increase in the EU's coal consumption in 2022 alongside an all-time high globally, the International Energy Agency (IEA) predicted that the demand for coal would decrease in the majority of advanced economies in 2023 with any subsequent rise unlikely to occur again. The largest declines in consumption are anticipated in the EU and the United States with a reduction of around 20% in 2023.

== Coal supply in the EU ==
According to the International Energy Agency, the EU28 countries' use of coal as fuel decreased from 5,289 terawatt hours (TWh) in 1990 to 3,057 TWh in 2015, a reduction of 42%. During the same period, global coal use increased by 73%.

EU28's use of coal in each year (in TWh)
Year	1990	1995	2000	2005	2010	2015
Energy use	5289	4246	3735	3702	3293	3057

=== Coal types ===
Coal types include anthracite, bituminous coal, lignite, and peat. Coal from fields differ in ash and moisture content, energy value, volatile elements, sulphur content, and other properties. Anthracite and bituminous coal are of relatively high value compared to lignite and peat, which have lower energy and higher moisture content. Coal is often used in the iron and steel industries or to produce energy.

== Production and import ==
Russia (365 Mt), Germany (176 Mt), and Poland (131 Mt) are the largest producers of coal in Europe as of 2016. The largest net importer was Germany with 53 Mt, and the largest net exporter was Russia with 147 Mt. The countries with the largest electricity production from coal in 2016 were Germany (284 TWh), Russia (159 TWh), and Poland (133 TWh).

== Electricity ==
In 2020, think-tank Carbon Tracker estimated that over 80% of coal-fired plants were already more expensive than new renewable counterparts and that by 2025, they all would be.

== Transition away from coal in the EU ==
The European Commission launched the Coal Regions in Transition Initiative (CRiT) in 2017 to assist coal, peat, and oil shale regions in the EU during their transition to renewable energy sources. It is an initiative that provides a platform for dialogue among governments, businesses, trade unions, NGOs, and academia, promoting the exchange of knowledge and experiences. CRiT engages with related efforts and supports region-specific adaptations to the energy transition, such as in the Western Balkans and Ukraine. In collaboration with the Just Transition Platform, CRiT aims to support communities transitioning away from carbon-intensive energy sources.

Over the past decade, coal emissions in the EU have decreased by 40%. This reduction aligns with the goals of the EU Emissions Trading System (EU-ETS), which limits greenhouse gas emissions from industries in the EU. However, in 2022, the ten most polluting power plants in Europe were coal-based, primarily located in Poland and Germany. Together, their emissions were two-thirds of the total EU-ETS coal emissions. While Germany aims to phase out coal by 2030, Poland has not set a timeline for transitioning away from coal and has seen an increase in its share of EU-ETS coal power sector emissions.

Germany has the highest number of coal plants in Europe, and its 53 EU-ETS coal plants were responsible for over 180 million tonnes of CO_{2} emissions in 2022, making Germany the largest emitter in the EU. But Poland, despite emitting 60 million tonnes less than Germany and having 42 EU-ETS member facilities, is the most coal-reliant of any EU nation. Coal comprises 70% of Poland's electricity generation compared to only 10% for Germany. Germany's commitment to transition away from fossil fuels and opposition to coal subsidies is supported by its strong economy and government funding, but Poland faces economic hurdles, as its GDP per capita is less than half of Germany's. Other coal-reliant nations like the Czech Republic and Bulgaria highlight the complexity of transitioning to renewable energy while ensuring economic stability and energy security.

In February 2024, the European Commission approved a €300 million Polish scheme to aid workers affected by the closure of coal- and lignite-fired power plants and mines. The scheme offers one-year severance payments and paid leave for employees nearing retirement. It aligns with EU State aid rules and supports EU Green Deal objectives.

== Opposition ==
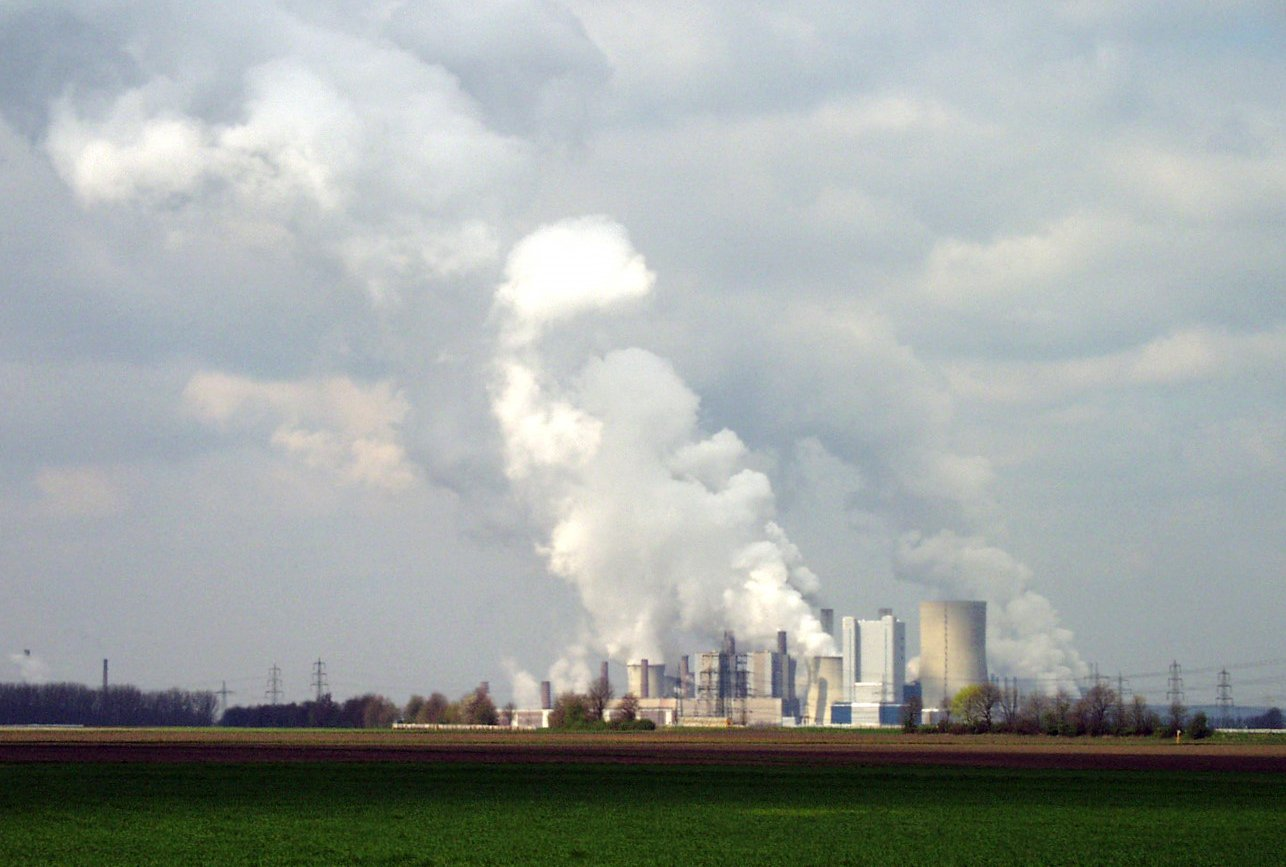
WWF ranked Niederaußem lignite power plant by RWE in Köln as the most polluting power plant in Germany in 2007 with relative emissions of 1.200 g CO_{2}/kWh

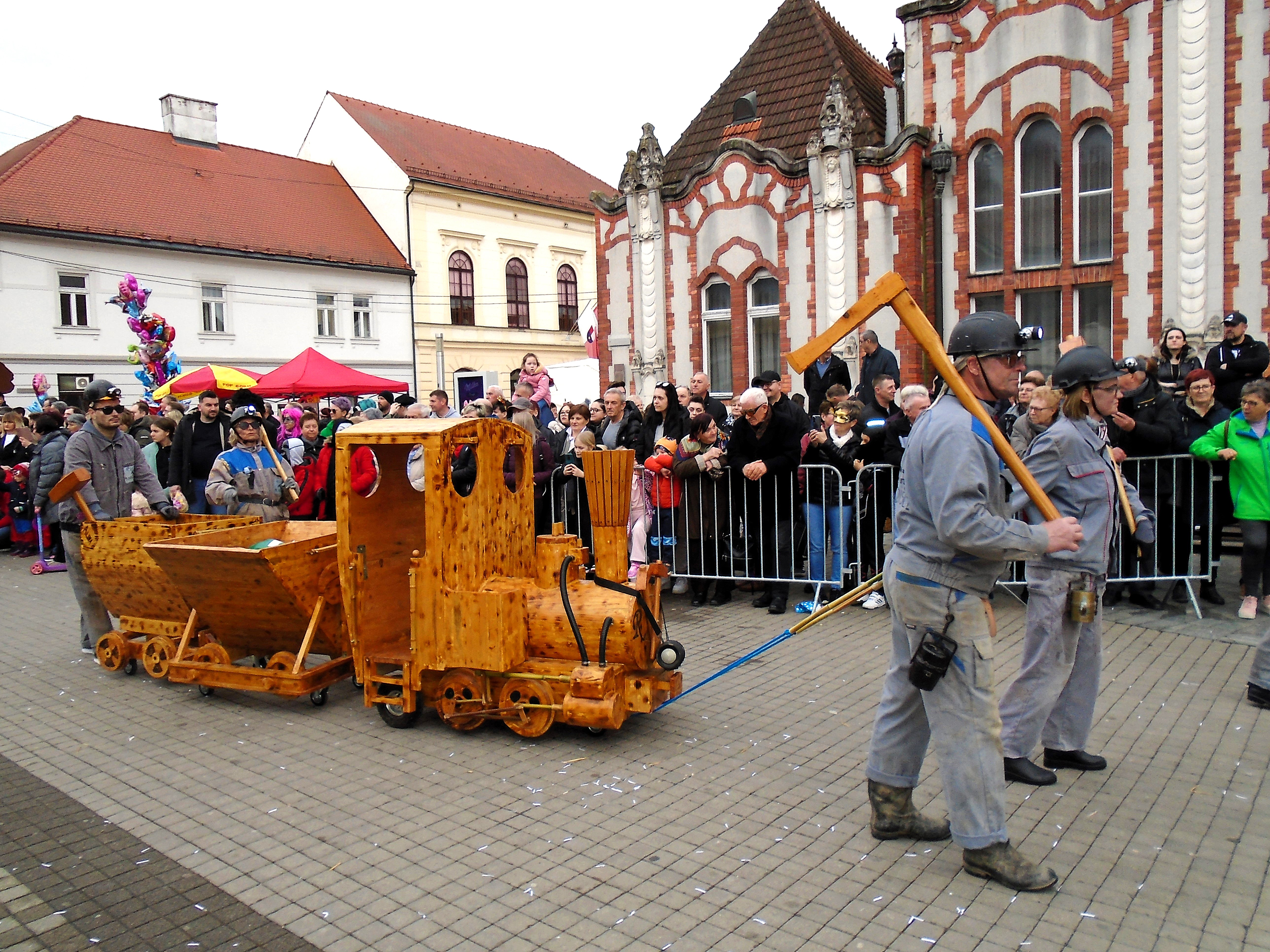
Former coal miners from Međimurje County (Croatia) at a local carnival in Čakovec

Coal, the largest artificial contributor to carbon dioxide emissions, has been criticised for its detrimental effects on health. Coal has been linked to acid rain, smog pollution, respiratory diseases, mining accidents, reduced agricultural yields, and climate change. In response to this, proponents of coal advocate for the low cost of using coal for energy.

New coal pollution mitigation technology, which often refers to carbon capture and storage, seeks to capture carbon dioxide from power plants and prevent it from entering the atmosphere by storing it. Proponents of this approach argue that it can effectively eliminate coal's contributions to climate change, while opponents doubt whether it can be accomplished on a large scale.

The Dutch Research Institute CE Delft estimates that the worldwide "external costs," or hidden costs, of coal in 2007 were €360 billion, excluding the costs of accidents, mining damages, and any loss of cultural heritage or human rights violations that occur as a result of coal production. According to the IEA, the coal-based emissions in 1971–2008 were 303,262 Mt worldwide, 58,210 Mt (19.2%) in OECD Europe, and 5,086 Mt (1.7%) in non-OECD Europe. (Note: The term "Europe" here excludes European Russia and all the ex-Soviet states.) The estimated external costs of coal carbon emissions in 2007 were €69 billion in OECD Europe and €6 billion in non-OECD Europe.

On 20 June 2022, Dutch Climate and Energy Minister Rob Jetten announced that the Netherlands would remove all restrictions on the operation of coal-fired power stations until at least 2024 in response to Russia's refusal to export natural gas to the country. Operations were previously limited to less than a third of the total production.

== Accidents ==
- Gleision Colliery mining accident UK September 2011
- Suhodolskaya-Vostochnaya coal mine Ukraine July 2011
- 2010 Zonguldak mine disaster Turkey May 2010
- Raspadskaya mine explosion Russia, May 2010
- 2009 Wujek-Śląsk mine blast Poland, September 2009
- 2009 Handlová mine blast Slovakia, August 2009
- Petrila Mine disaster Romania November 2008
- 2008 Ukraine coal mine collapse Ukraine June 2008
- 2007 Zasyadko mine disaster Ukraine November 2007
- Yubileynaya mine Russia May 2007
- Ulyanovskaya Mine disaster Russia, March 2007
- Luisenthal Mine Germany February 1962
- Marcinelle mining disaster Belgium August 1956
- Courrières mine disaster France March 1906

== Climate change ==
Annual coal carbon emissions (2005–2008 average) were highest per capita in Europe in the Czech Republic (7.4 Mt), Kazakhstan (6.9 Mt), Poland (5.5 Mt), Finland (4.8 Mt), Serbia (4.5 Mt), and Germany (4.1 Mt).

Annual CO_{2} emissions from coal in Europe (megatons, per IEA)
Rank	Country	Population	1990	2000	2000–4 average	2005–8 average	2005–8 as % of 2000	2005–8 as % of 1990	2005–8 per capita
1	Russia	141.8	687	441	427	421	95%	61%	3.0
2	Germany	82.1	505	337	342	337	100%	67%	4.1
3	Poland	38.1	287	217	211	210	97%	73%	5.5
4	Ukraine	46.3	283	116	127	139	120%	49%	3.0
5	United Kingdom	61.4	238	138	144	147	106%	62%	2.4
6	Turkey	71.1	58	89	80	105	118%	181%	1.5
7	Kazakhstan	15.7	153	80	90	108	135%	71%	6.9
8	Czech Republic	10.4	121	84	80	77	92%	64%	7.4
9	Italy	59.9	55	43	54	63	146%	115%	1.1
10	Spain	45.6	74	81	79	70	86%	95%	1.5
11	France	64.1	74	58	50	52	90%	70%	0.8
12	Romania	21.5	50	29	32	35	123%	71%	1.6
13	Greece	11.2	33	37	38	36	96%	108%	3.2
14	Serbia	7.4	41	35	37	33	94%	79%	4.5
15	Bulgaria	7.6	37	25	28	29	116%	80%	3.9
16	Netherlands	16.4	32	29	32	30	103%	95%	1.8
17	Finland	5.3	21	21	29	25	122%	121%	4.8
18	Belgium	10.7	39	29	23	18	61%	45%	1.6
19	Denmark	5.5	24	15	18	18	114%	74%	3.2
20	Austria	8.3	16	14	16	16	108%	97%	1.9
Total of top 20		730.4	2,827	1,920	1,935	1,970	103%	70%	2.7
Top 20 countries and ranking are based on emissions in 2008.

== See also ==
- Coal mining
  - Mine fire
  - Mining accident
  - Problems in coal mining
  - Coal mining in the United Kingdom
  - Coal power in the United States
