= Mechel =

Russian mining and metals company

Mechel PAO
- Native name: Мечел
- Type: Public (PAO)
- Traded as: MCX: MTLR MCX: MTLRP; NYSE: MTL
- Industry: Mining
- Founded: 2003
- Headquarters: Moscow, Russia
- Key people: Igor Zyuzin (Chairman)
- Products: Coking Coal; Steam Coal; Iron ore in concentrate Raw iron Steel; Rolled steel
- Revenue: $3.43 billion (2025)
- Operating income: −$396 million (2025)
- Net income: −$952 million (2025)
- Total assets: $2.48 billion (2025)
- Total equity: −$2.14 billion (2025)
- Number of employees: more than 80,000
- Website: www.mechel.com

Mechel (Russian: ПАО «Мечел») is one of Russia's mining and metals companies, comprising producers of coal, iron ore in concentrate, steel, rolled steel products. Headquartered in Moscow, it sells its products in Russia and overseas, and is formally known as Public Joint Stock Company Mechel.

== History ==
Under the leadership of Vladimir Iorikh (Russian: Владимир Филиппович Йорих), Southern Kuzbass Coal Company acquired control over Chelyabinsk Steel Plant in the summer of 2002 and subsequently announced a merger of Southern Kuzbass and Mechel into Mechel Steel Group. Igor Zyuzin was elected as Chairman of the Board of Mechel Steel Group OAO in January 2004.

=== Mergers and acquisitions ===
Mechel acquired Posyet Sea Commercial Port on the Russian coast of the Sea of Japan in 2004. Mechel submitted a winning bid for a 26.9% stake in Izhstal in May 2004, subsequently increasing its stake to control. Mechel won an auction in January 2005 to buy a blocking stake (25% plus one share of stock) in Yakutugol. Also in 2005, Mechel acquired a controlling stake in Kambarka River Port. In October 2006, Mechel bought control in Moscow Coke and Gas Plant.

Mechel acquired a controlling stake in Southern Kuzbass GRES OAO and Kuzbassenergosbyt power sales company in 2007. Also in 2007, Mechel added to its asset portfolio the Bratsk Ferroalloy Plant, the largest producer of high-silicon content ferrosilicon in Eastern Siberia, producing 84,000 metric tons of this material per annum, or approximately 14% of the total Russian ferrosilicon output.

Mechel acquired Oriel Resources Ltd in April 2008, which controls the Tikhvin Ferroalloy Plant (in Leningrad Region), the Shevchenko Nickel Deposit (in Kazakhstan) and the Voskhod Chromite Deposit (in Kazakhstan). The Tikhvin Plant has an annual projected capacity of 140,000 metric tons of ferroalloys. Mechel launched a new refinery, Mechel Chrome, at the Voskhod Deposit in September 2008, with annual capacity of approximately 900,000 metric tons of chromite concentrate per annum. Mechel signed a deal to sell the Tikhvin Ferroalloy Plant and the Voskhod Refinery to Turkey's Yildirim Group in 2013. The US$425-million deal was closed in December 2013.

Mechel negotiated the acquisition of 100% in US Bluestone Coal in 2008, for an estimated US$4 billion (approximately). However, the price was revised downward in early 2009 because of the Great Recession: Mechel was to pay for the asset US$425 million and issue 15% of the post-acquisition equity in preferred stock to the current shareholders of Bluestone Coal. After receiving $436 million in cash from Mechel and 83.3 million preferred shares of Mechel stock in 2009, Jim Justice purchased Bluestone Coal from Mechel OAO for only $5 million in cash in February 2015 with Mechel receiving future royalty payments of $3 per ton from Bluestone Coal mines and 12.5% from the sale of Bluestone Coal company if Justice sells the Bluestone Coal company during the next 5 years and 10% from the sale of the Bluestone Coal company during the next 5 to 10 years.

Mechel Trans, a Mechel logistics and transportation subsidiary, acquired a controlling stake (55%) in the Vanino Sea Commercial Port for RUB 15.5 billion from the government at an auction in early December 2012. Only one month later, Mechel re-sold most of its recently acquired stake to a consortium of Russian and international investors. The company later acquired 21.64% of the Port's common stock from En+ for RUB4.57 billion. Mechel sold 21.64% of common stock in Vanino Port for RUB 5 billion on October 23, 2013, retaining only 1.4% in the Port In October 2019, Mechel agreed to buy Gazprombank’s 34% stake in the Elga coal deposit for around 30 billion roubles ($461 million). In 2021, the company's revenue amounted to 28 billion rubles.

=== Criticism from the government ===
Russian Prime Minister Vladimir Putin sharply criticized Mechel management at a government meeting in Nizhniy Novgorod on July 24, 2008, which focused on ongoing troubles in the steel industry. Putin accused Mechel for exporting raw materials for steelmakers at prices about half the domestic level (which could be a sign of tax avoidance). After Putin's accusations, Mechel's stock dropped 37.6% on the New York Stock Exchange, while the Russian Federal Antimonopoly Service launched investigation into Mechel's practice of raising domestic coking coal prices far above the export price levels.

On the following day, July 25, the company issued a contrite statement promising full cooperation with federal authorities, while share values rebounded by nearly 15 percent. However, Vladimir Putin once again criticized Mechel's management on July 28 during a government meeting on transfer pricing, narrowing down his complaint:

When the domestic price is RUB 4,100 [per ton], they sell the [raw materials] to themselves, to their own offshore subsidiaries, in this case to Switzerland, at RUB 1,100 [per ton], which is only one-quarter the domestic price.

After this, the stock price (which had recovered a little over the previous days) collapsed by another 33.85% (producing a combined decline of 60%). The company's market capitalization in August 2011 was still half its value in July 2008.

In mid-August 2008, the Federal Antimonopoly Service found Mechel guilty of violating Article 10 of the Competition Law by causing the domestic price of coking to rise, imposing a relatively small fine for this violation, equivalent to 5% of the group's annual sales, or RUB 790 million. In addition, FAS recommended that Mechel should reduce the domestic price of coking coal by 15%. This caused an additional weakness in the stock price.

In the wake of these events, Mechel announced on August 8 that a preferred share issue, previously planned for placement on August 11, was to be postponed indefinitely. This essentially closed the door to equity finance for Mechel, restricting its financing options to debt.

Vladimir Putin expressed regret over his own comments at a steel industry meeting in Chelyabinsk on July 26, 2010:

How can Mechel organize normal, decent, fair business operation? I remember [my] diatribe against Mechel, and I can only regret that it led to a more than 20% decline in the company's market capitalization. I want to thank Igor Zyuzin — he did everything we spoke about, and he has been on the best, fair behavior

=== Conflicts with minority shareholders ===
Mechel has had numerous conflicts with minority shareholders practically from the time of its incorporation; minority shareholders have accused Mechel of disregarding their rights. Vostok Nafta, Prosperity Capital, Metage Capital and H&Q Fonder accused Mechel in 2002—2004 of unfairly reducing the buyout stock price during consolidation of Mechel's subsidiary Southern Kuzbass assets. The Federal Service for Financial Markets confirmed that Mechel had in fact violated minority shareholders' rights by withholding essential information from them. Eventually, Mechel was forced to buy out the minority shareholders at the market price.

In 2012, at the time when the Russian environmental watchdog Rosprirodnadzor filed claims against Mechel subsidiaries, a minority shareholder in Tomusinsky Open Pit Mine OAO (which is part of Southern Kuzbass) the Swiss Bank Julius Baer and Co. Ltd. accused Tomusinsky of issuing stock at a lower price in violation of the law and shareholders' rights. In 2013, Saven, which held a 22.95% equity stake in Tomusinsky Open Pit Mine OAO, filed nine suits with an arbitration court claiming more than RUB 6 billion from Tomusinsky and several other subsidiaries of Mechel: Yakutugol, Mechel Mining, Mechel Service, Mechel Trans, and Mechel Energo. Saven accused the defendants of diverting profits under the guise of low-interest loans to companies affiliated with Mechel on conditions clearly detrimental to themselves: at interest rates ‘‘below’’ the Russian Central Bank's refinancing rate, i.e. well below the market interest rate, and without any collateral. Argasera also filed a suit in 2013 against Mechel subsidiary Urals Stampings Plant OAO. Courts have invariably ruled for the plaintiffs in these suits.

=== Late 2013 problems ===
Mechel stock unexpectedly dropped sharply towards the end of 2013. The stock dropped 41.35% on November 13, 2013, losing another 18% of their value the following day. Mechel's market capitalization decreased from US$ 24 billion in May 2008 to US$ 830 million in late 2013, while the group's debt had mounted to US$ 9.5 billion. The company started delaying wage payments and contractual payments to suppliers.

Industry experts are unanimous that the company's trouble arise from inefficient acquisitions and highly risky financing policy, which has practically brought Mechel to the brink of bankruptcy. The company has been forced to engage in tough negotiations with both Russian and international creditor banks.

Mechel announced in late November 2013 that it had negotiated an arrangement with creditor banks to restructure debt, extend repayment terms, and be released from debt covenants for a “covenant holiday.”

Some experts believe that the company is no longer capable of servicing its debt, including coupon payments on its corporate bonds. However, market analysts see Mechel's bankruptcy as unlikely, as it would be against the creditors' best interests. Sberbank, VTB, and Gazprombank are Mechel's main creditors, accounting for as much as 60–65% of the group's debt; bonds account for an additional 20–25%. The situation is complicated by the fact that Mechel is in need of dramatic upgrades to its production facilities.

Some observers have noted difficult relationships between Mechel and several local governments of the home regions of Mechel's plants and facilities, pointing out specifically Governor of the Chelyabinsk Region Mikhail Yurevich.

Mechel intends to dispose some of its non-core assets in 2014, as well as a minority stake in Elga coal mine, one of Russia's largest.

By August 2017, 75% of the company's debts had been restructured.

== Shareholders and management ==
Mechel Chairman Igor Zyuzin holds 67.42% of common stock in Mechel OAO (via Calridge Ltd, Bellasis Ltd, Cyberwood Ltd, Actiondeal Ltd, Armolink Ltd, and MetHol LLC). Approximately 30% of common stock and 20% of preferred stock in Mechel is traded as ADS on the New York Stock Exchange (with the ticker MTL). The company's shares are also traded on the Moscow Exchange (ticker MTLR). As of 30 May 2008 the company had a market capitalization of $24 billion.

On the 6th of September 2021, Gazprombank left Mechel capital with 9,35% of equity shares.

=== Management ===
- CEO / General Director: Oleg Korzhov.
- Deputy CEO for Economics and Finance / CFO: Nelli Galeeva.
- Deputy CEO for Government Relations: Viktor Trigubko.
- Deputy CEO for HR and Social Policy: Ekaterina Silayeva.
- Deputy CEO for Security: Valery Sheverdin.
- Deputy CEO for Legal Affairs: Irina Ipeeva.
- Deputy CEO for Financial Control: Dmitry Voytkus.
- Deputy CEO for Operational Efficiency: Elena Samarina.
- Deputy CEO for Commercial Operations: Alexander Kolchin.
- Deputy CEO for Ecology and Environment Protection: Vladimir Kolchin.
- CEO / General Director of Mechel Mining: Andrey Pasynich.
- CEO / General Director of Mechel Steel: Andrey Ponomarev.
- CEO / General Director of Mecheltrans: Alexey Lebedev.
- CEO / General Director of Mechel Energo LLC: Denis Graf.

== Operations ==
Mechel is a steel, metals and mining company. The Mechel Group comprises producers of coking coal, steam coal, iron ore in concentrate, steel, rolled steel, ferroalloys, high value added products, heat and electric power. Mechel sells its output in the Russian and international markets.

=== Constituent companies of Mechel ===
- Mechel Mining OAO (the group's mining assets)
  - Southern Kuzbass Coal Company, Mezhdurechensk, Kemerovo Oblast
  - Yakutugol, Neryungri, Yakutia
  - Korshunov Mining Plant, Zheleznogorsk-Ilimsky, Irkutsk Oblast
  - Elga Coal Deposit, Yakutia
  - Mechel Bluestone, West Virginia, United States: owned by Mechel from 2009 until 2015 when Jim Justice purchased Bluestone Coal
  - Moscow Coke and Gas Plant, Vidnoye, Moscow Oblast
  - Mechel Coke LLC
- Chelyabinsk Metallurgical Plant, Chelyabinsk, Chelyabinsk Oblast
- Izhstal, Izhevsk, Udmurt Republic
- Beloretsk Metallurgical Plant, Beloretsk, Bashkortostan Republic
- Urals Stampings Plant, Chebarkul, Chelyabinsk Oblast
- Moscow Coke and Gas Plant, Vidnoe, Moscow Oblast
- Vyartsilya Metal Products Plant, Vyartsilya, Republic of Karelia
- Mechel Nemunas, Kaunas
- Kaslinsky Plant of Art Casting, Kasli, Chelyabinsk Oblast
- Bratsk Ferroalloy Plant, Bratsk, Irkutsk Oblast — Mechel has held 100% stake in the plant since 2007
- Southern Urals Nickel Plant, Orsk, Orenburg Oblast
- Voskhod Mining Plant, Aktobe Province
- Mechel Energo LLC
- Southern Kuzbass GRES, Kaltan, Kemerovo Oblast
- Kuzbass Power Sales Company, Kemerovo Oblast
- Posiet Sea Trade Port, Primorskiy Krai
- Port of Kambarka (Kama settlement, Udmurt Republic)
- Port Mechel-Temryuk, Krasnodar Krai
- Mecheltrans Vostok LLC
- Mechel Repair Service LLC, Chelyabinsk
- Mecheltrans Auto LLC.

=== Key investment projects ===
- Elga Coal Field (Yakutia) – is one of the largest coal fields in the world with 2.2 billion metric tons of 2P (proven and probable) reserves of coal. Production at the field started in 2011, when Mechel also opened service on its 321-kilometer Ulak – Elga rail track that it built to connect the coal deposit with the Baikal-Amur Mainline. The current plans envisage an increase the field's annual design capacity to 18 million tons of coal by 2018.
- All-purpose rail-and-structural steel rolling mill at the Chelyabinsk Steel Plant – the first facility built from the ground up in Russia capable of producing rails up to 100 meters long. The mill uses steel rolling, tempering, adjustment, finishing, and quality control technologies. The mill has annual capacity of 1.1 million metric tons of finished products. The mill required investments of US$715 million.

=== Operating results ===
In 2012, Mechel produced 11.5 million metric tons of coking coal in concentrate (compared to 12.5 million tons in 2011 and 11.5 million tons in 2010), 5.9 million tons of steam coal (versus 6.4 million tons in 2011 and 8.1 million tons in 2010), 3.5 million tons of coke (compared to 3.4 million tons in 2011 and 3.9 million tons in 2010). The group's steel division produced 4.1 million tons of raw iron in 2012 (compared to 3.7 million tons in 2011 and 4.2 million tons in 2010), 6.5 million tons of steel (compared to 6.1 million tons in 2011 and 6.1 million tons in 2010), 4.8 million tons of rolled steel (versus 4.5 million tons in both 2011 and 2010). Mechel increased its 2012 electric power output by 9% year-over-year to 4,272.6 million GWh.

Mechel's 2013 operating results reflected a substantial decline in output of the group's core products. More specifically, raw iron output declined by 10%, and steel production dropped 29% year-over-year. Mechel CEO Oleg Korzhov explained this decline by the divestiture of several loss-making steel assets in 2013. Coal output declined by 1% compared to 2012.

== Sports sponsorship ==
Mechel has sponsored through the years ice hockey clubs Izhstal based in Izhevsk (Udmurtia) and Mechel based in Chelyabinsk, which are playing in the Russian Major League.
