= Listvyazhnaya mine disaster =

2021 mining disaster in Kemerovo Oblast, Russia

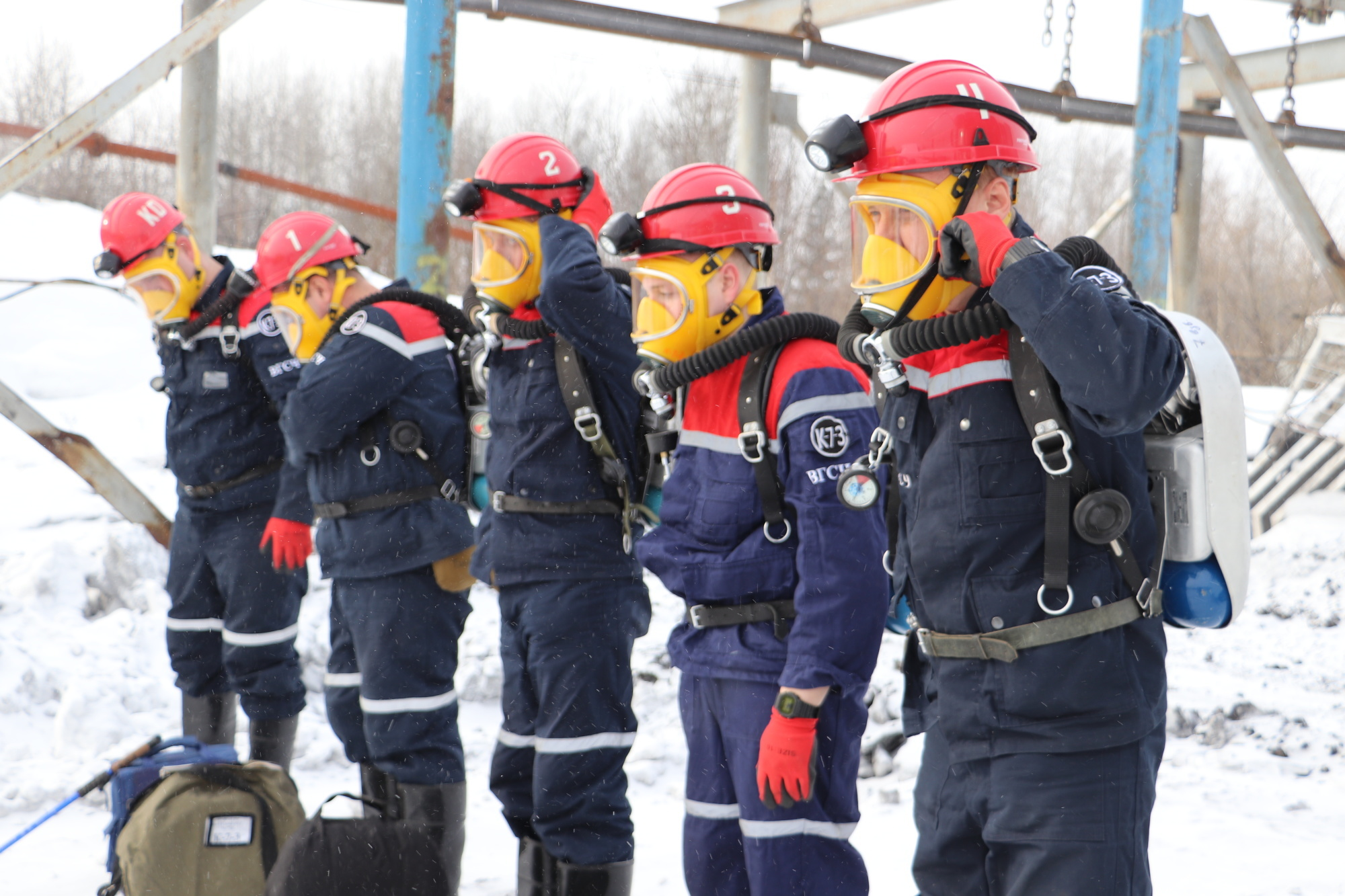
- Rescue team after the accident
- Date: 25 November 2021
- Location: Gramoteino, Kemerovo Oblast, Russia
- Deaths: 51
- Injuries: 106

The Listvyazhnaya mine disaster was a mining accident that occurred on 25 November 2021 in a coal mine in Kemerovo Oblast, Russia. Smoke from a fire in a ventilation shaft caused the suffocation of over 40 miners. A failed attempt to rescue the trapped miners resulted in the deaths of at least five rescuers when the mine exploded. It is the deadliest mine accident in Russia since the 2010 Raspadskaya mine explosion in the same region.

== Background ==
The Listvyazhnaya mine is part of SDS-Holding, which is owned by the Siberian Business Union. According to local media, a methane explosion in the same mine caused 13 deaths in 2004. In 2016, following the Vorkuta mine disaster, Russian authorities assessed the safety of 58 coal mines in the country and declared 34% of them as potentially unsafe. Media reports state that Listvyazhnaya was not among them.

According to independent Russian news agency Interfax, the last inspection of the Listvyazhnaya mine took place on 19 November. After the accident, law enforcement officials stated that the miners had previously complained about the high levels of methane in the mine. Relatives of the victims also claimed that there had been a fire in the mine ten days earlier.

== Accident ==
The incident happened after coal dust from a ventilation shaft caught fire, resulting in a blast that filled the mine with smoke. Eleven miners were found dead in the immediate aftermath. Many other miners managed to escape immediately after the incident; however, dozens more remained trapped. Forty-nine of the survivors were transported to hospitals, some of them showing signs of smoke poisoning, with four in critical condition. Five rescuers were killed when the mine exploded during a failed attempt to reach the trapped miners, and another 53 rescuers were injured. The rescue operations were later suspended after high levels of methane were detected in the mines, increasing the chance of an explosion. The operations later resumed, and 35 more miners were found dead, bringing the death toll to 51. A day later, a rescuer who had gone missing was found alive. He was conscious when he was found and was hospitalized with moderate carbon monoxide poisoning.

There were 285 miners inside during the explosion.

== Aftermath ==
Following the disaster, Russia's Investigative Committee launched a criminal probe into potential safety violations. Three people, including the mine director, his deputy and the site manager, have been arrested. Police in Siberia also arrested two state safety inspectors. President Vladimir Putin expressed his condolences to the victims' families. Kemerovo declared three days of mourning. The head of Russia's Independent Miners' Union, Alexander Sergeyev, blamed the accident on carelessness towards safety rules by mine owners and management.

== See also ==
- Ulyanovskaya Mine disaster
- Yubileynaya mine
