= Raspadskaya =

Raspadskaya may refer to:

- Raspadskaya (company)
- Raspadskaya coal mine, the largest in Russia
  - Raspadskaya mine explosion
- FC Shakhta Raspadskaya Mezhdurechensk
