= Igor Zyuzin =

Russian businessman

- Born: May 29, 1960 (age 66); Kimovsk, Tula Oblast, Russian SFSR
- Education: Tula Polytechnic Institute
- Occupation: Chairman of the board of Directors of Mechel
- Children: 2

Igor Vladimirovich Zyuzin (Russian: И́горь Влади́мирович Зю́зин; born May 29, 1960) is a Russian businessman. He is both chairman of the board of directors and a major shareholder in the mining and steel group Mechel. Zyuzin is married and is a father of two.

== Early life and education ==
Zyuzin was born in Kimovsk, Tula Oblast on May 29, 1960. In 1982, he graduated from the Tula Polytechnic Institute with an honours bachelor's degree equivalent in mining engineering. He graduated from the Tula Polytechnic Institute's Graduate School in 1985, earning his Kandidat of Technical Sciences degree (PhD equivalent) in 1986. He also graduated from the Kuzbass Polytechnic Institute by correspondence with a bachelor's degree equivalent in Economics of Mining in 1992.

== Career ==
Zyuzin began working at Raspadskaya Mine in the Kemerovo Oblast in 1987. He began as a mining foreman and was promoted to mine section supervising foreman and acting senior process engineer in 1989. After an accident, he received disability status and was transferred to the Raspadskaya Design Bureau. He became an intermediary between the government and miners during the 1989 mining strikes and was appointed Deputy CEO for Marketing and Foreign Trade in 1990.

Igor Zyuzin became CEO of Kuzbasskaya Central Refinery in October 1993 and worked at the company for four years. He was chairman of the Board of Mezhdurechensk Ugol OJSC in 1997–1999, and was first elected Chairman of Southern Kuzbass Coal Company OJSC in May 1999. As a key figure at Southern Kuzbass, he was appointed to the Entrepreneurship Council led by Russian Prime Minister Mikhail Kasyanov in 2000.

He joined the Board of Directors of Mechel OJSC (Chelyabinsk Steel Plant) in June 2001 and established the Mechel Group in 2003. Igor Zyuzin's most recent positions at Mechel included:

- Chairman of the Board Mechel Steel Group OJSC starting in January 2004.
- From December 2006 to July 2010 — CEO of Mechel OJSC.
- From July 2010 onward — Chairman of the Board of Mechel.

== Entrepreneurial activities ==
Igor Zyuzin began his independent business ventures in the early 1990s. In 1994, he co-founded Uglemet, a company whose name is derived from the Russian words for "coal" and "metal." The company secured significant coal sale quotas during its early years. Zyuzin and his business partner, Vladimir Iorikh, initially traded coal produced by Kuzbass mines before transitioning to acquiring shares in mining companies. During the late 1990s, they acquired Southern Kuzbass, Mezhdurechenskugol, and several other mining enterprises. Zyuzin managed operational aspects of the business, while Iorikh oversaw finance and sales.

In 2001, Zyuzin and Iorikh purchased a controlling stake in Mechel OJSC for $133 million. Subsequently, they expanded into steel production through further acquisitions. Mechel went public in 2004, with Iorikh credited for the success of its initial public offering (IPO). At the time of the IPO, Zyuzin and Iorikh each retained a 47.8% equity stake in the company, collectively valued at $1.1 billion. By the end of 2006, Iorikh sold his entire stake, primarily to Zyuzin, who financed the acquisition through loans amounting to approximately $1 billion. According to a February 2007 filing with the U.S. Securities and Exchange Commission (SEC), Zyuzin held a 68.2% equity stake in Mechel.

Following his increased ownership in Mechel, Zyuzin pursued an aggressive acquisition strategy, heavily financed through debt. In 2007 and 2008, the company spent $2.47 billion and $2.8 billion, respectively, on asset acquisitions. Despite the global economic challenges of the 2008 financial crisis, Mechel's stock price experienced growth. Throughout 2009, Zyuzin continued acquiring assets while negotiating debt restructuring agreements with Russian banks.

=== Criticism by Prime Minister Vladimir Putin ===
In the first year of his second term as Prime Minister of Russia, politician Vladimir Putin sharply criticised Zyuzin for charging reduced export prices, claiming they stood at half the domestic price. On July 24, 2008, a Russian resource mining and fabrication industry meeting was held to discuss the high domestic prices of steel, coal, and other raw materials, which Zyuzin did not attend, claiming indisposition. It is alleged that Prime Minister Putin promised to call "doctors" from the Federal Antimonopoly Service and other federal criminal investigators. A number of business news websites, newspapers and magazines claimed at the time that Putin's diatribe against Zyuzin caused a panic in the Russian stock market, triggering a market-wide sell-off which took years to recover from.

Despite contentions with the then Prime Minister, Mechel remained financially viable, owing partially to the support it received from outside sources.

Inversely, Putin is on record as praising Zyuzin's actions in June 2010.

=== Decline of net value ===
After Vladimir Putin's criticism, Igor Zyuzin took action to improve his standing and reputation with the government and government officials. In 2009, he participated in a federal effort to save the financially destitute Zlatoust Steel Plant in Chelyabinsk Oblast. However, the project, widely regarded as an "example of excellent social responsibility," ultimately failed. In 2013, companies controlled by Zyuzin initiated bankruptcy proceedings against the plant. Zyuzin faced renewed criticism for this from the Russian media.

Mechel disclosed in June 2009 that more than half of Zyuzin's stake in Mechel — 37.9% out of 66% — was pledged as security to bank loans. After this, Mechel's debt continued to grow rapidly. The company's net debt stood at US$9.1 billion as of September 30, 2012. By the end of 2013, Zyuzin had lost most of his fortune after a steep decline in Mechel's stock price. Forbes named this loss the "fiasco of the year," estimating Zyuzin's fortune as of December 3, 2013, at no more than US$300 million, or a mere 2 percent of his peak value. By late November 2013, banks held lien for 88% of Zyuzin's entire Mechel stake.

== Managerial skill and wealth rankings ==
Kommersant Business Daily ranked Zyuzin fifth among senior managers in the Metals and Mining Sector in 2010. With a personal fortune of US$8.9 billion, he was ranked 16th on the Forbes list of 200 richest Russian business people. After losing a substantial portion of his net value in 2013 due to the Mechel stock decline, he dropped out of the top 100 of the Forbes list.
