= Mezhdurechensky District =

Location of Kemerovo Oblast in Russia

Location of Vologda Oblast in Russia

Mezhdurechensky District is the name of several administrative and municipal districts in Russia:

- Mezhdurechensky District, Kemerovo Oblast, an administrative district of Kemerovo Oblast
- Mezhdurechensky District, Vologda Oblast, an administrative and municipal district of Vologda Oblast

== See also ==
- Mezhdurechensky (disambiguation)
