= Nikolai Belov (engineer) =

Soviet hydroelectric scientist

- Born: Nikolai Semyonovich Belov; April 25, 1908; Kazan Governorate, Russian Empire
- Died: 1972; Kemerovo, RSFSR, Soviet Union
- Education: Moscow Power Engineering Institute
- Scientific career
- Fields: Hydroelectricity

Nikolai Semyonovich Belov (Russian: Николай Семёнович Белов; 25 April 1908 – 1972) was a Soviet scientist in the field of hydroelectricity awarded the title Hero of Socialist Labour.

== Early life ==
Nikolai Semyonovich Belov was born in 1908 in the Kazan Governorate.

As a Komsomol activist, he was sent to study in Moscow at the Moscow Power Engineering Institute, where he graduated from in 1935.

== Career ==
Beginning in 1947, he worked as the dispatcher on the power plant-5 "Mosenergo". He was appointed engineer of Shaturskaya GRES. Later, he served as the chief engineer of the Cheboksary SDPP, the director of Dalenergo, the manager of the Far Eastern energy system and the director of Kuzbassenergo of the Kemerovo Oblast. Under his leadership, an electrical system was installed at the South Kuzbass, Tom-Usinskaya, Belovskaya GRES, Novo-Kemerovo and West-Siberian CHP.

By the decree of the Presidium of the Supreme Soviet of the USSR of October 4, 1966, he was awarded the title of Hero of Socialist Labor with the award of the Order of Lenin, for outstanding achievements in fulfilling the seven-year plan for the development of the country's energy.

== Bibliography ==
- Гулый, П., Воплощая мечту Ильича / П. Гулый // Наши земляки — Герои Социалистического Труда. — Чебоксары, 1971. — С. 216—220.
- Мадебейкин, И. Н., Белов Николай Семенович/ Краткая чувашская энциклопедия. — Чебоксары. 2001. — С. 85.
- Мадебейкин, И. Н., Белов Николай Семенович // Чувашская энциклопедия. — Чебоксары, 2006. — Т. 1 : А-Е. — С. 200.
- Шаги пятилетки : Кузбасс, год 1966. Выпуск восьмой. — Кемерово : Кем. кн. изд-во, 1967. — С. 150;
- Герои Социалистического Труда // Историческая энциклопедия Сибири : в 3 т. / Российская академия наук, Сибирское отделение, Институт истории; [рук. проекта акад. РАН А. П. Деревянко; гл. ред. В. А. Ламин; отв. ред. В. И. Клименко]. — Новосибирск : Историческое наследие Сибири, 2009. — [Т. 3] : С — Я. — 2009. — С. 707—778;
- Бритвин, О. Память о выдающемся энергетике: 100 лет Николаю Семеновичу Белову / О. Бритвин // Кузбасс. — 2008. — 24 апр. — С. 25 : фото.
- Энергетик от Бога // Кругозор в Кузбассе. — 2008. — 14 мая. — С. 4 : фото;
