= Vorkuta mine disaster =

2016 mine explosions in the Komi Republic, Russia

- Date: 25 February 2016
- Time: 14:22 MSK (10:22 UTC)
- Location: Severny, Komi Republic, Russia; 67.587844°N 64.098268°E
- Deaths: 36
- Injuries: 9
- Verdict: Explosions caused by a leak of methane gas
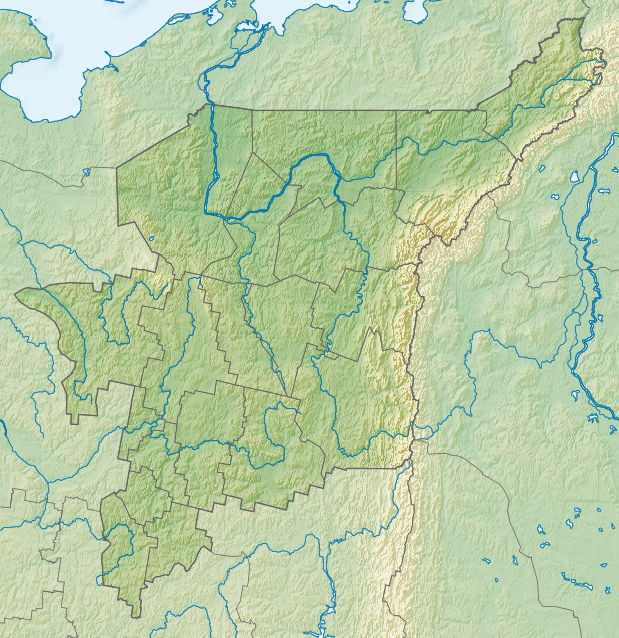
- Vorkuta mine disaster (Komi Republic)

Location of Komi Republic within Russia

In February 2016, a series of explosions caused the deaths of 36 people, including 31 miners and five rescue workers, at the Severnaya coal mine 10 kilometres north of the city of Vorkuta, Komi Republic, Russia. The explosions were believed to be caused by ignition of leaking methane gas. It is the second deadliest mining disaster of the 2010s behind the Soma mine disaster, and fourth deadliest of the 21st century thus far.

== Background ==
Vorkuta sits in the Pechora coal basin, a coal-rich area of Russia, and its coal has been mined since the 1930s. The Severnaya ("Northern") mine near Vorkuta is operated by Vorkutaugol, a subsidiary of Severstal. In 2015, the mine was one of the largest producers for Vorkutaugol, mining 2.9 million tons of coal and making up 27% of the company's output.

== Chronology ==
On 25 February 2016, two explosions occurred within the mine, setting off a partial collapse of the mine and killing four miners while trapping twenty-six; eighty-one other miners were evacuated safely with minor injuries. The explosions, occurring about 780 metres (2,560 ft) below ground and occurring about an hour apart during the afternoon, were believed to have been started by the ignition of a methane gas leak. Rescue efforts for the trapped miners began promptly, with at least 500 people involved. Efforts were hampered by Vorkuta's remote location within the Arctic Circle, the presence of methane gas within the mine, which workers feared would spark another explosion, and lack of communication with the trapped miners.

In the morning of 28 February, a third explosion, also believed to be caused by methane gas, shook the mine, causing further collapses. Five rescue workers and another miner, attempting to reach the trapped miners, were killed. Based on the proximity of the explosion to where the trapped miners were located, the trajectory of the flames, and the high concentration of carbon monoxide in the mine's air, Russia's Emergency Situations Minister Vladimir Puchkov believed the trapped miners were also killed in the explosion. A number of people involved in the rescue attempt at the surface were also injured. The rescue operation was subsequently halted, believing all lives were lost. Plans were made to extinguish the fire by either starving it of oxygen or partially flooding the mine, following the termination of rescue attempts. At least three additional explosions have occurred in the mine between 28 February and 1 March following cessation of rescue efforts, with no reported injuries. As the mine has now been deemed too hazardous for workers to enter, special robots, equipped with cameras, gas sensors, and other metering devices, have been employed to survey the damage and determine when the mine is safe to enter again.

== Reactions ==
Deputy Prime Minister Arkady Dvorkovich visited the site after the explosions on 28 February and called the explosion "a terrible tragedy for Russia and for our coal industry". The explosion was considered to be the deadliest in Russia's mining industry since the 2010 Raspadskaya mine explosion which killed 91 workers.

The investigation of explosions and the deaths of the miners are being treated as criminal proceedings under Russia's Criminal Code, citing violation of safety codes. According to the daughter of one of the mine managers, the miners were told to cover or bury gas detectors which would have alerted the miners to high levels of methane. Dvorkovich stated on 20 February that their preliminary findings indicated that the third explosion was caused by a sudden increase in methane concentration, something that these sensors would not have been able to detect in time, and that the explosion would be considered a natural disaster and not a result of intentional actions. Russia's President Vladimir Putin plans to discuss measures to improve the safety of the Vorkuta mine and other mines across the country with Alexei Aleshin, the head of Rostekhnadzor which oversees industrial safety in the country.

According to the Russian News Agency TASS, all the rescue workers killed or injured would receive state awards. The recovered bodies were given funerals on 29 February, and the Komi Republic declared a three-day period of mourning for the losses. The Russian ministry of emergency situations listed the names of the 31 miners and 5 rescue workers who died during the disaster and subsequent rescue operations.

The Vorkuta mine was expected to be closed for several months before normal mining operations could begin, with those workers offered temporary positions at other nearby mines. An analyst for Morgan Stanley estimated that the loss of the use of the mine will cost Severstal around $24 million.

== See also ==
- Ulyanovskaya Mine disaster—19 March 2007, methane explosion, at least 108 killed
- Yubileynaya mine—24 May 2007, methane explosion, 39 killed
- 2013 Vorkuta Mine Disaster— 10 February 2013, methane explosion, 18 killed
- Listvyazhnaya mine disaster—25 November 2021, dust explosion, 52 killed
