= Saima Karimova =

Soviet-Russian geologist (1926–2013)

- Саима Каримова
- Born: Saima Safievna Karimova; 31 October 1926; Frunze, Kirghiz ASSR
- Died: 1 January 2013 (aged 86); Neryungri, Sakha, Russia
- Occupation: Geologist
- Years active: 1950–1988
- Children: 3
- Awards: Order of the Red Banner of Labour; Hero of Socialist Labour; Order of Lenin; USSR State Prize

Saima Safievna Karimova (Russian: Саима Сафиевна Каримова; 31 October 1926 – 1 January 2013) was a Soviet and Russian geologist. She was a senior geologist at the South Yakutsk complex expedition as a senior geologist of coal exploration and thematic parties from 1955 to 1968 and led its geological department. Karimova was the chief geologist of the South Yakut Complex Expedition from 1968 to her retirement in 1988 and was a significant contributor to the geological study of South Sakha. She opened the Elga coal mine in 1981, evaluated alluvial deposits of gold, uranium, molybdenum, granite, marble, building materials, facing raw materials in Yakutia and helped to develop coal deposits, iron ore deposits and phlogopite deposits. Karimova was the recipient of various state awards such as the Order of Lenin and the Order of the Red Banner of Labour.

== Biography ==
On 31 October 1926, Karimova was born into a working-class family in the city of Frunze in the Kirghiz ASSR. Her parents had moved from Tatarstan to Kyrgyzstan in 1921. The family later moved to the mining village of Rutchenkovo in the Donbas (today in Donetsk) in 1937 because of the fear of reprisals. Karimova completed her studies at a Ukrainian school and excelled academically. When the Great Patriotic War broke out in 1941, she and her family were evacuated to the Eastwards to the village of Kül Çerkene in the Buinsky District, Tatarstan. She completed ten classes in the settlement of Buinsk and enrolled at the Geological Faculty of the Kazan University. During her studies, Karimova worked with the Olekma geological exploration expedition in Eastern Siberia.

Following her graduation from Kazan University in 1950, she began working as a geologist and later senior geologist at the Aldan geological exploration expedition in the village of Uchkulan, South Yakutia. Karimova was assigned to work with the Nimnyr party at the Fedorovsky mica deposit in the village of Snezhny until 1955 and the site's inaccessibility meant she had to enter it by foot and followed carts carrying explosives for 47 km (29 mi). From 1955 to 1968, Karimova worked at the South Yakutsk complex expedition as a senior geologist of coal exploration and thematic parties and was the leader of its geological department. Her role entailed the thorough study and demonstrate to the State Commission for Mineral Reserves that the Neryungri coal deposit had high potential. The result of which saw the redrilling of hundreds of wells, well logs were checked and old drilling results were collected.

She was appointed chief geologist of the South Yakut Complex Expedition in 1968 and remained in the role until her retirement in 1988. Karimova contributed significantly to the geological study of the south of Sakha, which was the region's first geological and industrial map to be compiled. She prepared for the industrial development of the South Yakutsk coking coal basin on the basis of which today's South Yakutsk territorial-industrial complex grew from. Under her leadership, the exploration of the Neryungri coal deposit was finished. Karimova drew up a task force for the Neryungri coal deposit from July to October 1973 and successfully protected its reserves from the State Commission in December 1973 when it was reported that it produced around 450,000,000 t (440,000,000 long tons; 500,000,000 short tons) million of coal. She opened the Elga coal mine in 1981. Karimova took part in evaluating alluvial deposits of gold, uranium, molybdenum, granite, marble, building materials, facing raw materials in Yakutia and did searches for underground fresh and mineral waters for the facilities of the South Yakutsk coal complex. She directly helped to develop the Denisovskoye and Chulmakanskoye coal deposits as well as the Desovskoye and Tayozhnoye iron ore deposits, the Fedorovskoye, Nadezhnoye, and Yuzhnoye phlogopite deposits that came into operation.

Karimova was the author, co-author and editor of more than 20 printed articles on geology and the South Yakutsk coal basin's development that received the State Committee's approval. She was an elected deputy of the fifth convocation of the Supreme Soviet of the Yakut ASSR from 1976 to 1988.

== Personal life ==
She was married to the geologist Salimkham Vafinovich Zinuro and the couple had three children. Karimova retained her maiden name during the marriage. She died in the town of Neryungri on 1 January 2013.

== Awards ==
She was awarded the Order of the Red Banner of Labour on 29 April 1963. On 10 March 1976, Karimova was given the title of Hero of Socialist Labour with the Order of Lenin and the "Hammer and Sickle" gold medal "for the outstanding success achieved in fulfilling the tasks of the ninth five-year plan and socialist obligations to increase the explored reserves of minerals and improve the efficiency of geological exploration."

In 1982, she was awarded the USSR State Prize "for the creation of the coal mineral resource base of the South Yakutsk Territorial Production Complex." Karimova was made an Honorary Citizen of the Neryungri Region on 18 December 1982. She would become an Honorary Citizen of the Republic of Sakha (Yakutia) on 24 April 1997. Karimova was also made an Honoured Geologist of the RSFSR, and a Honoured Geologist of the Yakut ASSR. On 7 November 2015, a public garden at Neryungri city gymnasium No. 1 district library system that featured a memorial plaque was opened and named for Karimova.
