= Mezhdurechensky =

Mezhdurechensky (masculine), Mezhdurechenskaya (feminine), or Mezhdurechenskoye (neuter) may refer to:

- Mezhdurechensky District, name of several districts in Russia
- Mezhdurechensky Urban Okrug, a municipal formation in Kemerovo Oblast
- Mezhdurechensky (inhabited locality) (Mezhdurechenskaya, Mezhdurechenskoye), name of several inhabited localities in Russia
- Mezhdurechenskoe, a village in Almaty Province, Kazakhstan
