= Mezhdurechensky District, Kemerovo Oblast =

Mezhdurechensky District Междуреченский район (Russian)
- District
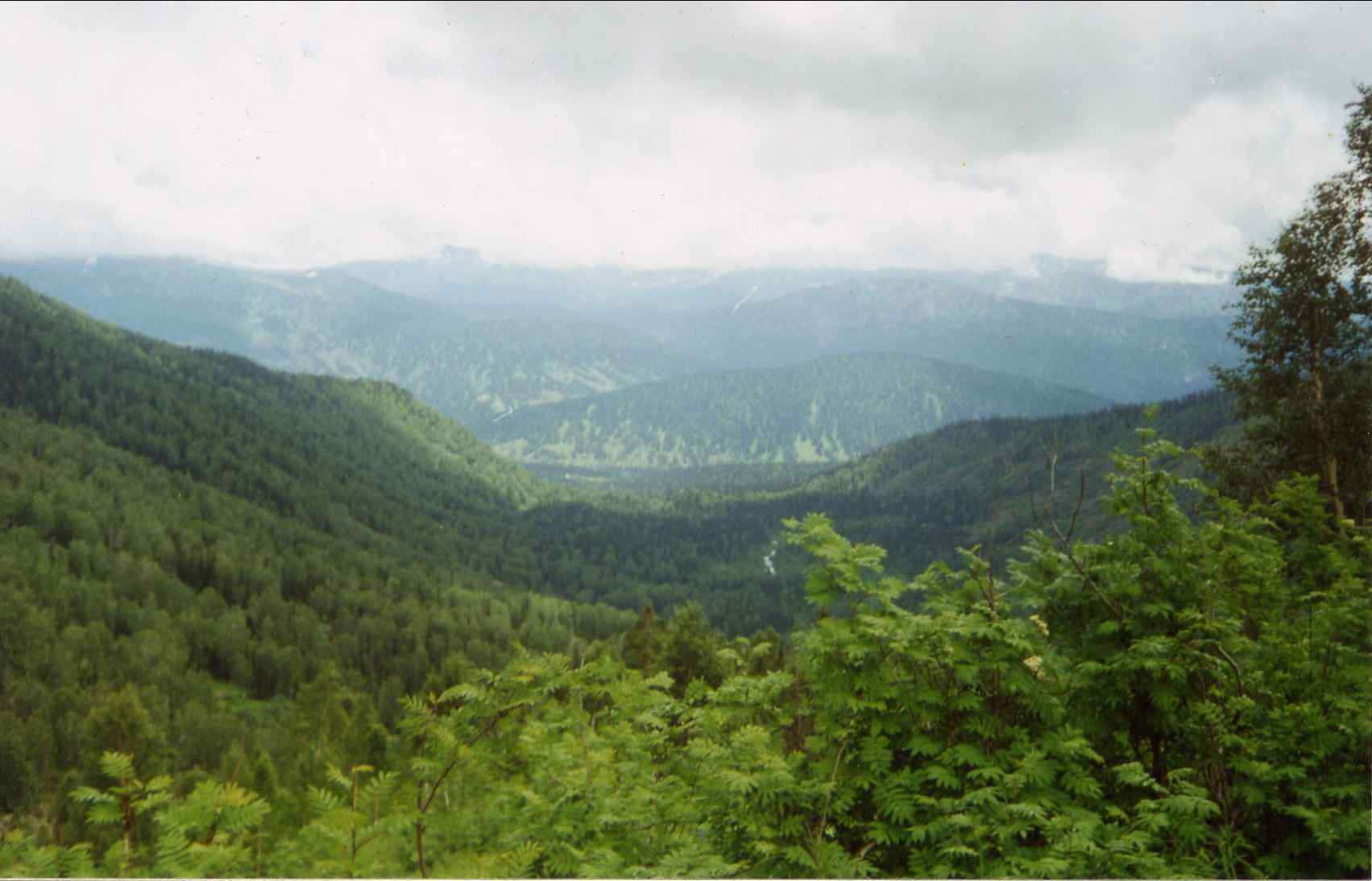
- Podnebesnye Zubya Nature Park, in Mezhdurechensky District

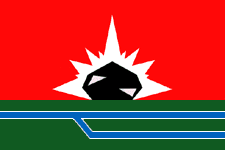
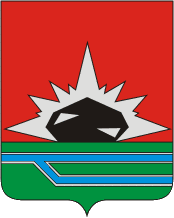
- Flag Coat of arms
- Location of Mezhdurechensky District in Kemerovo Oblast
- Coordinates: 53.686°N 88.064°E
- Country: Russia
- Federal subject: Kemerovo Oblast
- Administrative center: Mezhdurechensk

Area
  - Total: 6,930 km^{2} (2,680 sq mi)

Population (2010 Census)
  - Total: 2,268
  - Density: 0.327/km^{2} (0.848/sq mi)
  - Urban: 0%
  - Rural: 100%

Administrative structure
  - Inhabited localities: 11 rural localities

Municipal structure
  - Municipally incorporated as: Mezhdurechensky Urban Okrug
- Website: http://www.mrech.ru/

Mezhdurechensky District (Russian: Междуре́ченский райо́н) is an administrative district (raion), one of the nineteen in Kemerovo Oblast, Russia. It is located in the southeast of the oblast. Its administrative center is the city of Mezhdurechensk (which is not administratively a part of the district). Population: 2,268 (2010 census); 2,658 (2002 Census).

== Administrative and municipal status ==
Within the framework of administrative divisions, Mezhdurechensky District is one of the nineteen in the oblast. The city of Mezhdurechensk serves as its administrative center, despite being incorporated separately as a town under oblast jurisdiction—an administrative unit with the status equal to that of the districts.

As a municipal division, the territory of the administrative district and the territory of Mezhdurechensk City Under Oblast Jurisdiction are incorporated together as Mezhdurechensky Urban Okrug.
