= South Kuzbass Power Station =

Power plant in Kaltan, Kemerovo, Russia

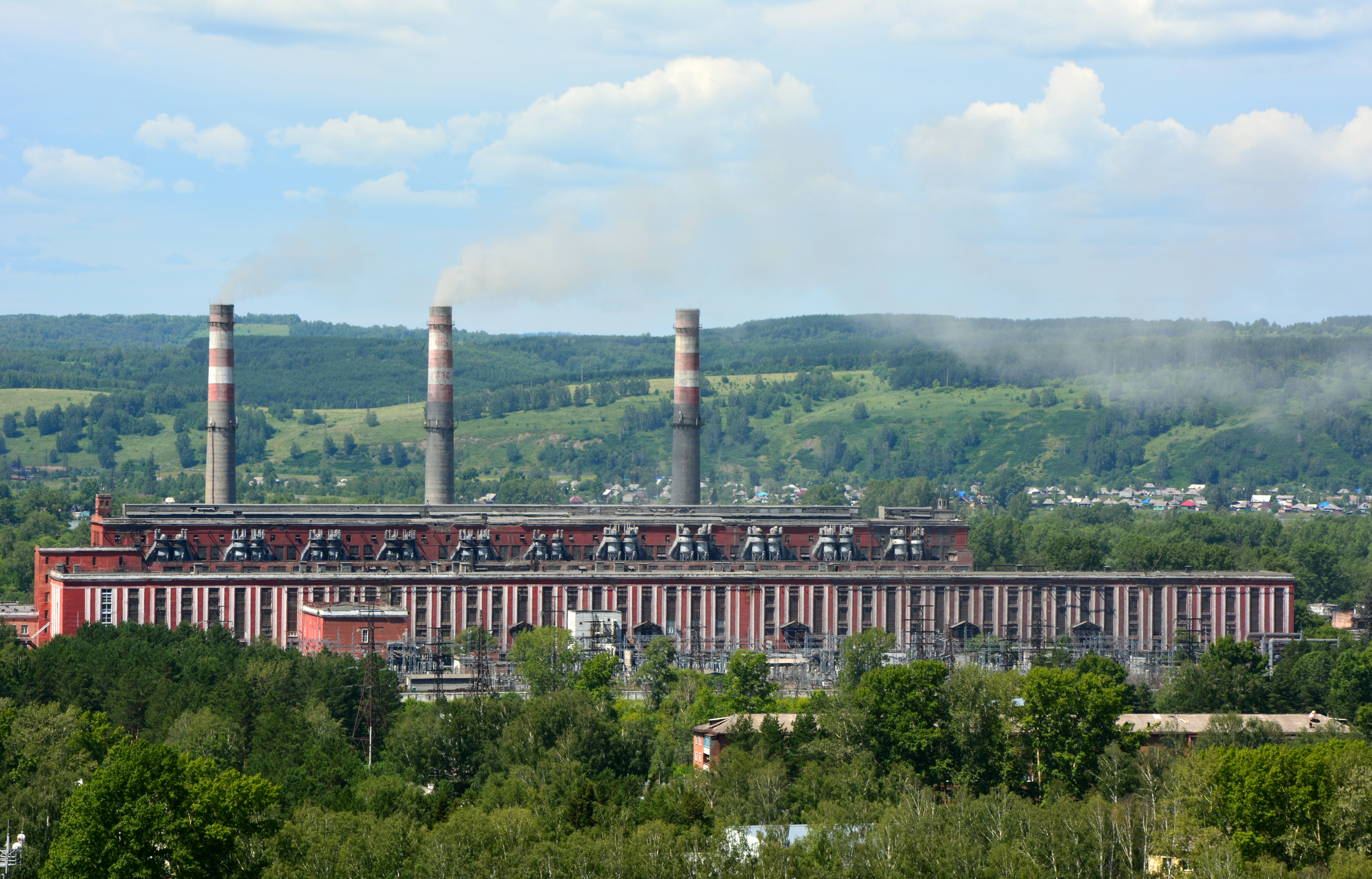
- Country: Russia
- Location: Kaltan, Kemerovo
- Coordinates: 53°30′44″N 87°15′55″E
- Owner: Mechel

External links
- Website: www.ukgres.ru
- Commons: Related media on Commons

South Kuzbass GRES is a thermal power plant (GRES) in Kaltan, Kemerovo Oblast, Russia. It is also known as the Yuzhno-Kuzbasskaya power station.

As of 2023, total electric power is 554 MW, heating — 560 Gcal/h.

It is currently a part of Mechel, although in 2025, Mechel's CEO Oleg Korzhov stated the company was "actively in discussions" to sell the plant.

GRES is located close to the local coal deposits, largest metallurgical power-consuming industries, mining complexes and the public service of the southern Kuzbass. Coal for the GRES arrives primarily from the Southern Kuzbass Coal Company, also owned by Mechel.

== See also ==
- List of power stations in Russia
