= Mine safety =

Practice of controlling mining hazards

Mine safety is a broad term referring to the practice of controlling and managing a wide range of hazards associated with the life cycle of mining-related activities. Mine safety practice involves the implementation of recognised hazard controls and/or reduction of risks associated with mining activities to legally, socially and morally acceptable levels. While the fundamental principle of mine safety is to remove health and safety risks to mine workers, mining safety practice may also focus on the reduction of risks to plant (machinery) together with the structure and orebody of the mine.

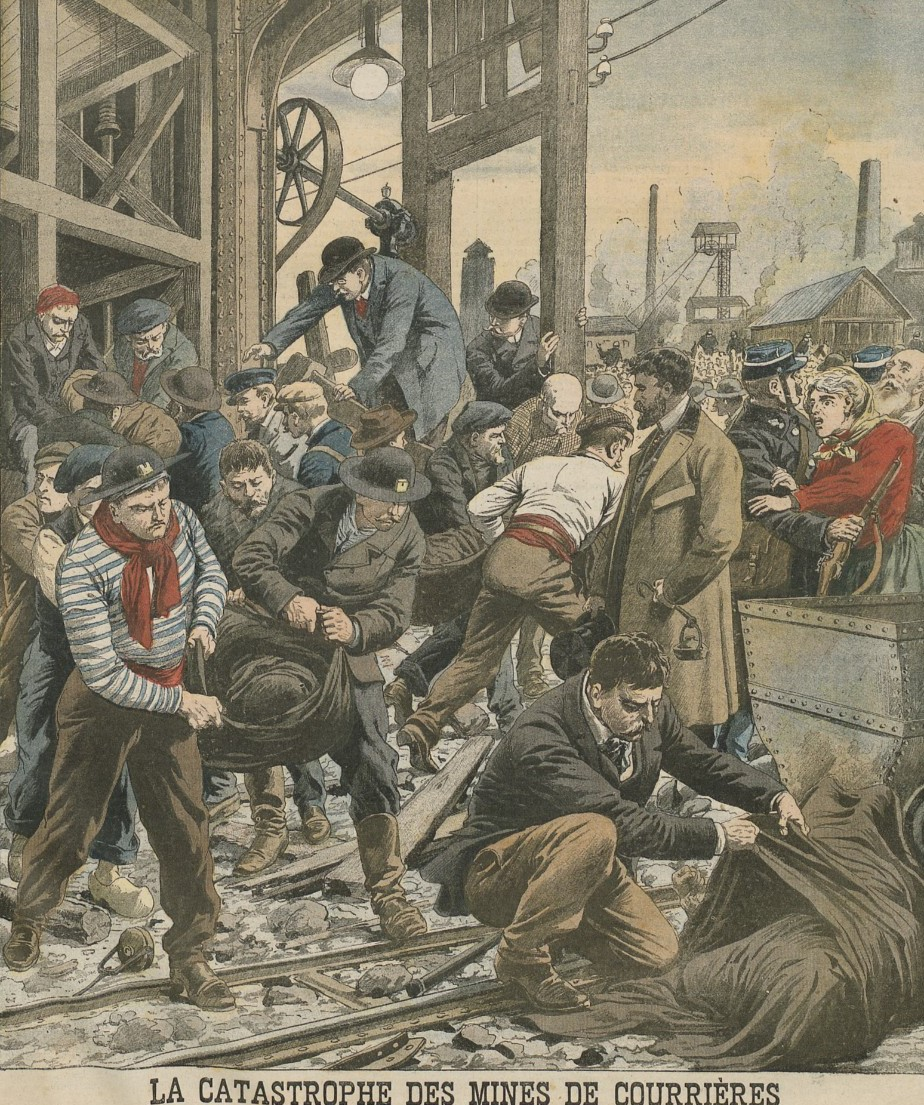
Le Petit Journal illustration of the Courrières mine disaster

Firefighter training in fell slate mine, Germany

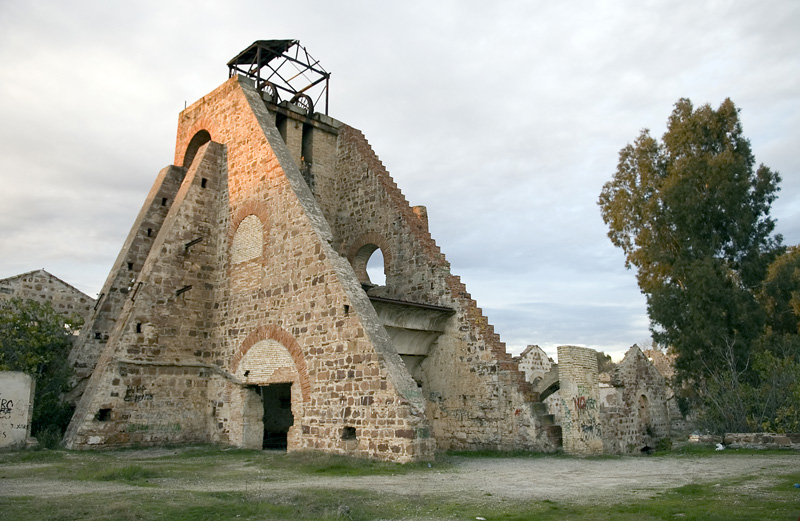
Remnants of pit "San Vicente" in Linares, Jaén, Spain. On its last day of operation, in 1967, six workers died in an elevator accident.

Safety has long been a concern in the mining business, especially in underground mining. The Courrières mine disaster, Europe's worst mining accident, involved the death of 1,099 miners in Northern France on March 10, 1906. This disaster was surpassed only by the Benxihu Colliery accident in China on April 26, 1942, which killed 1,549 miners. While mining today is substantially safer than it was in previous decades, mining accidents still occur. Government figures from China indicate that 5,000 Chinese miners die in accidents each year, while other reports have suggested a figure as high as 20,000. Mining accidents continue worldwide, including accidents causing dozens of fatalities at a time such as the 2007 Ulyanovskaya Mine disaster in Russia, the 2009 Heilongjiang mine explosion in China, and the 2010 Upper Big Branch Mine disaster in the United States.

== Hazards and prevention ==
=== Ventilation ===
Mining ventilation is a significant safety concern for many miners. Poor ventilation inside sub-surface mines causes exposure to harmful gases, heat, and dust, which can cause illness, injury, and death. The concentration of methane and other airborne contaminants underground can generally be controlled by dilution (ventilation), capture before entering the host air stream (methane drainage), or isolation (seals and stoppings). A ventilation system is set up to force a stream of air through the working areas of the mine. The air circulation necessary for effective ventilation of a mine is generated by one or more large mine fans, usually located above ground. Air flows in one direction only, making circuits through the mine such that each main work area constantly receives a supply of fresh air. Watering down in coal mines also helps to keep dust levels down: by spraying the machine with water and filtering the dust-laden water with a scrubber fan, miners can successfully trap the dust.

Gases in mines can poison the workers or displace the oxygen in the mine, causing asphyxiation. For this reason, the U.S. Mine Safety and Health Administration requires that groups of miners in the United States carry gas detection equipment that can detect common gases, such as CO, O_{2}, H_{2}S, CH_{4}, as well as calculate % Lower Explosive Limit. Regulation requires that all production stop if there is a concentration of 1.4% of flammable gas present. Additionally, further regulation is being requested for more gas detection as newer technology such as nanotechnology is introduced.

=== Gas ignition ===
Ignited methane gas is a common source of explosions in coal mines, which in turn can initiate more extensive coal dust explosions. For this reason, rock dusts such as limestone dust are spread throughout coal mines to diminish the chances of coal dust explosions as well as to limit the extent of potential explosions, in a process known as rock dusting. Coal dust explosions can also begin independently of methane gas explosions. Frictional heat and sparks generated by mining equipment can ignite both methane gas and coal dust. For this reason, water is often used to cool rock-cutting sites.

=== Noise ===
Miners utilize equipment strong enough to break through extremely hard layers of the Earth's crust. This equipment, combined with the closed work space in which underground miners work, can cause hearing loss. For example, a roof bolter (commonly used by mine roof bolter operators) can reach sound power levels of up to 115 dB. Combined with the reverberant effects of underground mines, a miner without proper hearing protection is at a high risk for hearing loss. By age 50, nearly 90% of U.S. coal miners have some hearing loss, compared to only 10% among workers not exposed to loud noises. Roof bolters are among the loudest machines, but auger miners, bulldozers, continuous mining machines, front end loaders, and shuttle cars and trucks are also among those machines most responsible for excessive noise in mine work.

The preferred prevention strategy involves engineering controls to eliminate noise sources. Administrative controls and hearing protection can also be used when engineering controls are not feasible.

=== Cave-ins and rock falls ===
A video on preventing rock falls in mines

Since mining entails removing dirt and rock from its natural location, thereby creating large empty pits, rooms, and tunnels, cave-ins as well as ground and rock falls are a major concern within mines. Modern techniques for timbering and bracing walls and ceilings within sub-surface mines have reduced the number of fatalities due to cave-ins, but ground falls continue to represent up to 50% of mining fatalities. Even in cases where mine collapses are not instantly fatal, they can trap mine workers deep underground. Cases such as these often lead to high-profile rescue efforts, such as when 33 Chilean miners were trapped deep underground for 69 days in 2010.

=== Heat exposure ===
High temperatures and humidity may result in heat-related illnesses, including heat stroke, which can be fatal. The presence of heavy equipment in confined spaces also poses a risk to miners. To improve the safety of mine workers, modern mines use automation and remote operation including, for example, such equipment as automated loaders and remotely operated rockbreakers. However, despite modern improvements to safety practices, mining remains a dangerous occupation throughout the world.

=== Use of explosives ===
A video on handling explosives in underground mines

Explosives are used in mines for constructive purposes, but can be hazardous if proper safety measures are not taken. For example, flyrock can be ejected beyond the blast site, causing personal injuries and damage to property.

=== Dust exposure ===
In coal mining, the extraction, crushing, and transport of coal can generate significant amounts of airborne respirable (extremely fine) coal dust. Dust less than 10 microns in size cannot be seen with the eye. In non-coal mining, stone, and sand and gravel mining operations and for particular occupations in coal mines, the respirable silica dust created during mining is the primary concern. Respirable dust can cause long-term lung problems. Respirable coal dust can cause coal workers' pneumoconiosis (also known as miners lung or black lung disease), respirable silica dust can cause silicosis, lung cancer, and chronic obstructive pulmonary disease. Elongate mineral particles can lead to asbestosis, lung cancer, and mesothelioma.

== Abandoned mines ==
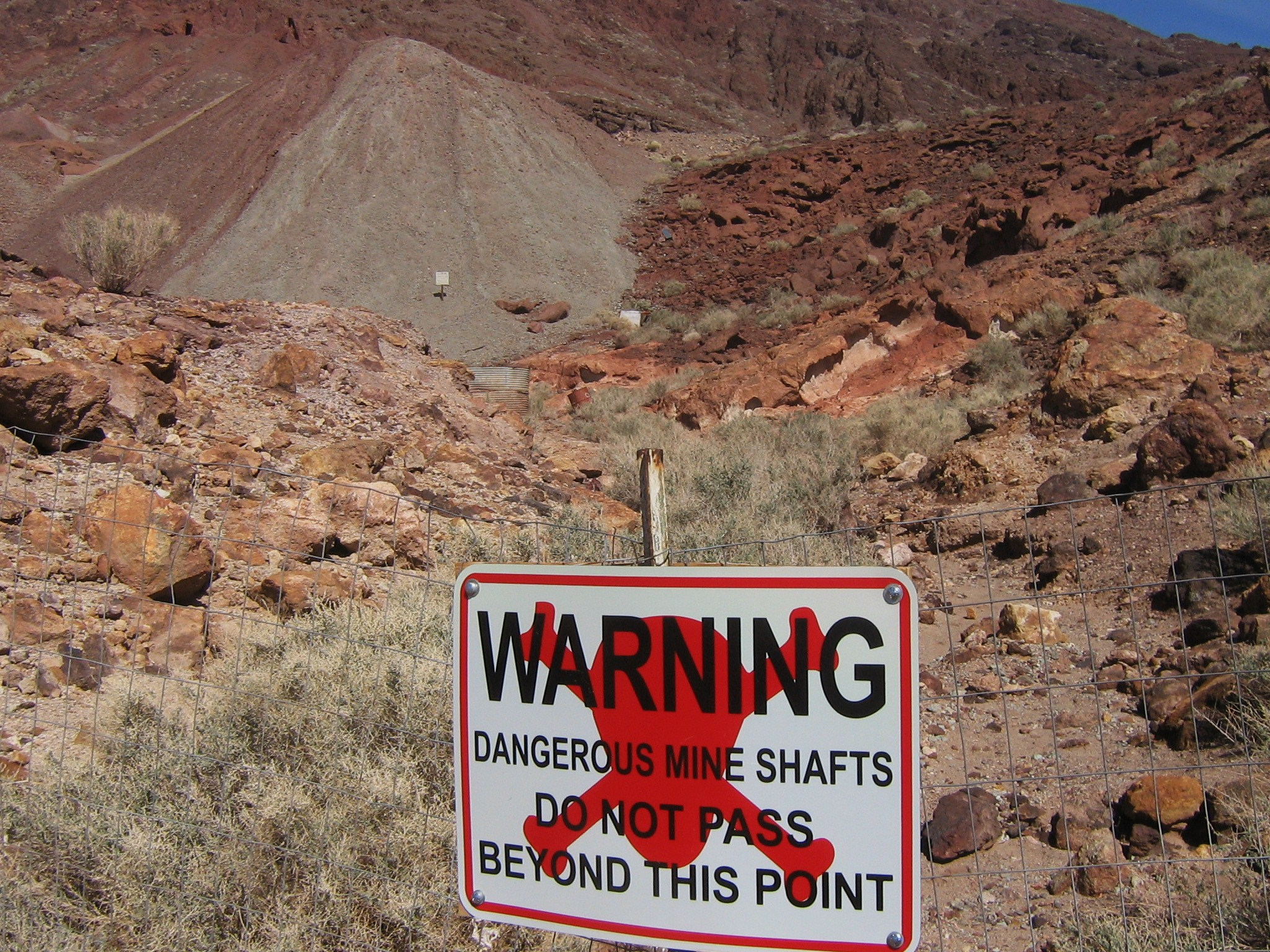
Warning sign near a dangerous area filled with open mineshafts, Calico Ghost Town, California.

There are upwards of 560,000 abandoned mines on public and privately owned lands in the United States alone. Abandoned mines may be dangerous to anyone who attempts to explore them without proper knowledge and safety training.

== Regulations ==
In the United States, the Mine Safety and Health Administration (MSHA) develops and enforces regulations to ensure mining safety. Additionally, the National Institute for Occupational Safety and Health (NIOSH) researches occupational health issues related to mining, which is a priority industry sector in the National Occupational Research Agenda (NORA). Several organizations impose self-assessments in efforts to ensure the safety of individual workers in compliance with these regulations; the Neil George Safety System was among the first of these programs established in the mining industry.

== See also ==
- Mining accident
- Escape respirator
