= Kaltan =

Kaltan Калтан
- Town
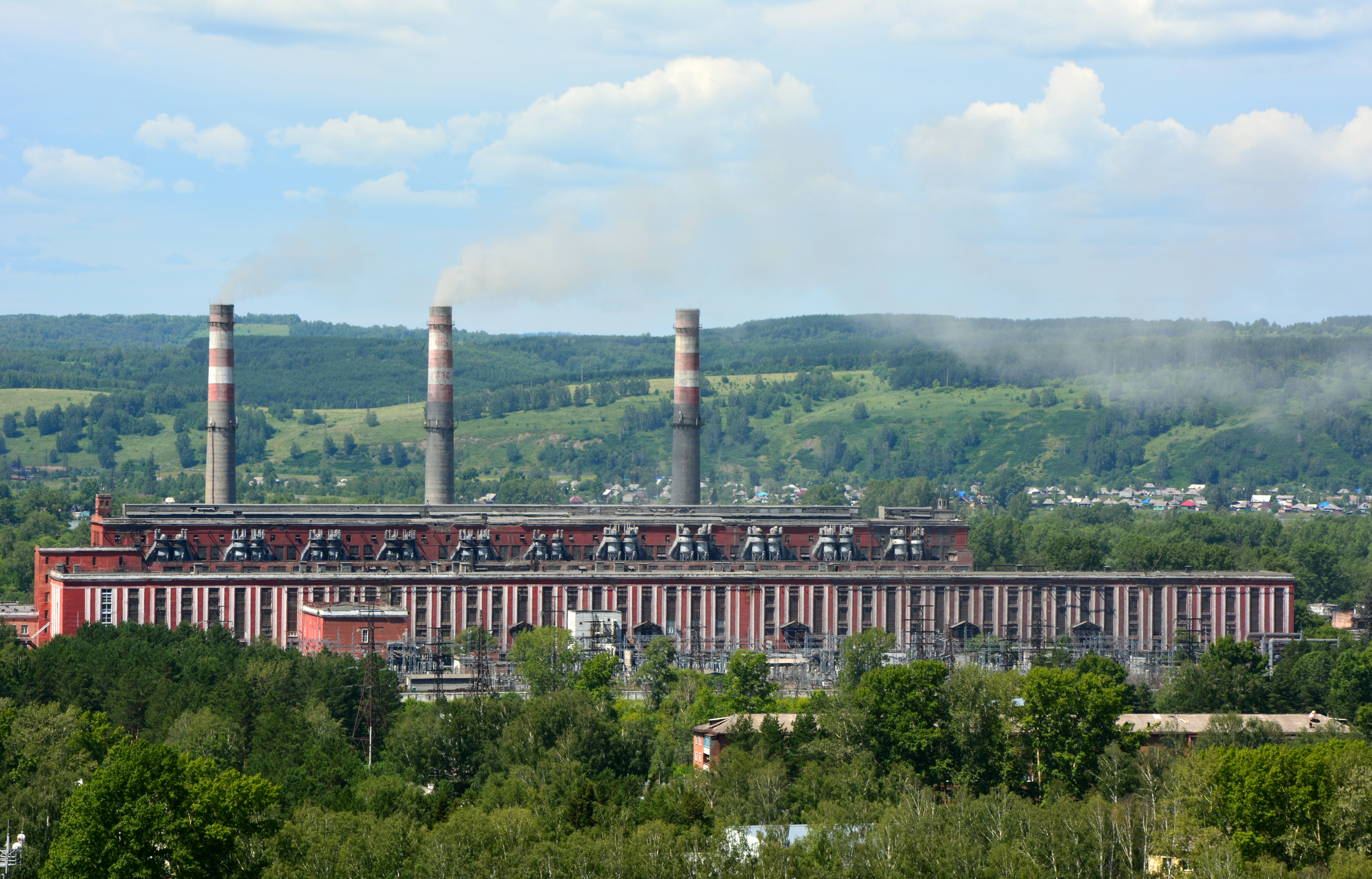
- South Kuzbass Power Plant, Kaltan

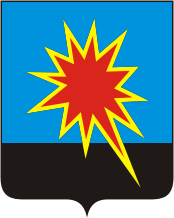
- Flag Coat of arms
- Interactive map of Kaltan
- Location of Kaltan Kaltan (Kemerovo Oblast)
- Coordinates: 53°31′N 87°17′E
- Country: Russia
- Federal subject: Kemerovo Oblast
- Founded: 1946
- Town status since: 1959
- Elevation: 225 m (738 ft)

Population (2010 Census)
  - Total: 21,892
  - Estimate (2025): 20,724 (−5.3%)

Administrative status
  - Subordinated to: Kaltan Town Under Oblast Jurisdiction
  - Capital of: Kaltan Town Under Oblast Jurisdiction

Municipal status
  - Urban okrug: Kaltansky Urban Okrug
  - Capital of: Kaltansky Urban Okrug
- Time zone: UTC+7 (MSK+4)
- Postal codes: 652740, 652741
- OKTMO ID: 32715000001
- Website: kaltan.net

Kaltan (Russian: Калта́н) is a town in Kemerovo Oblast, Russia, located on the Kondoma River, 338 kilometers (210 mi) south of Kemerovo, the administrative center of the oblast. Population: 21,892 (2010 census); 25,591 (2002 census); 25,369 (1989 Soviet census).

== History ==
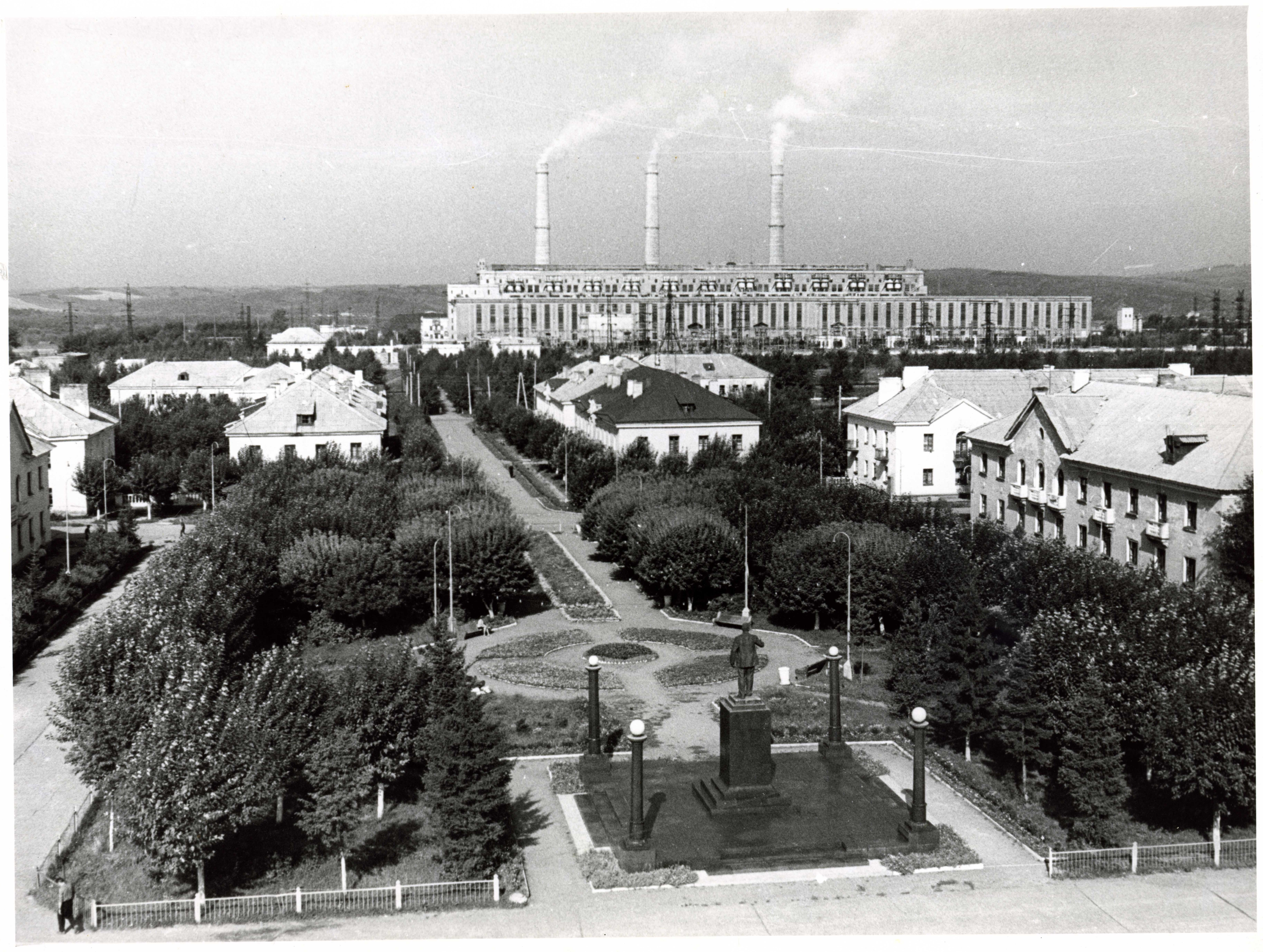
Kaltan in the 1960s

It was founded in 1946 and was granted urban-type settlement status in 1950 and town status in 1959.

== Administrative and municipal status ==
Within the framework of administrative divisions, it is, together with four rural localities, incorporated as Kaltan Town Under Oblast Jurisdiction—an administrative unit with the status equal to that of the districts. As a municipal division, Kaltan Town Under Oblast Jurisdiction is incorporated as Kaltansky Urban Okrug.
