= Yakutugol =

Russian coal company in Neryungri, Yakutia

- Industry: Coal
- Founded: 2002
- Headquarters: Neryungri, Yakutia
- Website: http://www.yakutugol.ru/en/en.php-sub=1&page=history.htm

OJSC KhK Yakutugol (Russian: Якуту́голь) is a Russian coal company located in Neryungri, Yakutia. Yakutugol was established in 2002 by the public offering of the State-owned SUE Yakutugol.

Mechel owns 100% of its shares since October 2007. Mechel bought 25% of the company shares at an auction in 2005 for US$410 million and the rest 75% on October 5, 2007 for 58 billion rubles (together with Elgaugol).

The company's General Director is Igor Khafizov.
