= Mezhdurechensky Urban Okrug =

Location of Mezhdurechensk Urban Okrug (Kemerovo Oblast)

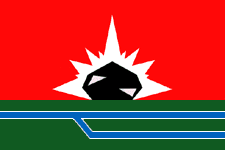
Flag of Mezhdurechensk Urban Okrug (Kemerovo Oblast)

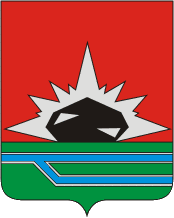
Coat of arms of Mezhdurechensk Urban Okrug (Kemerovo Oblast)

Mezhdurechensky Urban Okrug (Russian: Междуре́ченский городско́й о́круг) is a municipal formation (an urban okrug) in Kemerovo Oblast, Russia, one of the sixteen urban okrugs in the oblast. Its territory consists of the territories of two administrative divisions of Kemerovo Oblast—Mezhdurechensky District and Mezhdurechensk City Under Oblast Jurisdiction.

The urban okrug was established by the Law of Kemerovo Oblast #104-OZ of December 14, 2004.

== Geography ==
Verkhny Zub peak, the highest point of the oblast, is located in the eastern border of the district.
