= Vladimir Iorikh =

- Born: 1958 (age 67–68)
- Occupation: Businessman

Vladimir Iorikh or Vladimir Iorich or Vladimir Yorikh or Vladimir Yorich or Vladimir Jorikh or Vladimir Jorich (born 1958, Novokuznetsk, Soviet Union) is a Russian steel tycoon, president of the Swiss firm Conares Holding, which he formed in 1995, and founded the private equity and a venture capital Zug, Switzerland, based firm, Pala Investments, which was registered at St Helier in Jersey in 2006, with Jan Castro as the Managing Director of Pala Investments AG, which is the exclusive advisor to Pala in 2008. He claims that he is a German-Swiss tycoon who has nothing to do with Russia but controls uranium mining in the United States.

== Early life ==
Vladimir Iorikh graduated from the Kemerovo Polytechnic Institute (Russian: Кемеровский политехнический институт) at Kemerovo in Kuzbass, Soviet Union, in 1980 with a degree in engineering and economics.

== Career ==
Iorikh began his investment activity in the coal sector, but expanded his investments into other resource sectors with business partner, Igor Zyuzin. He made much of his initial fortune during the breakup of the Soviet Union. He was chief executive officer of Mechel (Russian: «Мечел») until he sold his stake in the company in 2006.

=== Mechel ===
From 1995 to 2004, he was CEO and, along with Igor Zyuzin, were equal shareholders holding a 42% stake in Mechel. In October 2004, the Mechel Steel Group, which was formed in 2003, had its IPO on the NYSE with Iorikh listed as its CEO. (Note: When the Mechel Steel Group was formed in 2003, it included the Mechel Metallurgical Plant, Korshunov GOK, Yuzhuralnickel, Southern Kuzbass Coal Holding, (Russian: входят металлургический комбинат "Мечел", Коршуновский ГОК, "Южуралникель", угольный холдинг "Южный Кузбасс") as well as a number of metallurgical plants in Russia and abroad.) Earlier in 2004, the Mechel Steel Group was listed on the Western stock exchange and increased its authorized capital by 30% with 76% of the new shares bought by the New York-based Deutsche Bank Trust Company Americas (DBTCA). In 2006, he sold his 42% stake in Mechel, which was the largest producer of special steel and alloys, to Zyuzin for about $1.5 billion and moved to the canton of Zug in Switzerland.

=== Pala ===
At the canton of Zug, known for its sparing tax system, he used money from his sale of his stake in Mechel in 2006 and founded the Zug, Switzerland, based firm Pala investment fund, which is now managed by his son Eugene. Pala invests in various concerns involving mining and metals including businesses that provide raw materials for the renewable energy and battery sectors including investments in gold, copper, tin, rare earth elements, cobalt, nickel, lithium and processing businesses.

==== Burundi ====
In early April 2015, Pala invested in Rainbow Rare Earths Ltd., which gained its mining license in March 2015 for 25 years with a renewal thereafter, to mine rare earth elements in Western Burundi at Gakara. The site at Gakara, which is located 20 kilometres (12 mi) south-southeast of Bujumbura, is the only known rare earth elements mine in Africa. Gakara has a 52-56% TREO of high-value rare earth concentrate and has low levels of radioactivity with Neodymium and praseodymium (NdPr) representing approximately 88% of the total while only containing 19.5% of the mass.

==== Türkiye ====
Pala holds a stake in Anatolia Minerals Development Ltd. According to CEO Ed Dowling, who heads the Colorado-based Anatolia Minerals Development Ltd. (AMDL), which is a junior gold miner listed on the TSX that is developing a gold mine in Türkiye, "Pala's focus is all about shareholder value. They invested in Anatolia with the expectation they are going to make money." The "Çöpler Deposit" mine that the Canadian gold mining company Alacer Gold, which Pala holds the largest stake, holds an 80% interest is located west of Çöpler, Erzincan, Turkey, and is 550 kilometres (340 mi) from Ankara in east-central Anatolia.

==== Western Australia ====
As of August 2017, Pala provided a large amount of financing to the Australian mining company Altura Mining Limited's Pilgangoora Lithium Project ('Altura Project'), which is owned by the firm Pilbara Minerals Limited, to develop a lithium-tantalum mine at Pilgangoora in Pilbara, Western Australia, which is 120 kilometres (75 mi) south of Port Hedland, Western Australia, and is 55 kilometres (34 mi) from Pilbara Minerals’ flagship Tabba Tabba Tantalum Project. The mine was placed on care and maintenance at the end of 2024 due to low lithium price.

==== Papua New Guinea ====
In 2019, his firm Pala gained control of Cobalt 27 and renamed it Nickel 28 Capital Corporation. In 2019, Cobalt 27 owned an 8.56% stake in the joint venture at Ramu on the north coast of Papua New Guinea near Madang. In 2018, Ramu produced 3,275 tonnes of cobalt and 35,355 tonnes of nickel, and the Metallurgical Corporation of China in 2012 financed, constructed, and commissioned the mine as a majority-owner and operator for $2.1 billion, which at the time was China’s largest overseas mining investment.

==== Canada ====
Through Pala Investments AG, which he controls through his indirect control of Pala Investments Holdings Ltd., he holds large stakes in rare earth elements in Canada. In 2006, Iorikh gained stakes through his investments in other resource-related Canadian firms such as Gemcom Software and Norcast Income Fund before they both went private.

In July 2007, Pala gained a stake in Neo, which is a Toronto based firm that produces, processes and develops neodymium-iron-boron magnetic powders, rare earth elements and zirconium based materials and applications using its Magnequench and AMR Performance Materials business divisions. Neo's products are processed near its raw material sources and its key markets including at plants in China and Thailand.

In Canada, Cobalt 27 had a cobalt stream on Vale’s Voisey’s Bay mine in Labrador and Newfoundland that gave Cobalt 27 a 32.6% portion of the mine’s production beginning in 2021. Pala will keep its ownership of the Voisey’s Bay stream and all the cobalt inventory. Cobalt 27 also has a 2% net smelter return at the Turnagain project in British Columbia, which is one of the largest undeveloped nickel-cobalt sulphide deposits in the world.

==== Nevada ====
In December 2021, Pala gained a stake in Nevada Copper Corp.

== Personal life ==
As of 2009, Iorikh holds Russian and German citizenship and lives in Switzerland.
