= Sibplaz =

Mining and metallurgy company in Russia

ZAO Sibplaz
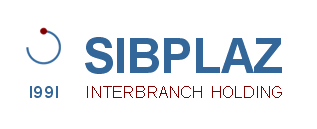
- Company type: Private (Closed joint stock company)
- Industry: Mining; Metallurgy
- Founded: 1996
- Headquarters: Kemerovo
- Key people: Konstantin Golosenko (Chairman); Igor Belousov (CEO)
- Products: Nickel, aluminium, zinc, lead, palladium, copper, platinum, gold, cobalt, selenium, tellurium, rhodium, silver, iridium, ruthenium, titanium, rare metals, coal, coke, mineral oil
- Revenue: ▼US$840 million (2009)
- Number of employees: 96,193

ZAO Sibplaz (Russian: СИБПЛАЗ) is one of Russian leading mining, metallurgical and chemical companies, producing coal, anthracite, coke, nickel, aluminium, zinc, lead, titanium, group of rare metals, and engaging in mineral oil and conducts oil production and gas exploration in Siberia. The company is headquartered in Kemerovo.

== History ==
Sibplaz was created in 1991 in system of the Russian academy of mining sciences, Scientific and technical mining association, Federal Official body "The National centre of science of mining - Institute of mining by name A.A.Skochinskogo" the Ministries of Energy of the Russian Federation, as specialized Siberian research establishment and the industrial organization for realization of research programs in the field of mining: effective extraction and processing fuel and energy and a mineral-source of raw materials, geological studying and reproduction of a mineral-raw-material base of minerals in the Russian Federation, the former countries of Soviet Union and abroad.

During re-structuring the Russian mining branches under control of establishment actives of the branch scientific research institutes, special design offices, the experimental and industrial enterprises mining, a machine-building and chemical structure are consolidated. Per 1996 it is transformed to a closed joint-stock company.

== Operations ==
Activities are concentrated in mining branch, chemistry, nonferrous metallurgy in Russia, 38% of actions are supervised by the state.

The portfolio of offers includes oil and mineral oil, natural gas (methane), coals of power and coked marks, anthracite, coke, nonferrous metals, polymetals, rare metals, the natural and synthesized minerals, over 2000 chemical compounds of high purity, the research equipment and analytical devices, the mountain-mine equipment and special equipment.

The organizations of group carry out a full cycle of work from scientific research, designing and designing before start-up of the enterprises and architectural supervision of their construction and work which production provides development of coal and mining branch, nuclear and alternative power, domestic electronics, instrument making, aviation, space-rocket technology, modern communication systems and navigation.

Structure Sibplaz - a combination fundamental and applied science, for realization of research programs at the industrial enterprises which in turn provide financing innovations and development of research works.
