= Ulyanovskaya Mine disaster =

2007 methane explosion in the Ulyanovskaya longwall coal mine, Kemerovo Oblast, Russia

Coordinates: 53.75°N 87.1167°E

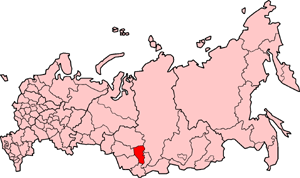
Location of Kemerovo Oblast, Russia

The Ulyanovskaya Mine disaster was caused by a methane explosion that occurred on March 19, 2007, in the Ulyanovskaya longwall coal mine in the Kemerovo Oblast. At least 108 people were reported to have been killed by the blast, which occurred at a depth of about 270 meters (885 feet) at 10:19 local time (3:19 GMT). The mine disaster was Russia's deadliest in more than a decade.

== Background ==
The operator of the mine is Yuzhkuzbassugol ("South Kuzbass Coal"), a half-owned associate of the Evraz Group conglomerate, which is Russia's largest producer of deep-mined coal. The mine, which opened in 2002, is one of the newest pits in the Kuzbass coal-mining region of Siberia, with modern equipment made in the UK and Germany.

It has been producing at an annual rate of about 1.5 million tonnes of coking coal concentrate.

== Accident ==
Kemerovo Oblast governor Aman Tuleyev said that when the blast occurred, "the mine was preparing to launch "Eighteen," an advanced mining safety system developed in the UK. The system signaled a sudden discharge of a large amount of methane and caving at 14:30 local time."

According to the Russian Prosecutor General's office, "the explosion occurred when equipment was being tested". The explosive agent is thought to have been either methane or coal dust. The main theory for the cause of the explosion is that it resulted from "a breach of mining safety". However, the mine operator has denied any connection between the explosion and the new equipment.

== Casualties ==
Among the dead was a British mining consultant, Ian Robertson, who worked for the Anglo-German company International Mining Consultancy. According to Russian sources, the company was involved in auditing the mine's coal reserves. He was accompanied by most of the mine's senior management, who had gone underground shortly before the explosion; the entire party was caught in the blast.

The audit was reportedly being conducted in conjunction with the mine operator's planned initial public offering of stock shares to obtain cash for a $700 million investment programme.

== Investigation ==
In the aftermath of the accident it was revealed that the mine had suffered "problems with equipment safety rules". It was also announced that 60 coal mines in the surrounding area were to be inspected for similar violations soon after the disaster, and that the entirety of the nation's mines would be inspected during the coming weeks.

Preliminary findings from the Ulyanovskaya investigation found that safety equipment had been tampered with deliberately to decrease the readings of methane levels in the mine. According to Governor Tulayev, this was done "consciously in order to increase coal production". Five mine inspectors were subsequently dismissed for allowing the mine operator to "breach safety rules in order to make a profit." The blast was said to have been caused by sparks from an exposed cable igniting methane gas, which then ignited coal dust.

== See also ==
- Listvyazhnaya mine disaster—25 November 2021, dust explosion, 52 killed
- Vorkuta mine disaster—25-29 February 2016, methane explosion, 36 killed
- Raspadskaya mine explosion—8 May 2010, 91 killed
- Yubileynaya mine—24 May 2007, methane explosion, 39 killed
