= Raspadskaya (company) =

Russian coal company

OJSC Raspadskaya
- Native name: ОАО Распадская
- Type: Public (OJSC)
- Traded as: MCX: RASP
- Industry: Mining
- Founded: 1973
- Headquarters: Mezhdurechensk, Kemerovo Oblast, Russia
- Number of locations: Kemerovo Oblast, Chelyabinsk Oblast
- Key people: Alexander Vagin (Chairman); Gennady Kozovoy (CEO)
- Products: Coal
- Revenue: ₽117 billion (2025)
- Operating income: ₽18.5 billion (2025)
- Net income: ₽−53 billion (2025)
- Total assets: ₽203 billion (2025)
- Total equity: ₽137 billion (2025)
- Owner: Corber Enterprises Limited (100%) (which 82% owned by Evraz)
- Number of employees: 7,863
- Website: www.raspadskaya.com

OJSC Raspadskaya (Russian: ОАО Распадская) is a Russia-based coal-mining company owned by Evraz (82%) and headquartered in Mezhdurechensk, Kemerovo Oblast. The company produces 7 million tons of coal per year (in 2012).

In addition to the main Raspadskaya coal mine, Russia's largest single underground mine, Raspadskaya group consists of about 20 industrial, transportation, infrastructure and financial enterprises. The company export to Ukraine and Eastern Europe and is in the process of actively exploring entry into the South-Asian markets.

== Structure ==
Raspadskaya Group includes the following companies:

- OJSC "Mezhdurechenskaya Coal Company-96" (MUK-96)
- CJSC Raspadskaya Koksovaya underground mine
- CJSC "Razrez-Raspadsky" open-pit mine
- CJSC Raspadskaya Preparation Plant
- Olzherasskoye Shaft-Sinking Unit, Tomusinskoye Cargo Handling Unit, Montazhnik Raspadskoy, Raspadskaya Joy, Puteets, Raspadsky Ugol
- Satkinsky ironworks (Satka, Chelyabinsk Oblast).

=== Raspadskaya coal mine ===
Raspadskaya's total resources were estimated at 1,461 million tons and total coal reserves at 782 million ton (JORC standards, according to IMC Consulting report as of June 2006, of which 22 million tons produced by 31 March 2008). Based on the volume produced in 2007, the reserves-to-production ratio amounts to about 55 years of production.
