= Yubileynaya mine =

Coal mine in Kemerovo, Russia

- Location within Kemerovo Oblast
- Location: Kemerovo Oblast, Russia; 53.862145°N 87.332382°E
- Products: Coal

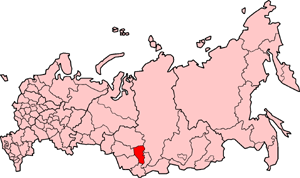
Location of Kemerovo Oblast, Russia

The Yubileinaya mine is a coal mine in the Kemerovo Oblast area of Siberia, Russia. The mine is operated by Joint-Stock Company "TopProm", owned by the Limited Liability Company "AVD-Capital"

== Explosion ==
On May 24, 2007, a methane explosion at the mine killed 38 miners and injured a further 7, one of whom subsequently died. Investigators believe that the explosion was caused by a spark from a damaged cable.

== See also ==
- Vorkuta mine disaster—25-29 February 2016, methane explosion, 36 killed
- Raspadskaya mine explosion—8 May 2010, 91 killed
- Ulyanovskaya Mine disaster—19 March 2007, methane explosion, at least 108 killed
