= Mezhdurechensk, Kemerovo Oblast =

City in Kemerovo Oblast, Russia

Mezhdurechensk Междуреченск
- City
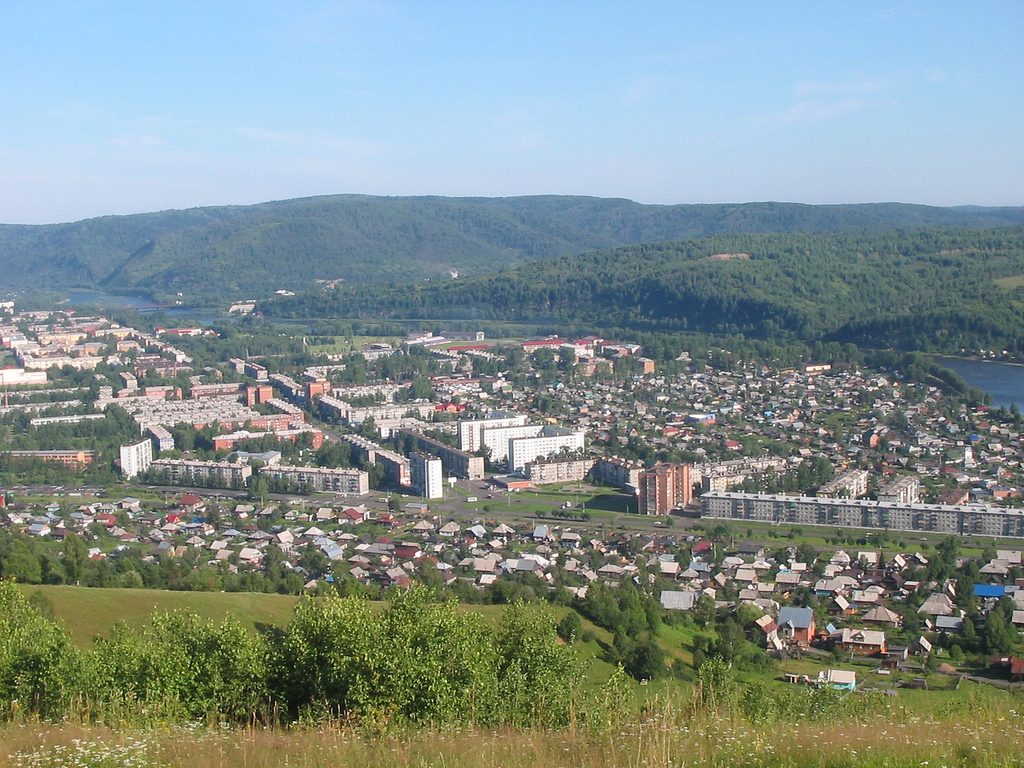
- Mezhdurechensk, July 2006

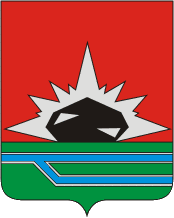
- Flag Coat of arms
- Interactive map of Mezhdurechensk
- Location of Mezhdurechensk Mezhdurechensk (Kemerovo Oblast)
- Coordinates: 53°41′11″N 88°04′13″E
- Country: Russia
- Federal subject: Kemerovo Oblast
- Founded: 1948
- City status since: 1955

Government
  - Head: Vladimir Chernov
- Elevation: 240 m (790 ft)

Population (2010 Census)
  - Total: 101,678
  - Estimate (2025): 94,435 (−7.1%)
  - Rank: 159th in 2010

Administrative status
  - Subordinated to: Mezhdurechensk City Under Oblast Jurisdiction
  - Capital of: Mezhdurechensky District, Mezhdurechensk City Under Oblast Jurisdiction

Municipal status
  - Urban okrug: Mezhdurechensky Urban Okrug
  - Capital of: Mezhdurechensky Urban Okrug
- Time zone: UTC+7 (MSK+4)
- Postal code: 652870
- Dialing code: +7 38475
- OKTMO ID: 32725000001
- Website: www.mrech.ru

Mezhdurechensk (Russian: Междуреченск, IPA: [mʲɪʐdʊˈrʲetɕɪnsk]; Shor: Суғаразы-тура, romanized: Suğarazı-tura) is a city in Kemerovo Oblast, Russia. Population: 101,678 (2010 census); 101,987 (2002 census); 107,014 (1989 Soviet census).

== History ==
It was established in 1948 and granted town status in 1955.

Aeroflot Flight 593 crashed near the city in 1994.

Victory Day celebrations were cancelled in the city after the nearby Raspadskaya mine explosion killed 91 people in 2010.

== Administrative and municipal status ==
Within the framework of administrative divisions, Mezhdurechensk serves as the administrative center of Mezhdurechensky District, even though is not a part of it. As an administrative division, it is incorporated separately as Mezhdurechensk City Under Oblast Jurisdiction—an administrative unit with a status equal to that of the districts. As a municipal division, the territories of Mezhdurechensk City Under Oblast Jurisdiction and of Mezhdurechensky District are incorporated as Mezhdurechensky Urban Okrug.

== Notable people ==
- Alexander Arbachakov, environmentalist
- Elmira Abdrazakova, Miss Russia 2013
- Sergei Kosmynin, European judo champion 1993 and 1994
- Arthur Kulkov, Russian male model
- Ilya Sorokin, Russian professional ice hockey goaltender for the New York Islanders
- Stepan Oganesyan, professional football player
- Pavlo Shylko, Ukrainian radio and television presenter. He was one of the presenters of the Eurovision Song Contest 2005.
