= Problems in coal mining =

There are several types of problems in coal mining. These include safety, faults, the water table, washout, thin seams, and split seams. Significant mining engineering and other industrial engineering goes into helping coal mining operations to deal with these challenges.

== Mine safety ==
Gases underground present hazards of asphyxiation and ignition, depending on which gases are present in each part of the mine. Mine ventilation is one of the many capital costs of extending the mine. Mines without good safety culture were often lethal to the workers in centuries past, and although the per capita rates of injuries and deaths are lower in modern mining, they are still nonzero. Cave-ins are another significant risk. Even workers who survive the risks from gases and cave-ins face a risk of coal workers' pneumoconiosis. Personal protective equipment lessens this risk, but maintaining adequate protection is not easy, especially as advancing mining technologies have made mechanized fracturing of the rock and coal more efficient on a per-worker basis, making more dust to control in tighter spaces and time frames. Mining accidents are not only human tragedies but also financially expensive to mining companies, making their prevention a priority.

== Faults ==
If the coal seam reaches a fault, the seam may be significantly displaced, depending on the type of fault and its offset. Machinery trying to mine the coal may not be able to reach the displaced seam, if the displacement is too large. Coal mines use a combination of boreholes and high-resolution seismic reflection data to identify the larger faults and avoid the most faulted areas at the mine planning stage.

== Water table ==
If the water table is too high, the mine will flood with water. While mining, water needs to be constantly pumped out and this is expensive.

== Washout ==
If a distributary or river changes course and cuts into the swamp material that will form coal, the coal seam is not fully formed and there may be a problem with mining it.

== Thickness of seams ==
If the seams are too thin it may be uneconomic to mine the coal. The cost of production could exceed the selling price.

== Splitting of seams ==
If the seam splits, due to a delta collapsing, sand and silt sediments pile up on top until that area is covered. This may make all or part of the coal seam uneconomic to mine as it is too thin.
