= Raspadskaya mine explosion =

2010 mine explosion in Russia

Coordinates: 53°41′N 88°03′E

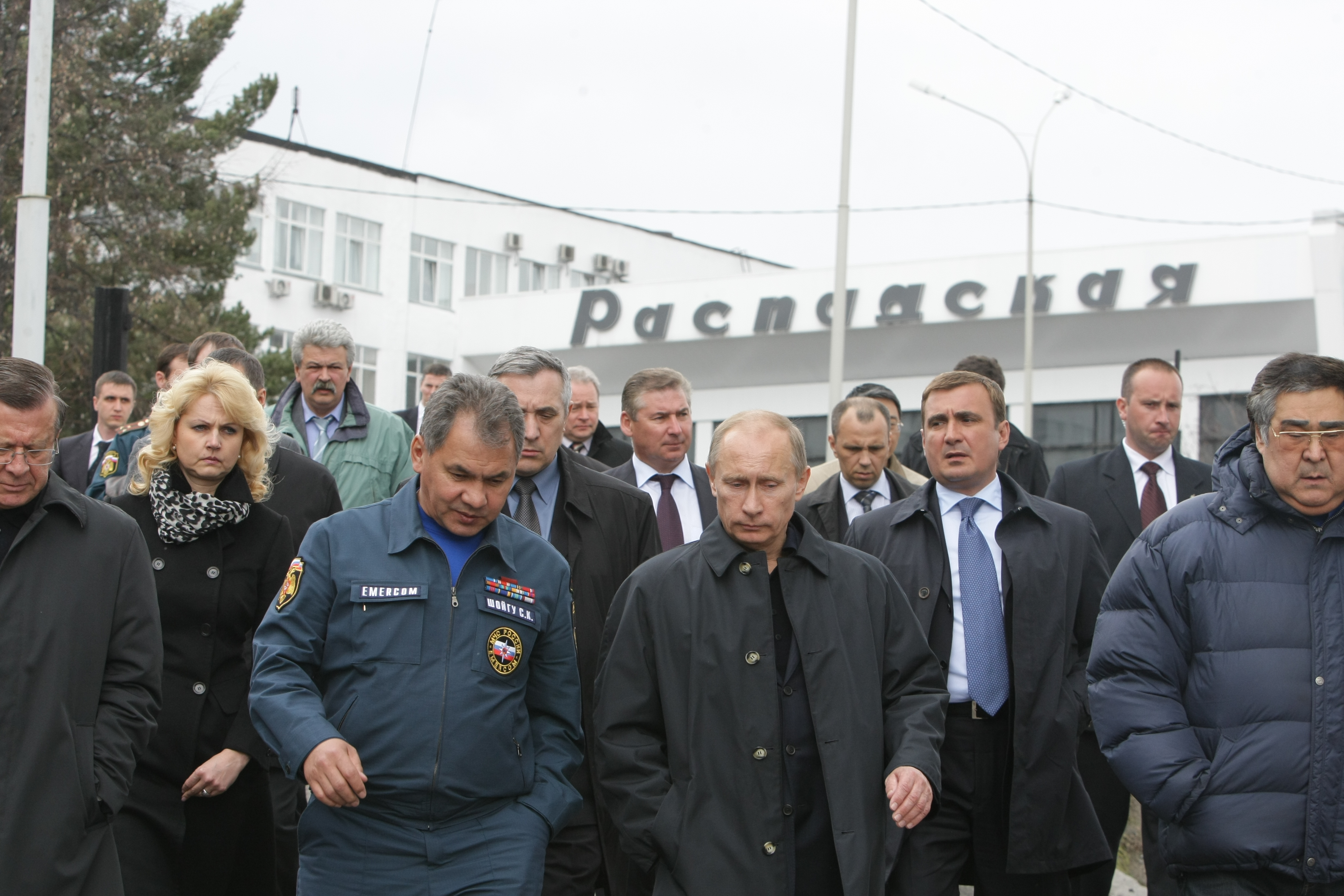
Vladimir Putin on 11 May 2010

The Raspadskaya mine explosion was a mine explosion in the Raspadskaya mine, located near Mezhdurechensk in Kemerovo Oblast, Russia, which occurred on 8 May 2010. It was believed to have been caused by a buildup of methane. The initial explosion was followed by a second approximately four hours later which collapsed the mine's ventilation shaft and trapped several rescue workers. By 18 May 2010, 66 people were confirmed to have died with at least 99 others injured and as many as a further 24 unaccounted for.

== History ==
The mine, owned by Russian company Raspadskaya, is the largest underground coal mine in Russia. It has a history of accidents and safety problems. In March 2001, another methane explosion killed four miners and injured six. The mine was shut down for two weeks in 2008 due to safety violations and a worker was killed after part of the mine collapsed in January 2010.

== Incident ==
The first blast occurred at 20:55 Moscow Summer Time (16:55 UTC) with the second at 01:00 MST (21:00 UTC). The explosions were confirmed by investigators to have been caused by methane gas. A secondary explosion was reported approximately four hours later, with 20 rescue workers now among those missing. The second explosion caused a collapse of the mine's ventilation shaft, drastically reducing the flow of fresh air into the mine.

Rescue efforts were suspended after the second blast. By 18 May 2010, 66 people were confirmed to have died, at least 99 injured and 24 remained trapped underground. Rescue work resumed late on May 9 after methane levels had dropped below safety limits and, at the peak of the operation, 560 people were involved with aid being sent from other parts of Russia.

== Aftermath ==
Aman Tuleyev, governor of Kemerovo Oblast, has taken charge of the rescue operation. The mine was evacuated after the first explosion and 282 people escaped to the surface. The Russian Energy Ministry has set up a task force to deal with the aftermath of the incident while President Dmitry Medvedev ordered a report from his emergencies minister and a junior energy minister, Vladimir Azbukin visited the scene. Medvedev ordered Prime Minister Vladimir Putin to head a government commission dealing with the aftermath of the incident.

The mine company agreed to pay 1 million Russian rubles in compensation (approximately US$ 33,000) to the families of the dead with additional assistance from the state. A government spokesman released a statement in which he said "families of the deceased, children of miners will get all the necessary assistance. The government has already discussed the issue with the mine's owners".

The event occurred the day before Victory Day and officials in the nearby town of Mezhdurechensk, where many of the mine's employees live, cancelled planned celebrations for the following day.

A criminal investigation was launched into the incident by Russian authorities and post-mortem examinations were carried out on the bodies of the miners to establish a precise cause of death.

The tragedy provoked civil unrest in nearby Mezhdurechensk. Coal miners rallied and occasionally clashed with police, 28 were arrested. Governor Tuleyev met with the protesters and agreed with some of their demands.

=== The appeal of "The Union of Kuznetsk Basin Residents" ===
On 16 May a new movement "The Union of Kuznetsk Basin Residents" issued an appeal to the President, the people of Russia and to those who live in the region. The authors made five demands: release the detained in the town of Mezhdurechensk, increase miners' minimum salaries threefold, stop persecution of the independent trade union, withdraw the police forces brought from other regions, and introduce monthly meetings of the town administration with the residents. The authors said that they would wait for the reply from the President until 21 May. Then, if their demands were not satisfied, they promised to start political actions.

The appeal appeared in blogs, including the specially created blog Golos Kuzbassa (lit. Voice of Kuzbass) and community Mezhdurechensk (later the community moderators deleted the text). It was also published by some mass media.

The State Duma deputy from the communists Nina Ostanina supported this appeal. According to her, if the region administration does not heed the demands of citizens, it may lead to events similar to those in Kyrgyzstan. The appeal was also supported by the Solidarnost movement and the All-Russian Strike Committee.

== See also ==
- Vorkuta mine disaster—25-29 February 2016, methane explosion, 36 killed
- Yubileynaya mine—24 May 2007, methane explosion, 39 killed
- Ulyanovskaya Mine disaster—19 March 2007, methane explosion, at least 108 killed
