= Neil George Safety System =

Safety self-assessment method

The Neil George Safety System (or 5-Point Safety System) is an occupational health and safety program developed for and used in underground mining. The system was developed in 1942 by Canadian engineer Neil George, who at the time was an employee of Inco Limited in Sudbury, Ontario. The program is used throughout Canada and internationally.

The program is made up of five components, described in one of its iterations as:

1. Check the entrance to work places.
2. Check that the working place and equipment are in good order.
3. Check that the job is being worked safely.
4. Discuss a topic of safety.
5. Do the employees know how to continue to work safely?

Points one through three are done by the employee, and verified by the supervisor upon arrival to the workplace. The fourth step is a safety discussion between the employee and the supervisor, while the fifth is a verification by the employee that they have the correct training, experience, and motivation to continue working safely. This is also verified by the supervisor prior to their leaving the workplace.

The general system of pre-task risk assessments has been developed independently multiple times, and as such variants on the Neil George Safety System appear under different names in different localities. A common generic name for the practice is "Take 5 for Safety".
