= Raspadskaya coal mine =

Coal mine in Russia

Coordinates: 53°47′01″N 88°04′58″E

Raspadskaya Coal Mine
- Interactive map of Raspadskaya Coal Mine
- Location: Mezhdurechensk, Kemerovo Oblast, Russia
- Products: Coking coal
- Company: Raspadskaya OAO
- Website: www.raspadskaya.com
- Acquired: 1973

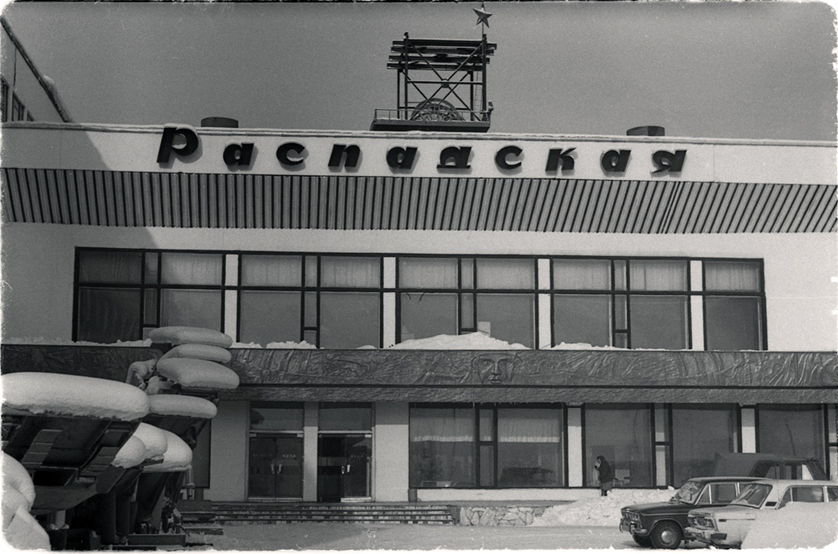
Raspadskaya. Foto 1984

The Raspadskaya Coal Mine is a coal mine located in Mezhdurechensk, Kemerovo Oblast, Russia. It is the largest coal and the largest underground mine in Russia. The mine was opened in 1973 and its construction was completed in 1977. In addition to the main underground mine, the mining complex also includes MUK-96 underground mine, Raspadskaya Koksovaya underground mine, and Razrez Raspadsky open-pit mine, as also the Raspadskaya preparation plant. The mine is the largest coal mine in Russia.

Raspadskaya's total resources were estimated at 1,461 million tons and total coal reserves at 782 million ton (JORC standards, according to IMC Consulting report as of June 2006, of which 22 million tons produced by 31 March 2008). Based on the volume produced in 2007, reserves-to-production ratio amounts to about 55 years of production. The complex produces 10% of Russia's coking coal.

The mine is owned and operated by Raspadskaya OAO, a Russian publicly listed coal company.

In March 2001, a methane explosion killed four miners and injured six. The mine was shut down for two weeks in 2008 due to safety violations and a worker was killed after part of the mine collapsed in January 2010. On 8 May 2010, an explosion occurred killing 66 workers.

In 2022, a remote sensing satellite found that the mine was releasing 87 metric tons, or 95 short tons, of methane each hour. Scientists who study methane leakage said the size was unprecedented. By contrast, the worst rate that occurred at the Aliso Canyon gas leak in California was 60 metric tons an hour.
