= Elga coal mine =

Coal mine in Russia

Elga Coal Mine
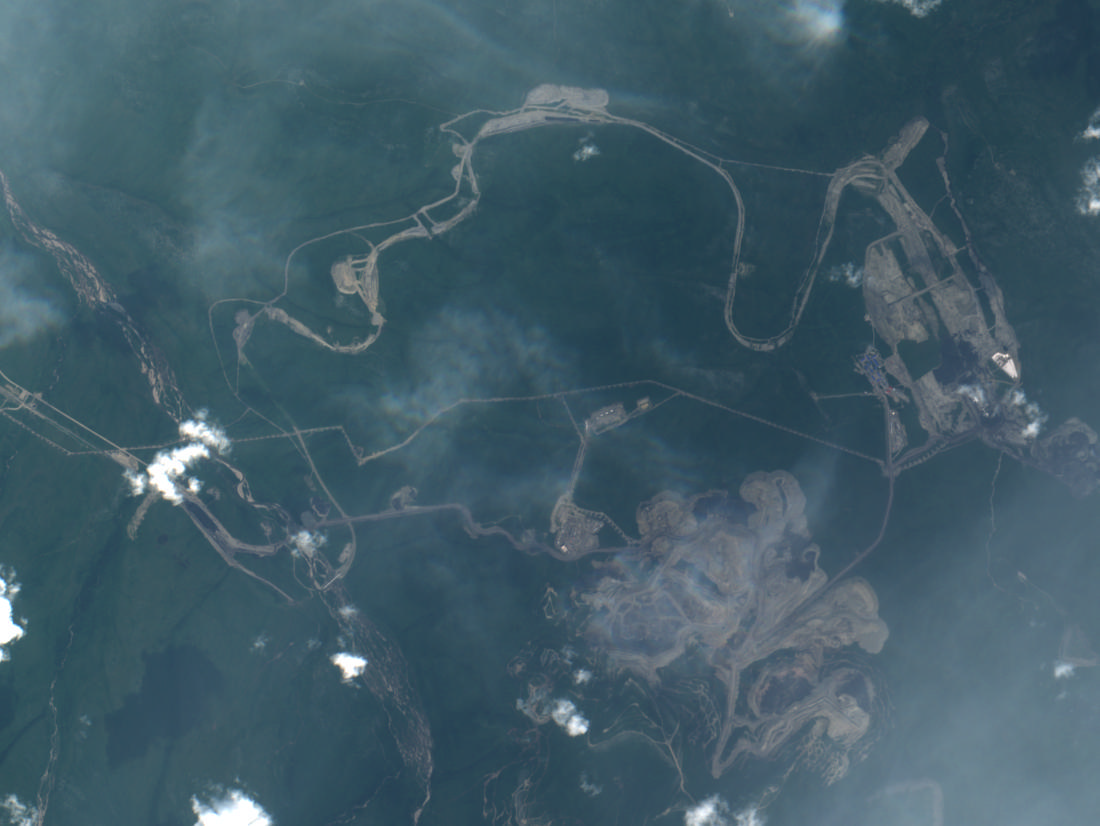
- Satellite image of coal mine (2019)

- Location in the Sakha Republic
- Location: Sakha Republic, Russia; 56°11′58″N 130°38′09″E
- Products: Coking coal

The Elga Coal Mine (Russian: Эльгинское угольное месторождение) is a coal mine located in Sakha Republic. The mine has coal reserves amounting to 2.1 billion tonnes of coking coal, one of the largest coal reserves in Asia and the world. The mine has an annual production capacity of 9 million tonnes of coal.

== Ulak — Elga railway line ==
The Ulak - Elga is a 360 km long railway line providing access to the largest coal deposit in the Russian Federation. Construction began in the year 2000, but was marred by lack of funds. The line was completed in 2011 and has since been upgraded a number of times, annual capacity being increased to 30Mt by 2023.

Ulak - Elga railway line map.

== Elga - Port Elga railway line ==
A 531km line will connect the mine to a new sea terminal at Port Elga (Khabarovsk Krai) on the Sea of Okhotsk (55°06'52.7"N 135°42'09.0"E). The line, under construction by the ElgaUgol company, is expected to start operations in 2025. Capacity of the new port will be 30Mt per year.
