= NLMK Pennsylvania =

American manufacturing company

- Company type: Subsidiary
- Industry: Steel manufacturing
- Predecessor: Sharon Steel Corporation, Sharon Coatings
- Founded: 2007 (as NLMK division)
- Headquarters: Farrell, Pennsylvania, United States
- Key people: Bob Miller (President, 2019)
- Products: Hot rolled steel, cold-rolled steel, galvanized steel
- Number of employees: 750 (2024)
- Parent: NLMK

NLMK Pennsylvania is a United States-based subsidiary of NLMK, a Russian steel company. Holdings include former assets of Sharon Steel Corporation, Duferco, and Sharon Coatings.

== History ==
=== Formation as division ===
In 2007, Sharon Coating LLC (formerly Sharon Steel Corporation) in Farrell was acquired in a joint venture by Russia’s Novolipetsk Steel, or NLMK, and Switzerland’s Duferco. In 2011, when NLMK and Duferco as a joint venture became involved in the Farrell plant, NLMK signed a labor agreement with the United Steelworkers for the facility. NLMK purchased the Farrell mill in 2014.

=== Tariff impact 2018-2021 ===
In 2018, US President Donald Trump implemented a significant steel tariff of 25% on Russia. The tariffs impacted the NLMK Pennsylvania plant in Farrell, which had 750 workers at the time, and imported raw steel slabs from Russia almost exclusively. NLMK applied for an official exemption in March 2018, arguing there were limited slabs available on the market. In July 2019, up to 100 United Steelworker employees were laid off from the Farrell plant, with NLMK's president blaming steel tariffs.

In 2019, Bob Miller was NLMK Pennsylvania president, overseeing the company's steel plant in Farrell, with 600 employees, and the 150 employees at Sharon Coatings in Sharon. That year, Miller said the company had paid $160 million in tariffs to keep local operations running, and had suspended a $600 million upgrade. In December 2020, the US agreed to refund a significant portion of the import tariffs to NLMK USA, plus interest. At the Farrell mill, in 2020 and early 2021, workers with the United Steelworkers of America went on a six month strike. A new four-year labor contract was signed by NLMK Pennsylvania in March 2021.

=== Retooling ===
In 2023, Sharon Steel was still owned by NLMK Pennsylvania, a division of NLMK Group in Russia.

In 2024, NLMK revealed a new walking beam furnace at the plant in Farrell, which had 750 employees. The furnace was manufactured by Tenova. Plans to install the furnace dated back to 2006 when Duferco Corp. operated the plant, but it was never given final approval. It was revisited when NLMK purchased the mill in 2014.

In May 2024, Cleveland-Cliffs Inc. was in talks to acquire the US Midwest assets of Novolipetsk Steel PJSC. At the time, NLMK Pennsylvania's Farrel plant was its largest facility, producing hot rolled and cold rolled coils, and galvanized products. At the time, NLMK's owner Vladimir Lisin was not sanctioned by the US, UK, or EU.

== See also ==
- Mergers and acquisitions in the United States steel industry
