= Sharon Steel Corporation =

Defunct American steel company

- Industry: Steel manufacturing
- Predecessor: Sharon Steel Hoop
- Founded: 1936
- Founder: Frank Buhl
- Fate: Bankrupt

Sharon Steel Corporation was an American steel company. Chairmen included Henry A. Roemer and later, Victor Posner. After it went bankrupt in the late 1980s, in late 1992, Sharon Steel Corp. was purchased by Caparo Steel. After a second banktrupcy in 1994, in 2007, Sharon Coating LLC (formerly Sharon Steel Corp.) in Farrell, Pennsylvania was acquired in a joint venture by Russia’s Novolipetsk Steel (NLMK) and Switzerland’s Duferco.

== History ==
=== Sharon Steel Hoop ===
Frank H. Buhl and associates broke ground for the Sharon Steel Co. plant in 1900 in the City of Farrell, Pennsylvania. Sharon Steel Hoop, American Sheet and Tin Plate and the American Steel and Wire companies opened plants nearby, leading to population growth in the Shenango Valley. During the late 1920s, the four plants of U.S. Steel and Sharon Steel Hoop employed around 10,000 workers.

=== Sharon Steel Corporation ===
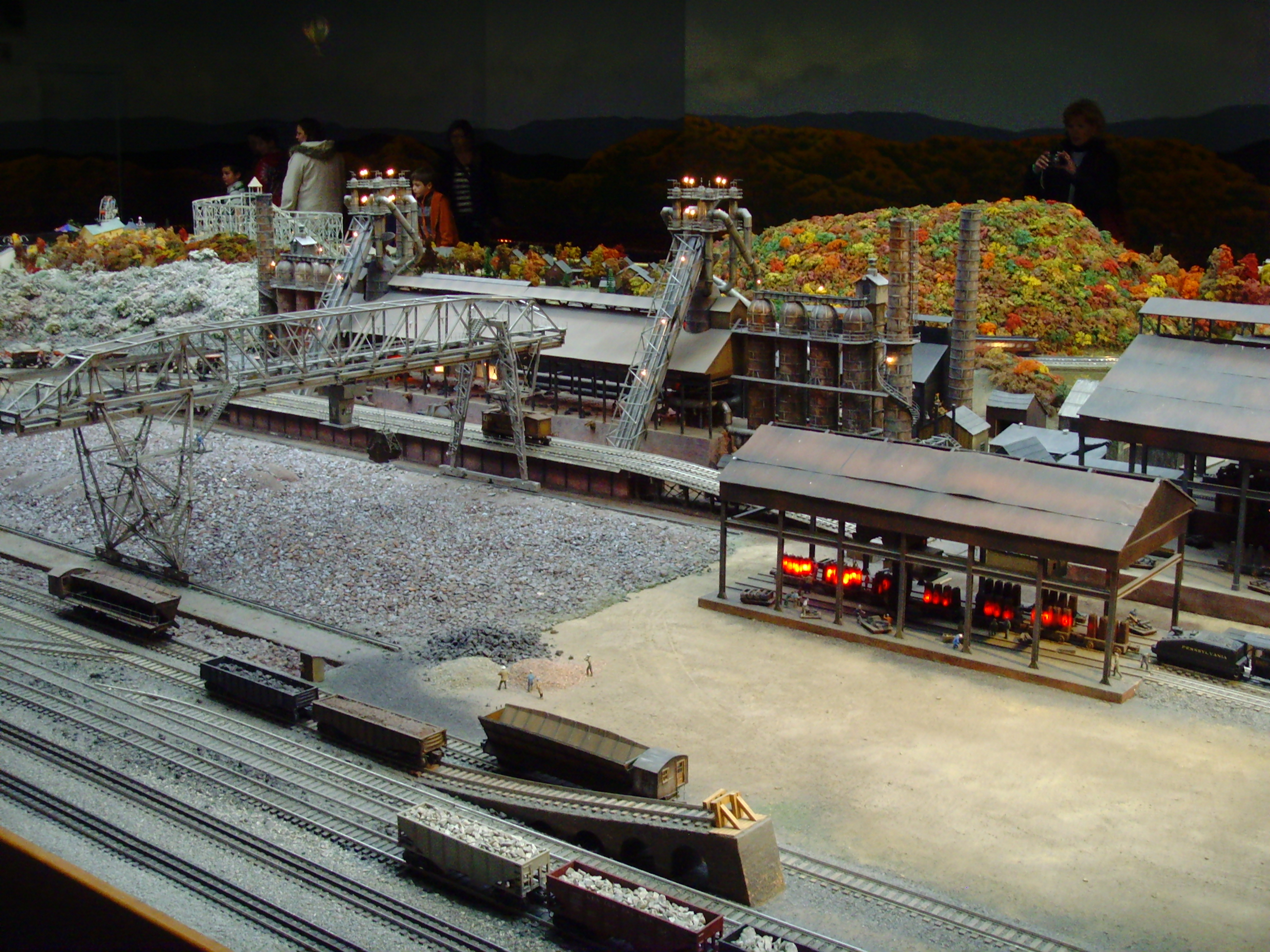
A steel mill replica called the Carnegie Steel Company at the Carnegie Science Center in Pittsburgh. The display is based on the original Sharon Steel Mill in Farrell, Pennsylvania.

Its predecessor company was the Sharon Steel Hoop Company. In March 1936, $6 million of issues was used to finance Sharon Steel by a banking group headed by Speyer Co. and Hemphill, Noyes Co. In 1953, Henry A. Roemer was chairman of Sharon Steel Corporation.

In the late 1960s, the Farrell mill had around 10,000 employees, operating melt shops, blast furnaces, and open hearths. At the mill, which was originally named the Carnegie-Illinois Steel Corp., Sharon Steel for 60 years operated an integrated steel mill in the location, creating steel used in Army helmets during World War II. According to the Sharon Herald, as " foreign competition mounted, Sharon Steel found itself the victim of low steel prices and ownership that didn’t modernize the plant [in Farrell]."

Sharon Steel Corporation closed a plant that employed 1,100 workers in Lowellville, Ohio in 1960, with all workers fired. In 1977 the 500 acres were owned by Gennaro Paving, while the mill itself had been dismantled for scrap. In 1964, Sharon Steel was utilizing the basic oxygen steelmaking process in its manufacturing, including at its mill in Sharon, Pennsylvania.

Under chairman Victor Posner, in January 1981, Sharon Steel Corporation held 5.1 percent of the GAF Corporation common stock. That May, Sharon Steel sold its holdings in Foremost-McKesson for a substantial profit. In 1983, Posner was serving as both CEO and chairman of Sharon Steel. After going in debt $145 million in 1984 during a downturn in the steel industry, in 1985, Sharon Steel lost $64 million, at which point it had a negative net worth of $197 million. In 1986, it was reported that Sharon Steel was in default on bond interest payments and that it was considering seeking protection from creditors. At the time, it was 86% owned by the company NVF, which in turn was largely owned by Posner and Posner's family. In 1987, it was the 12th largest steel producer in the United States. Posner was "ousted" as chairman in 1988, according to Reuters.

=== Bankruptcies ===
It first filed for bankruptcy in April 1987. When the company emerged from bankruptcy protection in November 1990, it was owned by the Castle Harlan Group. In May 1992, Sharon Steel was based in Farrell, Pennsylvania and employed around 2,700 people. Financial losses forced the company to close in November 1992, and later that month file for bankruptcy a second time. In November 1992, the company laid off its last 500 unionized employees. Around 100 employees remained. In response to filing for Chapter 11 Bankruptcy, it closed its large mill in Farrell in November 1992, as well as two steel finishing operations in Howard, Ohio. On July 20, 1993, the company announced that its main mill and two smaller operations would be permanently closed. The United Steelworkers of America had pushed for the designation of permanent closure to allow pension payments to 720 fired Sharon Steel workers. The workers who had been employed by Sharon Steel for at least 20 years were to receive pensions, while another 900 fired workers were without, according to the union.

Under state law Act 47, Farrell was declared distressed after Sharon Steel, then its largest employer, filed for bankruptcy. As the first town in Pennsylvania to be given that classification, the town was afforded a loan of $650,000 from the state of Pennsylvania.

=== Caparo and Duferco ownership ===
After shutting its operations, Sharon Steel was unable to convince the bankruptcy court to resume production, and was sold in December 1994 to Caparo Steel, a division of Caparo Group in the United Kingdom. The Farrell plant was renamed Caparo Steel Co. and steel production resumed using an electric furnace, while the blast furnace was demolished as scrap.

In 1998, after more financial trouble, much of the steel equipment in the Farrell mill was sold to Duferco Group, and it was renamed Duferco Farrell Corp. The sale did not include the electric furnaces. Duferco, based in Switzerland, continued to employ several hundred employees at the mill in Farrell.

In 2006, it was reported that demolition workers had failed to bring down an abandoned building at the old Sharon Steel mill, while it was being cleared for redevelopment. The electric arc melt furnace building withstood two major demolition attempts in several weeks. The electric furnaces had been run by Caparo until 1998, when it ceased production.

=== NLMK Pennsylvania ownership ===
In 2007, Sharon Coating LLC (formerly Sharon Steel Corp.) in Farrell was acquired in a joint venture by Russia’s Novolipetsk Steel (NLMK), and Switzerland’s Duferco. In 2011, when NLMK and Duferco as a joint venture became involved in the Farrell plant, NLMK signed a labor agreement with the United Steelworkers for the facility. NLMK purchased the Farrell mill in 2014, and Sharon Steel became owned by NLMK Pennsylvania, a division of NLMK Group in Russia.

In 2018, US President Donald Trump implemented a significant steel tariff of 25% on Russia. NLMK applied for an official exemption in March 2018, and in July 2019, up to 100 United Steelworker employees were laid off from the Farrell plant, with NLMK's president blaming steel tariffs. In 2019, the steel plant in Farrell had 600 employees, and the 150 employees at Sharon Coatings in Sharon. In December 2020, the US agreed to refund a significant portion of the import tariffs to NLMK USA, plus interest. At the Farrell mill, in 2020 and early 2021, workers with the United Steelworkers of America went on a six month strike. A new four-year labor contract was signed by NLMK Pennsylvania in March 2021.

Caparo Group owns the land next to Duferco, and demolished a number of antiquated Sharon Steel buildings around 2024.

In May 2024, NLMK Pennsylvania's Farrell plant was its largest facility, producing hot rolled and cold rolled coils, and galvanized products. That year, a new walking beam furnace came into use at the plant in Farrell, which had 750 employees.

== Mills and facilities ==
=== Midvale, Utah ===
Concerning funding the cleanup of the Sharon Steel tailings site in Midvale, Utah, in 1990, the largest Superfund cleanup settlement ever made with a company in bankruptcy court was announced. The settlement was between Sharon Steel, the EPA, and the state of Utah. The Sharon Steel Corp. Superfund site in Midvale was on a list by the EPA to potentially be reopened to the public in 2018, under EPA head Scott Pruitt.

=== Fairmont coke works ===
Sharon Steel operated a large works site in Fairmont, West Virginia, dubbed the Sharon Steel / Fairmont Coke works site. It had been built in 1918 by the Standard Oil Co. of New Jersey, and in 1948, purchased by Sharon Steel. It closed in May 1979. Sharon had been facing $300 million in federal fines for pollution, although, in 1982, the EPA agreed to drop the fines if Sharon handled the hazardous waste cleanup itself. In June 1983, Fairmont officials passed an ordinance targeted at Sharon, which banned the permanent disposal of hazardous waste in the city limits. Sharon contested the law to higher courts, arguing it preempted state and federal regulations. In 1985, a judge gave the company an order to control its pollution in Fairmont. It was placed on the Superfund list in 1996.

== See also ==
- The Wendy's Company
- Baldwin S-8
- 1952 steel strike
- List of Superfund sites in West Virginia
