= Loans for shares scheme =

Russian fraudulent privatization scheme

Beginning in 1995, Boris Yeltsin's government began privatizing state-owned shares in companies through a loans for shares scheme. The scheme helped with "fundraising" for Yeltsin's 1996 reelection campaign and restructuring freshly-sold companies at the same time (in order to outweigh communist sympathizers as one source speculated).

Russian bankers constituted the majority of those who have provided the funds (see Letter of thirteen). The rest included such entities as Stolichny bank (Russian: Столичный банк) and World Bank (who made a loan for a small percentage of the Sibneft oil company) and even some targeted investments from USAID in assistance to Chubais, according to Richard Morningstar, a U.S. aid coordinator for the former Soviet Union.

The scheme was primarily overseen by Anatoly Chubais who was linked to USAID program managed by head of the Harvard Institute for International Development (HIID) at the time.

The scheme implementation ultimately resulted in the emergence of an influential class of enterprise owners, known as Russian oligarchs.

== Enterprises lease ==
To make companies whose shares were sold by the government profitable, the new investors sought to restructure them and install a western-style management approach by eliminating communist bureaucracy. However, that required them to push out entrenched managers with communist allegiances (so-called "red directors"). This had already become an immensely more cumbersome task once the communists took control of Russia's legislature in the 1995 elections and would be made excruciatingly challenging if the communists were to take control of Russia's executive government. Consequentially, in order for the companies to turn a profit, investors felt that the Communists would need to lose the election. The auctions were rigged and lacked competition, being largely controlled by favored insiders with political connections or used for the benefit of the commercial banks themselves.

== Investors lock in ==
The scheme was structured in a manner that made Yeltsin's victory a strong interest of the investors involved. The two-stage program was structured so that the loans would be allocated before the election, but the auction of the shares could only take place after the election, making it of financial concern for them that Yeltsin would win the election.

On August 31, 1995, Yeltsin held an initial meeting attended by ten Russian business moguls about banking issues. In his remarks, Yeltsin made comments about his belief that the banks should have a political role. "Russian bankers take part in the country’s political life. … The banks, like all of Russia, are learning democracy."

The loans-for-shares auctions in November–December 1995 allowed the more conspicuous of "the oligarchs", as they were now known, to reposition as captains of industry. Initially dreamt up by Vladimir Potanin of Oneximbank, this privatization scheme was backed by Chubais but also by Kremlin conservatives like Oleg Soskovets, who was the one to get Yeltsin's signature on it. At bargain-basement prices, Potanin picked up Norilsk Nickel, the world's number one smelter of palladium and nickel, and he, Mikhail Khodorkovskii of Menatep, and Boris Berezovskii acquired the oil giants Sidanco, Yukos, and Sibneft.

== Loans-for-shares ==
In 1995, facing severe fiscal deficit and in desperate need of funds for the 1996 presidential elections, the government of Boris Yeltsin adopted a "loans-for-shares" scheme proposed by banker Vladimir Potanin and endorsed by Chubais, then a deputy prime minister, whereby some of the largest state industrial assets (including state-owned shares in Norilsk Nickel, Yukos, Lukoil, Sibneft, Surgutneftegas, Novolipetsk Steel, and Mechel) were leased through auctions for money lent by commercial banks to the government. As neither the loans nor the leased enterprises were returned in time, this effectively became a form of selling, or privatizing, state assets at very low prices.

"[T]he reforms of the 1990s were mainly the work of the advisers brought in under then president Boris Yeltsin. Fearing that the population might soon have a change of heart and turn its back on reform, Yegor Gaidar and Anatoly Chubais, the chief Russian architects of the process, decided to accelerate it, selling off state resources and enterprises at little or no charge. Not long into the process, ownership of some of Russia's most valuable resources was auctioned off by oligarch-owned banks under a scheme called "Loans for Shares." Although they were supposedly acting on behalf of the state, the bank auctioneers rigged the process-and in almost every case ended up as the successful bidders. This was how Khodorkovsky got a 78 percent share of ownership in Yukos, worth about $5 billion, for a mere $310 million, and how Boris Berezovsky got Sibneft, another oil giant, worth $3 billion, for about $100 million. [...] [T]he government was generally unable to exercise much control. Since the state was very weak, these "new Russians" paid little or no taxes on their purchases."

— Marshall Goldman, Professor of economics and associate director of Russian Studies at Harvard.

"Much of the second wave of privatization that did take place—in particular, the "loans-for-shares" scheme, in which major Russian banks obtained shares in firms with strong potential as collateral for loans to the state—turned into a fraudulent shambles, which drew criticism from many"

— John Nellis, Center for Global Development

A "less cynical" interpretation was proposed by Professor of political science and international studies, Russell Bova, who offered as an alternative, that Chubais may have been motivated by concerns that privatization would fail, that in the face of mid-1990s economic difficulty, the country might revert towards a Communist resurgence if progress was not maintained, and that in light of these concerns, the long term political goals of democratization and asset distribution from state hands to private ownership might have been deemed more important than possible short term gains from the asset sales: "[I]f that meant undervaluing State assets then so be it".

=== Loans-for-shares auctions held in Russia in November-December 1995 ===
| Date | Company | Share, % | Funds received in the budget, million USD | Auction winners |
|---|---|---|---|---|
| November 17, 1995 | Norilsk Nickel | 51 | 170.1 | ONEXIM Bank |
| November 17, 1995 | North-Western River Shipping Company | 25.5 | 6.05 | MFK Bank |
| November 17, 1995 | JSC «Mechel» | 15 | 13 | TOO «Rabikom» |
| December 7, 1995 | Lukoil | 5 | 141 | NK "LUKoil" and Imperial Bank |
| December 7, 1995 | Sidanco (now TNK-BP) | 51 | 130 | MFK Bank (effectively a consortium of MFK and «Alfa Group») |
| December 7, 1995 | Novolipetsk Steel | 14.87 | 31 | MFK Bank (effectively «Renaissance Capital») |
| December 7, 1995 | Murmansk Shipping Company | 23.5 | 4.125 | ZAO «Strateg» (effectively MENATEP Bank) |
| December 8, 1995 | YUKOS | 45 | 159 | ZAO «Laguna» (effectively MENATEP Bank) |
| December 11, 1995 | Novorossiysk Shipping Company (Novoship) | 20 | 22.65 | Novorossiysk Shipping Company (Novoship) |
| December 28, 1995 | Sibneft | 51 | 100.3 | ZAO «Oil Financial Company» (guarantor — Capital Savings Bank) |
| December 28, 1995 | Surgutneftegas | 40.12 | 88.9 | NPF «Surgutneftegas» (guarantor — ONEXIM Bank) |
| December 28, 1995 | JSC «Nafta-Moskva» | 15 | 20.01 | ZAO «NaftaFin» (effectively the management of the enterprise itself) |

== Consequences ==
The scheme has been perceived by many as unfair and fraudulent, and it is the loans-for-shares scheme that gave rise to the class of Russian business oligarchs, who have concentrated enormous assets, further increasing the wealth gap in Russia and contributing to political instability. In the medium term, this scheme impeded Russian growth; the oligarchs, realizing that their purchases could be seen as fraudulent by future governments, attempted to strip assets from the government enterprises rather than build them up.

== See also ==
- Privatization in Russia
