= Bull Moose Party =

American political party (1912–1920)

Progressive Party
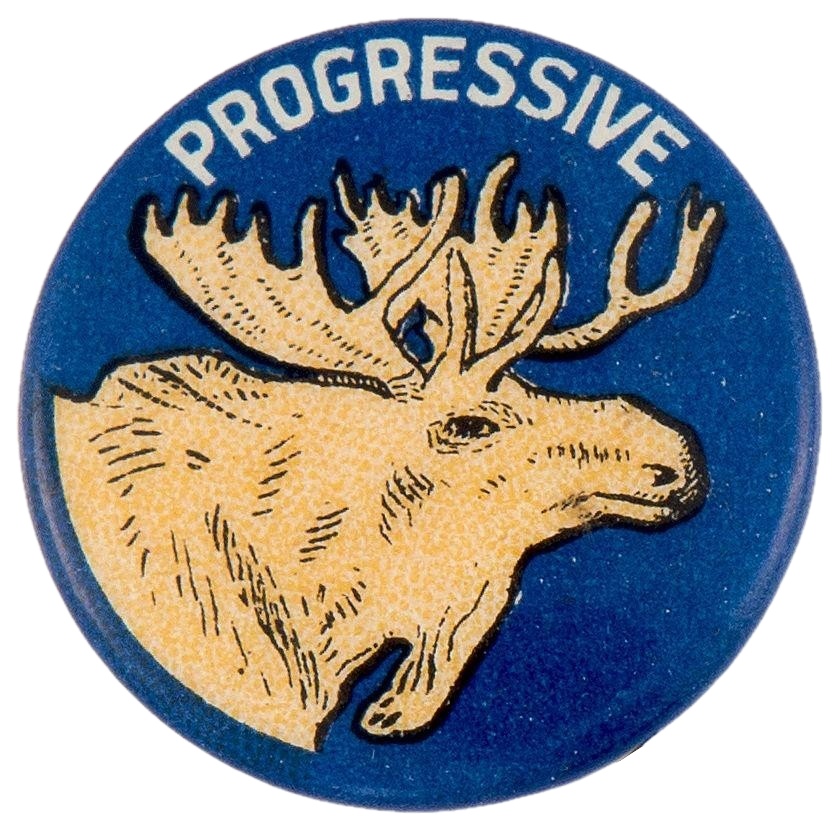
- Campaign pin featuring a bull moose, the party's mascot
- Chair: Theodore Roosevelt
- Founded: 1912; 114 years ago
- Dissolved: 1920; 106 years ago
- Split from: Republican Party
- Preceded by: Lincoln–Roosevelt League
- Merged into: Republican Party (majority)
- Succeeded by: California Progressive Party
- Headquarters: Washington, D.C., U.S.
- Ideology: Progressivism (US); Radicalism (US); New Nationalism
- Political position: Center-left to left-wing
- Colors: Red
- Senate (1913–1915): 1 / 96 (peak)
- House of Representatives (1913–1915): 9 / 435 (peak)

The Progressive Party, also known as the Bull Moose Party, was a United States third party formed by supporters of former president Theodore Roosevelt to act as an independent vehicle for his campaign for the 1912 presidential election. After losing the presidential nomination of the Republican Party to incumbent William Howard Taft at the 1912 Republican National Convention, Roosevelt's supporters nominated him on the Bull Moose ticket in every state except Oklahoma. Its nickname comes from a statement Roosevelt made following his loss at the 1912 convention, boasting that he felt "strong as a bull moose." The party attracted progressives, reformers, and classical radicals. In addition to Roosevelt, it also fielded candidates for United States Congress and state and local office through the 1910s. After Roosevelt's defeat, however, the party went into rapid decline and dissolved shortly after his death in 1919.

Historians and critics generally regard the party as having been reliant on a cult of personality around Roosevelt and as having had a spoiler effect, splitting the Republican Party and resulting in landslide victories for the opposition Democratic Party. The party platform was built on Roosevelt's Square Deal domestic program and his call for a "New Nationalism," asserting that "the first task of the statesmanship of the day" was "to dissolve the unholy alliance between corrupt business and corrupt politics." The platform included proposals for campaign finance restrictions, tariff reform, social insurance, direct democracy, an eight-hour workday and women's suffrage. Although Roosevelt finished ahead of Taft in the 1912 election, both finished well behind Democratic nominee Woodrow Wilson, who won the presidency with a plurality of the popular vote. Though several Progressives were elected to Congress or state offices, the party never achieved a role in national government, and Roosevelt was blamed by many Republicans for Wilson's election. Efforts to merge the Republicans and Progressives were abandoned in 1916, after Roosevelt himself rejoined the Republican Party and urged his supporters to vote for Charles Evans Hughes. Roosevelt died in 1919, and by 1920, the party no longer existed as a national organization.

Despite its brief history and relatively disappointing electoral results, the party established a strong historical legacy in United States politics. Many former members went on to successful political careers within the American two-party system, particularly during the New Deal era and presidency of Franklin D. Roosevelt. Since its dissolution, many independent American third parties have also adopted the Progressive banner, if not its platform, including the national Progressive Party of 1924, National Progressives of America, and Progressive Party of 1948. Local parties sharing its name, including the Wisconsin Progressive Party and Vermont Progressive Party, have also had state and local electoral success.

== History ==
=== Republican Party split (1910–12) ===
Theodore Roosevelt was president of the United States as a member of the Republican Party from 1901 to 1909. During the later years of his presidency, he became increasingly supportive of the growing American progressive movement, pursuing aggressive antitrust prosecutions of large corporations and signing a raft of progressive legislation during his second term in office, including the Pure Food and Drug Act, Hepburn Act, Federal Meat Inspection Act, Antiquities Act, and Federal Employers' Liability Act during his second term in office. In the 1908 presidential election, Roosevelt declined to run for a third consecutive term and supported his Secretary of War, William Howard Taft, who won the 1908 presidential election. Although Taft entered office determined to advance Roosevelt's domestic agenda, he stumbled badly and angered progressives during the debate over the Payne–Aldrich Tariff Act and the Pinchot–Ballinger controversy. The fallout from these events weakened Taft, alienated Roosevelt and his supporters, and divided the Republican Party between progressives and conservatives. In 1911, Roosevelt was also outraged when Taft used the Sherman Antitrust Act to block U.S. Steel from acquiring Tennessee Coal, Iron and Railroad Company, a merger Roosevelt had explicitly approved while in office.

In Taft's home state of Ohio, a group of Ohio Republicans, including James Rudolph Garfield, endorsed Roosevelt for the party's nomination for president in November 1911. Roosevelt conspicuously declined to make a Shermanesque statement flatly refusing their nomination. Soon thereafter, Roosevelt said, "I am really sorry for Taft... I am sure he means well, but he means well feebly, and he does not know how! He is utterly unfit for leadership and this is a time when we need leadership." In January 1912, Roosevelt declared "if the people make a draft on me, I shall not decline to serve". Later that year, Roosevelt spoke before the Ohio constitutional convention, openly identifying as a progressive and endorsing progressive reforms, including popular review of state judicial decisions. In reaction to Roosevelt's proposal, Taft said, "Such extremists are not progressives—they are political emotionalists or neurotics."

In 1912, Wisconsin senator Robert M. La Follette, a leader among progressive Republicans, announced that he would challenge to Taft for the party's presidential nomination. However, La Follette's campaign got off to a poor start, and many of his supporters switched to Roosevelt after his Ohio constitutional convention speech. Taft and Roosevelt engaged in a see-saw campaign for convention delegates throughout the spring and summer of 1912, with states holding direct primaries for delegates generally favoring Roosevelt, while states which elected their delegates via the traditional caucus and convention method favored Taft. One major showdown came in the Ohio primary on May 21. Both campaigns worked furiously, as did La Follette. Roosevelt's travelled 1,800 miles by train through the state, where he made 75 speeches, and Taft covered 3,000 miles and made over 100 speeches. Roosevelt swept the state, convincing Roosevelt that he should intensify his campaigning.

At the 1912 Republican National Convention, Roosevelt and Taft challenged the credentials of many of the delegates elected by state party conventions; Roosevelt in particular argued that Taft delegates had been elected through corruption or the use of rotten boroughs. The convention's credentials committee ruled in favor of Taft in nearly every case, effectively awarding him the party's nomination. At the convention itself on June 18–22, Roosevelt supporters abstained from balloting or walked out of the convention hall, and Taft was nominated.

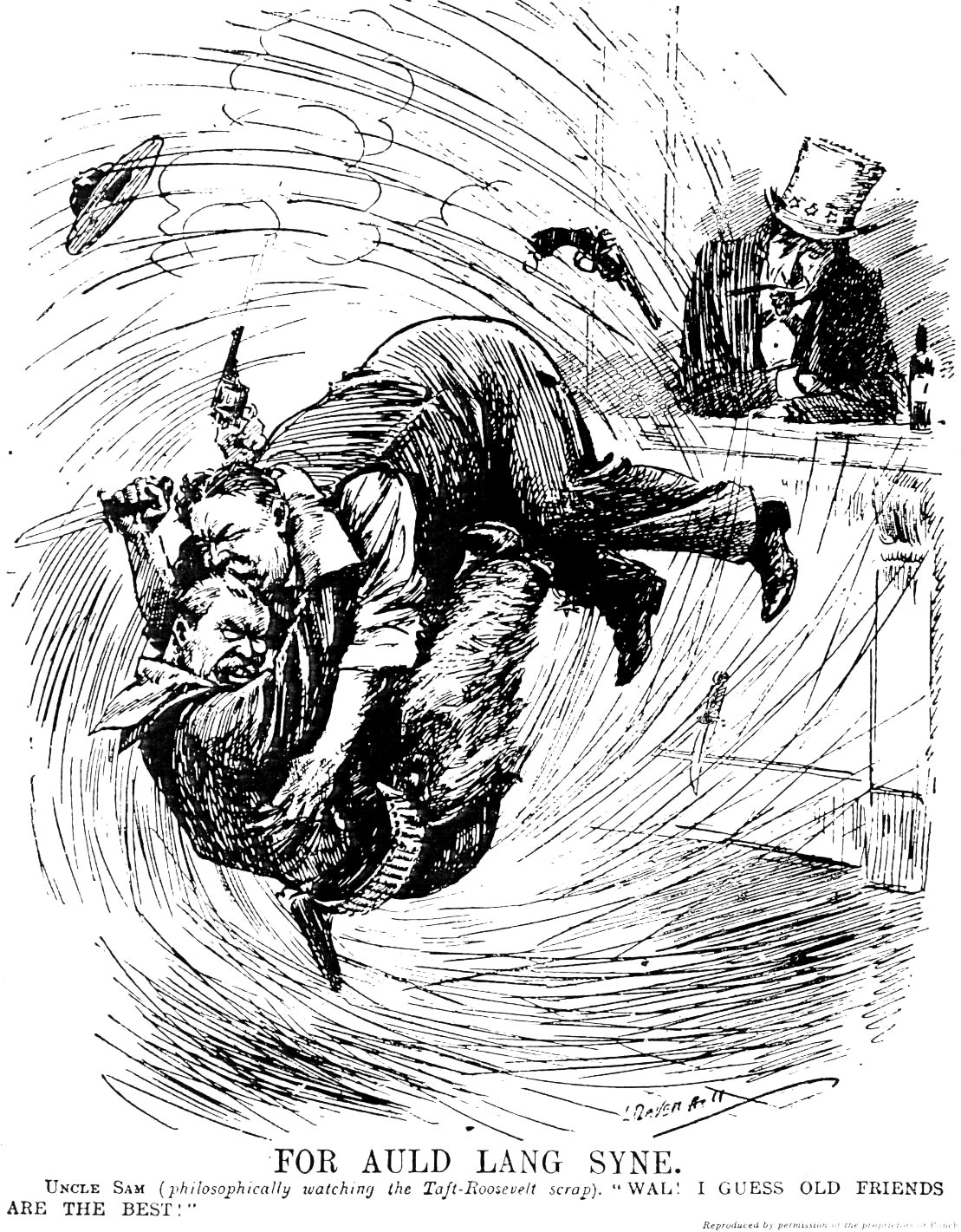
Punch in May 1912 depicts a no-holds-barred fight between Taft and Roosevelt.

=== Formation ===
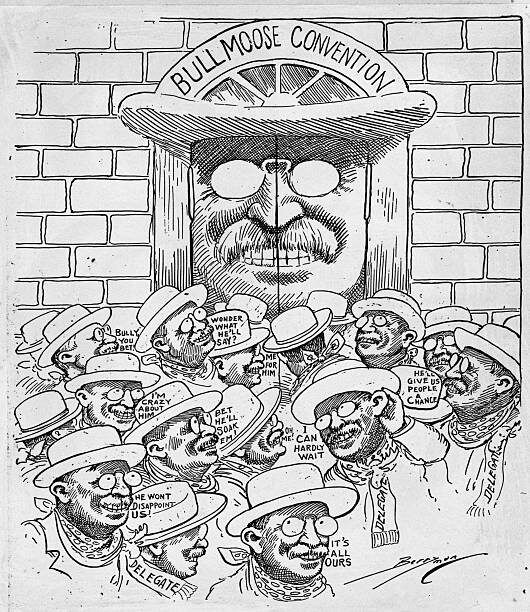
Editorial cartoon portraying delegates to the Bull Moose convention in 1912 as identical copies of Roosevelt

One day after the Republican convention, Roosevelt, publishing magnate Frank Munsey, financier George Walbridge Perkins and others established the Progressive Party. The new party was chaired by California governor Hiram Johnson, and its inaugural national convention was scheduled for August. The party raised initial funds totaling $600,000 (approximately $14,465,000 in 2025 dollars), far less than the major parties. The largest donors were Munsey ($135,000), Perkins ($130,000), and the Roosevelt family ($77,500). Perkins, who was a senior partner in the banking empire of J. P. Morgan & Co. and leading advocate of the efficiency movement, took charge of organization, though he was deeply distrusted by many party activists for his ties to banking. He was aided by Montana senator Joseph M. Dixon. Munsey and Frank Knox represented the newspaper and magazine publishing industry, which had popularized progressive crusades through investigative journalism and was angered by Taft's high tariff on print paper imports. Other founding party leaders included social reformer Jane Addams, former U.S. senator Albert J. Beveridge, Gifford Pinchot, and Amos Pinchot.

The new party had serious structural defects. Since it insisted on running a complete ticket in most states, politicians would have to abandon their current party entirely to support Roosevelt. Very few Democratic politicians ever joined the new party, while many Republican legislators, governors, committeemen, publishers, and editors were reluctant to bolt the old party, believing that it risked career suicide. As a result, many of Roosevelt's political allies remained Republicans and supported Taft, including his son-in-law, Nicholas Longworth. One exception to this rule was California, where Johnson controlled the Republican Party and excluded Taft from the state ballot. Nationally, only five U.S. senators joined the new party, despite early indications that as many as 15 supported Roosevelt. Membership was filled out by many independent or non-partisan reformers who found a new political home in the party.

Apart from California, the party was particularly strong in the industrial northeastern states of New York, Ohio, Indiana, Illinois, and Massachusetts, where the party base was composed of the growing urban and suburban white-collar middle class, including the managers of large corporations.

==== Exclusion of black-and-tan Republicans ====
African Americans were notably excluded from the new party. As president, Roosevelt had a mixed record on race relations during a period of intense segregation and discrimination, especially in the southern United States. He had taken a significant political risk in 1901 by hosting Booker T. Washington for dinner at the White House, which had drawn intense backlash from white racists, but he had alienated many black supporters through his uncompromisingly stern approach to the 1906 Brownsville affair, in which he had ordered the dishonorable discharge of an entire regiment of Buffalo soldiers. By 1912, Roosevelt had a sharply negative opinion of the multi-racial faction of the southern Republican Party, which he regarded as corrupt and ineffective. During the Republican delegate fight in the South, black Republicans had strongly supported Taft, while Roosevelt had been supported by the segregated white faction of the party. Ultimately, Roosevelt alienated white Southerners by again publicly dining with black people at an integrated Rhode Island hotel on the eve of the election.

=== Convention and platform ===
Despite these obstacles, the August convention opened with great enthusiasm. Over 2,000 delegates attended, including many women, as the party endorsed national women's suffrage, in contrast to both the Democrats and Republicans. The notable suffragist and social worker Jane Addams gave a seconding speech for Roosevelt's nomination. Roosevelt was nominated by acclamation, with Johnson as his running mate. The main work of the convention was the platform, which set forth the new party's appeal to the voters. It included a broad range of social and political reforms long advocated by progressives. It spoke with near-religious fervor and the candidate himself promised: "Our cause is based on the eternal principle of righteousness; and even though we, who now lead may for the time fail, in the end the cause itself shall triumph".

==== Platform ====
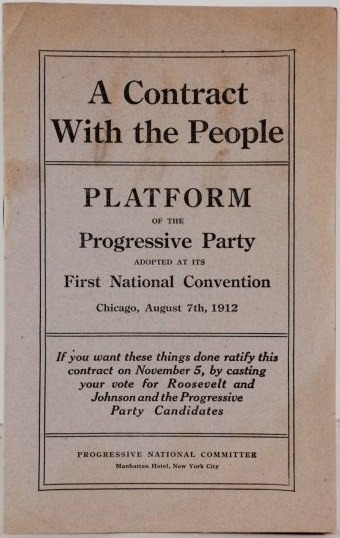
16-page campaign booklet with the platform of the new Progressive Party

The platform's main theme was Roosevelt's call for a "New Nationalism," reversing the domination of politics by business interests, which allegedly controlled the Republican and Democratic parties alike, through a strong executive branch and direct democracy. Roosevelt's policy was explicitly paternalistic, in direct contrast to Wilson's individualistic platform calling for "The New Freedom". The platform asserted:

To destroy this invisible Government, to dissolve the unholy alliance between corrupt business and corrupt politics is the first task of the statesmanship of the day.

To that end, the platform called for:

- strict limitations and disclosure requirements on political campaign contributions;
- registration of lobbyists;
- recording and publication of congressional committee proceedings;
- a national health service to include all existing government medical agencies;
- social insurance, to provide for the elderly, the unemployed, and the disabled;
- limitations on the ability of judges to order injunctions against labor strikes;
- a minimum wage law for women;
- an eight-hour workday;
- a federal securities commission;
- farm relief;
- a national health service;
- reductions in tariff rates;
- limitations on naval armaments by international agreement;
- workers' compensation for occupational injuries;
- an inheritance tax;
- women's suffrage;
- direct election of United States senators;
- direct primary elections for state and federal party nominations;
- reducing the threshold for amendments to the United States Constitution;
- recall elections for judicial, executive, and legislative officers;
- direct referenda on legislation and judicial decisions; and
- popular initiative for the proposal of new legislation by petition.

The biggest controversy at the convention was over the platform section dealing with trusts and monopolies. While the convention had approved a strong "trust-busting" plank, Perkins replaced it with language that spoke only of "strong national regulation" and "permanent active [federal] supervision" of major corporations. The reversal shocked the reformist element; Pinchot blamed it on Perkins. The result was a deep split in the new party that was ultimately never resolved.

Roosevelt also favored a vigorous foreign policy, including strong military power. Though the platform called for limiting naval armaments, it also recommended the construction of two new battleships per year, much to the distress of outright pacifists such as Jane Addams.

=== 1912 campaign ===
Roosevelt ran a vigorous campaign for the presidency, but he was handicapped by opposition or neutrality from the business interests which had backed him in 1904, the split in the Republican vote, and norms against electing any president to a third term.

On October 14, while campaigning in Milwaukee, Roosevelt was shot by John Schrank but survived the bullet and finished his speech with blood seeping into his shirt. As an experienced hunter and anatomist, Roosevelt correctly concluded that since he was not coughing blood, the bullet had not reached his lung. He opened his speech by remarking, "Ladies and gentlemen, I don't know whether you fully understand that I have just been shot, but it takes more than that to kill a bull moose." After his speech, probes and an x-ray showed that the bullet had lodged in his chest muscle and did not penetrate the pleura. Doctors concluded that it would be less dangerous to leave it in place, and Roosevelt carried the bullet with him for the rest of his life. Both Taft and Wilson suspended their campaigns until Roosevelt recovered. When asked if the shooting would affect his campaign, he told a reporter, "I'm fit as a bull moose." He spent two weeks recuperating before returning to the campaign trail.

Ultimately, the party drew very few votes from the Democratic Party, and the Republican split was politically fatal, allowing Woodrow Wilson to win an electoral landslide with only a plurality of the popular vote. Roosevelt received 88 electoral votes, compared to 435 for Wilson and 8 for Taft. As of 2026, Roosevelt's remains the best showing by any third party since the American two-party system was established in 1864, and he is the only third-party candidate to outpoll one of the established parties.

In addition to Roosevelt's presidential campaign, hundreds of other candidates sought office as Progressives in 1912, including twenty-one candidates for governor and over 200 for United States House of Representatives. In many places, these candidates were cross-endorsed by the Republican Party through electoral fusion. Because the party had been organized during the ongoing campaign, some candidates also ran with ad hoc labels, such as "Bull Moose Republican," or in Pennsylvania, the "Washington Party." Progressives generally won between 10 and 30 percent of the vote in these races, winning nine seats in the U.S. House and approximately 250 local offices. However, they won no governorships, and the results throughout the country generally mirrored the presidential election; the Democratic Party benefitted from a split in the Republican vote, gaining many governorships, 63 House seats, and many state legislative seats, which gave them additional seats in the United States Senate.

=== Later years ===
==== 1914 ====
Despite Roosevelt's second-place finish, the Progressive Party began to fade immediately, and Republicans regained much of their strength, reinforcing the two-party system. In 1914, the party nominated 138 candidates for U.S. House, and five were elected. However, almost half of the party candidates failed to get more than 10 percent of the vote in their races. At the state level, the party retained some strength. Hiram Johnson remained a bright spot for the party; after he was denied renomination as a Republican, he was re-elected governor of California as a Progressive. In Pennsylvania, Gifford Pinchot ran for United States Senate and won 24 percent of the vote, finishing second. Other state parties remained fairly strong; in Washington state, Progressives won a third of the legislative seats.

==== 1916 ====
In early 1916, Louisiana businessman John M. Parker ran for governor as a Progressive, presenting an alternative to the one-party system of the American South. Parker got a respectable 37 percent of the vote. However, he was the only Progressive to run for governor.

In the summer, the party held its second national convention. In an effort to facilitate reconciliation with the Republicans and avoid a repeat of the 1912 election, both parties held their conventions in Chicago from July 7–10. Progressives favored a joint nomination for Roosevelt, while Republicans strictly opposed his nomination. As the joint committee met an impasse, the Republican convention began to swing toward Charles Evans Hughes, a moderate progressive who, as a justice of the United States Supreme Court, had been neutral during the 1912 election. When Progressives suggested a joint nomination of Hughes to Roosevelt, he responded by proposing the nomination of his friend, Henry Cabot Lodge. Shocked Progressives immediately nominated Roosevelt again with John Parker for vice president. Roosevelt refused the nomination and endorsed Hughes instead, who was immediately nominated by the Republicans.

As a result of Roosevelt's decision not to run and endorse Hughes, the national Progressive Party promptly disintegrated. Most Progressives followed Roosevelt back into the Republican Party, including Hiram Johnson, who was elected to the United States Senate. Some, such as Harold L. Ickes and Bainbridge Colby, instead supported Wilson for re-election. By 1918, every Progressive member of Congress had joined the Republican Party, except Whitmell P. Martin of Louisiana, who had joined his state's dominant Democratic Party. The party fielded no candidates for governor, Senate, or House in the 1918 elections, which resulted in a resounding victory for the reunited Republicans.

=== Aftermath and legacy ===
Although most Progressive Party members rejoined the Republican Party, they remained a minority faction within the conservative, pro-business party. No former Progressive was nominated on a national ticket until 1936, when Frank Knox was nominated for vice president. Many former Progressives, like Ickes, remained alienated from party politics until the 1932 election, when Roosevelt's distant cousin, Franklin D. Roosevelt, formed the New Deal coalition and the Democratic Party embraced many of Roosevelt's positions. In California, where the party had been strongest, the state party affiliate survived into the 1960s through a combination of electoral fusion and the popularity of Hiram Johnson.

Since 1920, at least three national third parties have embraced the Progressive label, though their platforms differed significantly from Theodore Roosevelt's:

- In the 1924 presidential election, Roosevelt's former ally and rival Robert M. La Follette embraced the label for his own presidential campaign. Unlike the 1912 party, which had relied on members of the urban, Eastern upper-middle class who favored industrial and social reform, the La Follette party was heavily agrarian, populist, and far more comfortable with immigration, anarchism, and socialism. It was supported by farmers, railroad workers, and labor unions, accepting many former supporters of Eugene V. Debs. La Follette won over 16 percent of the vote and finished second in many northern states, carrying his home state of Wisconsin. The party survived until 1927.
- In 1938, La Follette's son, Wisconsin governor Philip La Follette, attempted to create a national third party based on the success of his own Wisconsin Progressive Party, which he named the National Progressives of America (NPA). Although many progressives had joined the New Deal coalition by this time, La Follette criticized Franklin D. Roosevelt for aggrandizing executive power, expanding bureaucracy, and deficit spending while pursuing a limited platform of scarcity management rather than national production. La Follette was criticized for the party's aesthetic similarities to European fascism and lost re-election as governor in 1938. Following his defeat, efforts at a national movement quickly collapsed.
- In the 1948 presidential election, former vice president Henry A. Wallace ran for president on a Progressive Party ticket, representing a fissure in the New Deal coalition between its Cold War hawks and doves. Wallace opposed the growing anti-communist and anti-Soviet attitudes of the Cold War, as represented in the Truman doctrine. During the campaign, Wallace accepted the endorsement of the Communist Party USA and refused to purge communists from his campaign staff. On domestic issues, Wallace embraced comprehensive civil rights and racial equality. Wallace finished a distant fourth, winning under 3 percent of the national vote, though he performed strongly in New York City. The party survived until 1955.

Several state parties (excluding state affiliates of the above-named national parties) have also adopted the Progressive label since 1920, including:

- Oregon Progressive Party (2009–present)
- Minnesota Progressive Party (1988)
- Vermont Progressive Party (1999–present)

In addition, the Cool Moose Party in Rhode Island was founded in 1994 to support the local political campaigns of Robert J. Healey; its name is a reference to the Bull Moose Party. His platform has been described as populist and libertarian.

== Electoral history ==
United States House of Representatives
Election year	No. of overall seats won	+/–	Presidency
1912	9 / 435	▲9	Woodrow Wilson
1914	6 / 435	▼3	Woodrow Wilson
1916	3 / 435	▼3	Woodrow Wilson
1918	0 / 435	▼3	Woodrow Wilson

United States Senate
Election year	No. of overall seats won	+/–	Presidency
1912/1913	0 / 96	0	Woodrow Wilson
1914/1915	1 / 96	▲1	Woodrow Wilson
1916	0 / 96	▼1	Woodrow Wilson

=== Presidential elections ===
Election	Candidate	Running mate	Votes	Vote %	Electoral votes	+/-	Outcome of election
1912	Theodore Roosevelt	Hiram Johnson	4,122,721	27.4	88 / 531	▲88	Democratic victory
1916	Theodore Roosevelt (refused nomination)	John M. Parker	33,406	0.2	0 / 531	▼88	Democratic victory

=== Office holders from the Progressive Party ===
Position	Name	State	Dates held office
Representative	James W. Bryan	Washington	1913–1915
Governor	Joseph M. Carey	Wyoming	1911–1912 as a Democrat, 1912–1915 as a Progressive
Representative	Walter M. Chandler	New York	1913–1919
Representative	Ira Clifton Copley	Illinois	1915–1917 as a Progressive
State Representative	Bert F. Crapser	Michigan	1913–1914
Representative	John Elston	California	1915–1917 as a Progressive, 1917–1921 as a Republican
Lieutenant Governor	John Morton Eshleman	California	1915–1917
Representative	Jacob Falconer	Washington	1913–1915
Representative	William H. Hinebaugh	Illinois	1913–1915
Representative	Willis J. Hulings	Pennsylvania	1913–1915
Governor	Hiram Johnson	California	1911–1915 as a Republican, 1915–1917 as a Progressive
Representative	Melville Clyde Kelly	Pennsylvania	1917–1919 as a Progressive, 1919–1935 as a Republican
Representative	William MacDonald	Michigan	1913–1915
Representative	Whitmell Martin	Louisiana	1915–1919 as a Progressive, 1919–1929 as a Democrat
Senator	Miles Poindexter	Washington	1913–1915
Representative	William Stephens	California	1913–1917
Representative	Henry Wilson Temple	Pennsylvania	1913–1915
Representative	Roy Woodruff	Michigan	1913–1915
State Treasurer	Homer D. Call	New York	1914
Mayor	Louis Will	Syracuse, New York	1914–1916

== See also ==
- California Progressive Party, a state affiliate
- Committee of 48
- Lincoln–Roosevelt League, the California Progressive Party in the early 1900s
- Progressive Party (United States, 1924–1927)
- Progressive Party (United States, 1948–1955)
- Vermont Progressive Party
- Wisconsin Progressive Party
