= Fairmont Coke Works =

Former Superfund site in West Virginia

Coordinates: 39.4959°N 80.1202°W

The Fairmont Coke Works was a Sharon Steel Corporation-operated works site in Fairmont, West Virginia, dubbed the Sharon Steel / Fairmont Coke works site. It was later classified as a Superfund site. After decades of remediation, plots of the land have been redeveloped.

== History ==
=== Period of operation ===
It was built in 1918 by the Standard Oil Co. of New Jersey, and in 1948, purchased by Sharon Steel Corporation.

Pollution at the site was reported to impact nearby residents, as well as workers. On a routine patrol of the adjacent river, the Monongahela, an inspector for the state water resources department reported "bubbling action" 20 feet from the shore line, and discovered a pipe leading directly to the Sharon coke ovens at the site. Another was found in a cave, in what the inspector called "willful pollution." In a 1979 state air pollution inspection, coke ovens were in some cases collapsing, allowing gas to escape. Sharon Steel shut the coke works on May 31, 1979, firing 200 people.

=== Superfund classification and remediation ===
Sharon had been facing $300 million in federal fines for pollution, although, in 1982, the EPA agreed to drop the fines if Sharon handled the hazardous waste cleanup itself. While the EPA ordered Sharon to handle the waste, Fairmont officials began work on an ordinance to limit Sharon's ability to receive a burial permit.

In June 1983, Fairmont officials passed an ordinance targeted at Sharon, which banned the permanent disposal of hazardous waste in the city limits. The 1983 ordinance took precedence over EPA regulations and state officials, and forbid Sharon from burying the site's waste, including heavy metals, phenols, cyanide, coal tars, and sulphuric acids. Sharon contested the law to higher courts, arguing it preempted state and federal regulations. In 1985, a judge gave the company an order to control its pollution in Fairmont.

It was placed on the Superfund list by the EPA in 1996.

=== Redevelopment plans ===
In 2006, a water park was being built on part of the property.

In 2016, the EPA was in talks over addressing contaminated land at the works site. ExxonMobil was involved in the redevelopment. In 2018, a portion of the redeveloped site was being used as the West Virginia State Trooper 1 Headquarters.

In 2021, after remediation, the City of Fairmont requested development proposals for a 67-acre track of land. It had been vacant for decades, and once mostly an empty field. Other chunks of land were still being cleaned.

In 2022, the Fairmont City Council was considering developing the land.

== See also ==
- List of Superfund sites in West Virginia
