= Trans-World Group =

Company

TransWorld Group was an association of commodities traders controlling stakes in most of Russia's aluminum smelters. It was established by David and Simon Reuben.

By 1996 TransWorld was the world's third-largest aluminum producer, behind Alcoa and Alcan. In 1997 it controlled smelters across the former Soviet Union with revenues estimated in at $5-7 billion. TransWorld was accused of involvement in illegal activities, including several murders.

== History ==
The aluminum sector was one of the most contested industries during the Russian privatization process. David Reuben had been buying aluminum from the Soviet state since the late 1970s. In the post-Soviet turmoil, Reuben that found he could get the finished metal at low Soviet-era prices and then sell it at market rates. To set up the scheme, he established a partnership with Lev and Michael Cherney. Lev Chernoy's top aide was Vladimir Lisin, who, during the Soviet era, had been second-in-command to Oleg Soskovets when he was a steel-works executive.

Oleg Soskovets, now Deputy Prime Minister, helped the firm in getting official approval for a tolling agreement. Under the system, both the raw material and the finished product were the property of TransWorld. The scheme maximized the cost of plant inputs and minimized the selling price for the metals. Trans World concluded its first tolling agreement in 1992, with the BrAZ smelter in Bratsk.

By 1994, Trans-World was selling more than 600,000 tons of aluminum a year, or a quarter of Russia's total exports. As more of Russia's industry was privatized, Trans World bought stakes in the country's largest smelters, to prevent the rise of competitors which also might be interested in signing tolling deals.

When the Krasnoyarsk Aluminum Factory, Russia's second-largest, refused to enter an agreement with Trans-World, the director of the plant began to receive threats. Vadim Yafyasov, a deputy director, was killed in front of his Moscow home on 10 April 1995. Felix Lvov, a Trans-World rival, was picked up by men with special services IDs as he was sitting in a plane at Sheremetyevo Airport. His corpse was found in a nearby wood several days later. Trans-World eventually took control of the Krasnoyarsk smelter in cooperation with Anatoly Bykov, described by the New York Times as "one of Russia's most infamous mobsters".

Oleg Soskovets was dismissed from his government post in 1996, after falling out of favor with Yeltsin.

A series of investigative reports broadcast by the NTV television network in 1996 accused TransWorld Group of working with the Izmailovsky gang of the Russian mafia, and of having committed a series of high-profile murders: in particular, those of Felix Lvov, Oleg Kantor and Vadim Yafyasov.

In 1997 the company was investigated by the Russian police and the National Criminal Intelligence Service of Britain, but no charges were brought. By late 1997 Trans-World Group was being squeezed out by Russia-based financial groups, and had lost control of parts of its holdings, including Novolipetsk Steel.

In early 2000, Trans-World sold most of its aluminum holdings to Roman Abramovich, who merged them with Oleg Deripaska's company to create Russian Aluminum (today Rusal).

In June 2000, an investigation into Trans-World's business was published in Fortune magazine; the article remarked that the company's history was filled with "more than a few corpses". The Reubens brothers subsequently sued Richard Behar, the article's writer, for libel in a London court. The magazine issued a clarification to the story in 2004, where they specified that "Fortune did not claim and does not claim that the Reubens were responsible for any murders".

Fortune's findings were mirrored in the pages of the Financial Times, which in a 2000 article similarly noted that struggles over the control of the Krasnoyarsk smelter had resulted in dozens of murders. While noticing that the victims included both allies and competitors of Trans-World, the story stressed that David Reuben "angrily denies any hint that they or their partners had any role in the violence".
