= Altai-Koks =

Russian coke producer

- Company type: Open Joint Stock Company
- Founded: 1981
- Headquarters: Zarinsk, Russia
- Revenue: 132,000,000 United States dollar (1994)
- Parent: NLMK
- Website: altai.nlmk.com

Open Joint-Stock Company Altai-Koks (Russian: Открытое акционерное общество «Алтай-кокс», romanized: Otkrytoe aktsionernoe obshchestvo "Altay-koks") is one of the largest Russian producers of coke and by-products. It produces coke and a wide range of chemical products. The company has a 13% share of overall Russian coke production.

== Geography & History ==
The production site of OJSC Altai-Koks is located in Zarinsk, Altai Krai. The project to build the Altai coke and by-product plant was approved in 1971. In 1981, the first batch of coke was produced by coke battery No.1. Altai-Koks was incorporated as an Open Joint-Stock Company in 1993. In 2006 the Company became a part of Novolipetsk Steel.

== Products ==
The Company processes coal extracted from the Kuznetsk Basin and has capacities to produce coke qualities for different applications and several kinds of chemical products. The main kinds of products are blast-furnace coke, foundry coke, coke nut and coke breeze. Chemicals production share in overall 2005 production results of the company was 8%. OJSC Altai-Koks supplies ammonium sulfate, coal-tar pitch, anthracene, naphthalene, absorbing and phenol fraction as well as crude benzole.

== Production ==
In 2006 the fifth coke battery with annual coke production capacity of 1.14 million tonnes was commissioned. The new coke battery includes more powerful ovens producing coke of the highest quality. Upon commissioning of the fifth coke battery, the aggregate annual output reaches as much as 5 million tonnes of coke.

== Owners and membership ==
CEO - Valyas Vadim Ivanovich.

Founder - Novolipetsk Metallurgical Plant.

== Corporate responsibility ==
OJSC Altai-Koks is a town-forming company and one of the largest employers and taxpayers in the Altai region. The company employs approximately 5,500 people.
