= Stoilensky GOK =

- Company type: Public
- Industry: Mining
- Headquarters: Stary Oskol
- Products: Iron ore Iron ore concentrate Sintering ore
- Revenue: 131,800,000 United States dollar (1994)
- Website: http://www.sgok.ru/

OJSC Stoilensky GOK is an iron ore company in Russia. Its main facility, the Stoilensky Mining and Beneficiation Plant (SGОК), is located in Stary Oskol, in the Belgorod region. Stoilensky is associated with Novolipetsk Steel and accounts for roughly 16% of Russia's iron ore production.

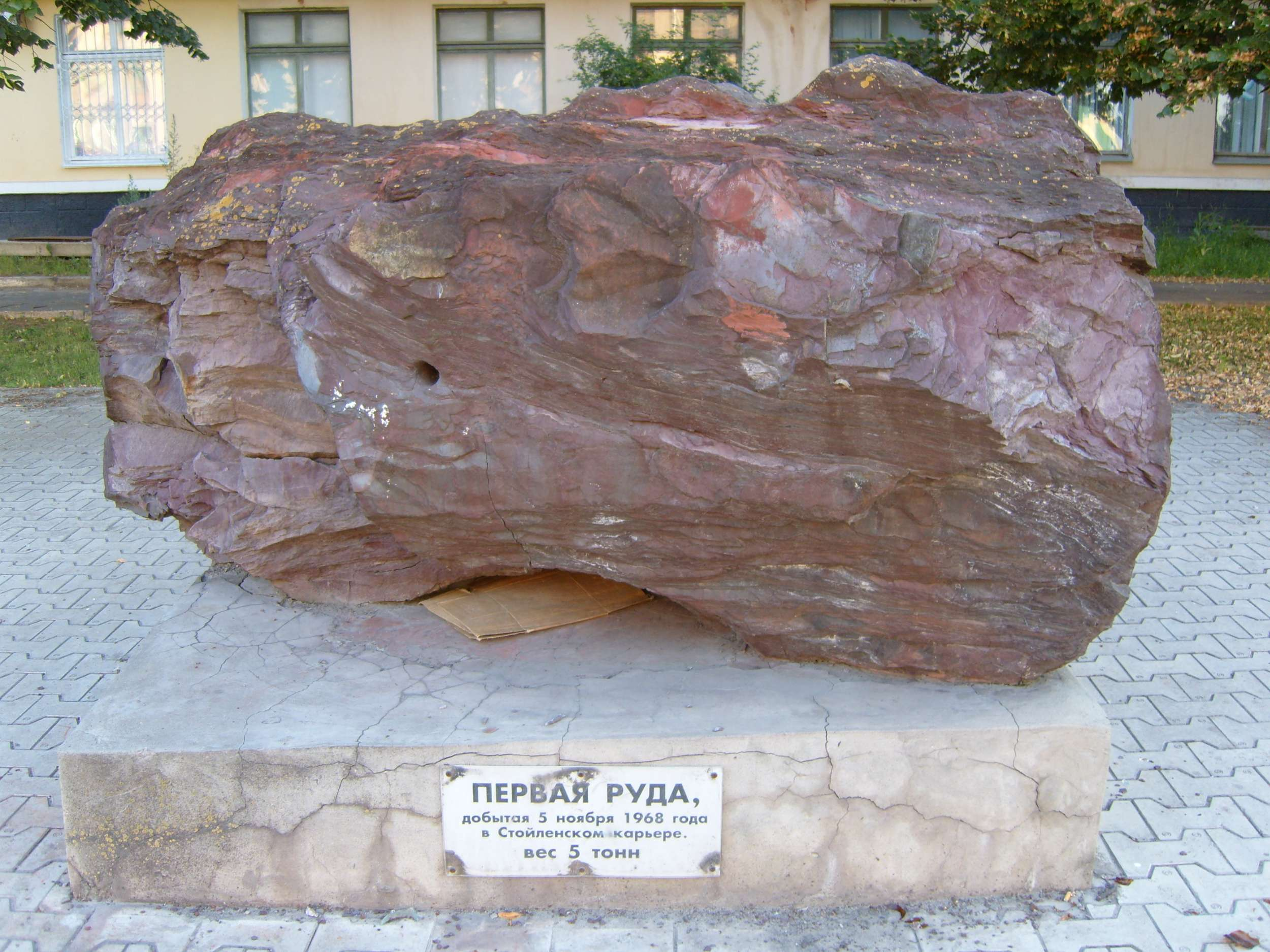

Stoilensky GOK is listed in the MICEX and RTS exchanges in Russia.

== Operations ==
The Stoilensk deposit is in the northeastern part of the Kursk Magnetic Anomaly. The company's mine is confirmed to have reserves of 26.6 million tons of high-grade iron ore and 1.4 billion tons of ferruginous quartzite.
