= VIZ-Stal =

VIZ-Stal is a producer of cold-rolled electrical steels and the largest producer of grain-oriented electrical steel in Russia. Its share of global grain-oriented electrical steel production is almost 11 per cent. Over 80 per cent of its products are exported.

== Geography and history ==
VIZ-Stal was established based on the production facilities of OJSC Verkh-Isetsk plant. The facilities are located in the city of Ekaterinburg (Urals Region), close to main transportation routes to Europe and South-East Asia as well as to ports with all-year-round navigation of the western and eastern coasts of Russia. In 2006, the company became a part of NLMK Group.

== Products ==
Production facilities have an annual capacity to produce about 200,000 tonnes of electrical steel. In 2006, the company produced 180,000 tonnes of grain-oriented steel and 16,000 tonnes of non-grain-oriented steel.

Novolipetsk Steel (NLMK) is the major supplier of hot-rolled coils for further cold rolling at VIZ-Stal. The main customers of electrical steels are Russian companies in the electrical and electronic industry, manufacturers of household electrical and radio appliances, as well as electrical companies abroad.

== Employment ==
At present the company employs nearly 2,300 people.
