= Novolipetsk Metallurgical Plant =

Russian metallurgical company

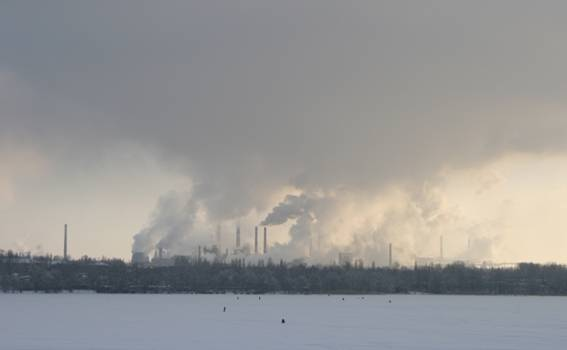
- Industry: Ferrous metallurgy
- Founded: 1934; 92 years ago
- Headquarters: Lipetsk, Russia
- Revenue: 2,986,600,000,000 Russian ruble (1994)
- Parent: Novolipetsk Steel

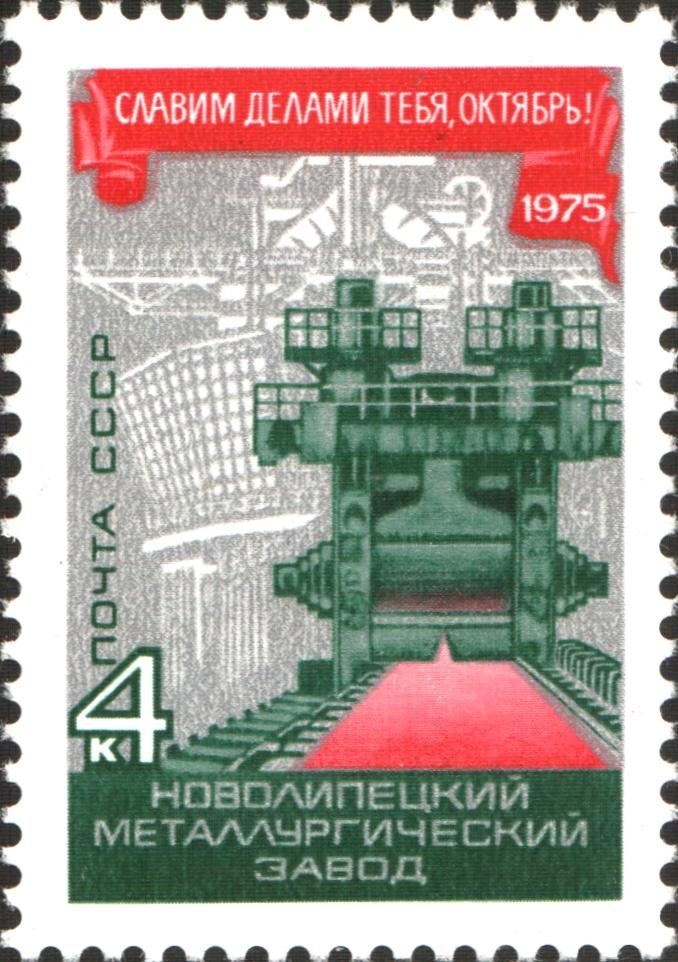
Postage stamp of the USSR, 1975

The Novolipetsk Metallurgical Plant, also known as NLMK, (Russian: Новолипецкий металлургический комбинат) is a Soviet and Russian metallurgical plant located in the Left Bank district of Lipetsk. The largest steel plant in Russia and the 17th in the world in terms of production in 2018. Full name - public joint stock company "Novolipetsk Metallurgical Plant". The Kursk Magnetic Anomaly, the main supplier of raw materials for the enterprise, is located 350 km away. Part of the Novolipetsk Steel.

The Novolipetsk Metallurgical Plant was hit by Ukrainian drones on the 24th of February. The strike caused major damage to the plant.

The specificity of the enterprise is associated with an increased burden on the environment. According to the results of an audit initiated in 2006 by the Accounts Chamber, it followed that “NLMK OJSC accounted for 88% of the volume of pollutant emissions in the Lipetsk Region”. From 2007 to 2012, the plant implemented a number of investment projects for environmental protection, including in the areas of "Water" and "Air". In 2009, the plant completely stopped the discharge of industrial wastewater into the Voronezh River. All these actions led to the fact that, according to representatives of the ecology of the plant, the environmental situation in Lipetsk has improved remarkably. However, despite this, emissions of harmful substances and controversial environmental situations и спорные экологические ситуации are regularly observed at the plant. In 2019, the European Court of Human Rights communicated the complaint of 22 residents of Lipetsk, demanding that the Russian government take care of the environmental situation in the city (the complaint was filed in 2009). In 2020, the volume of harmful emissions of the enterprise amounted to 270 thousand tons and became the leader, along with the enterprises of Cherepovets, in terms of carbon monoxide emissions. As of 2021, Lipetsk is still among the ten cities in Russia with the worst air pollution.

On the night of 28 June 2024, according to Russian media, seven Ukrainian drones struck the Novolipetsk Metallurgical Plant. No casualties were reported however the oxygen station and oxygen separation unit were damaged.

== Owner ==
Lisin Vladimir Sergeevich is the main owner and owns 79.3% of NLMK shares through the Cyprus holding Fletcher Group. The remaining shares are in free circulation.

== See also ==
- Serafim Kolpakov
