= Antonio Gozzi =

Italian entrepreneur (born 1954)

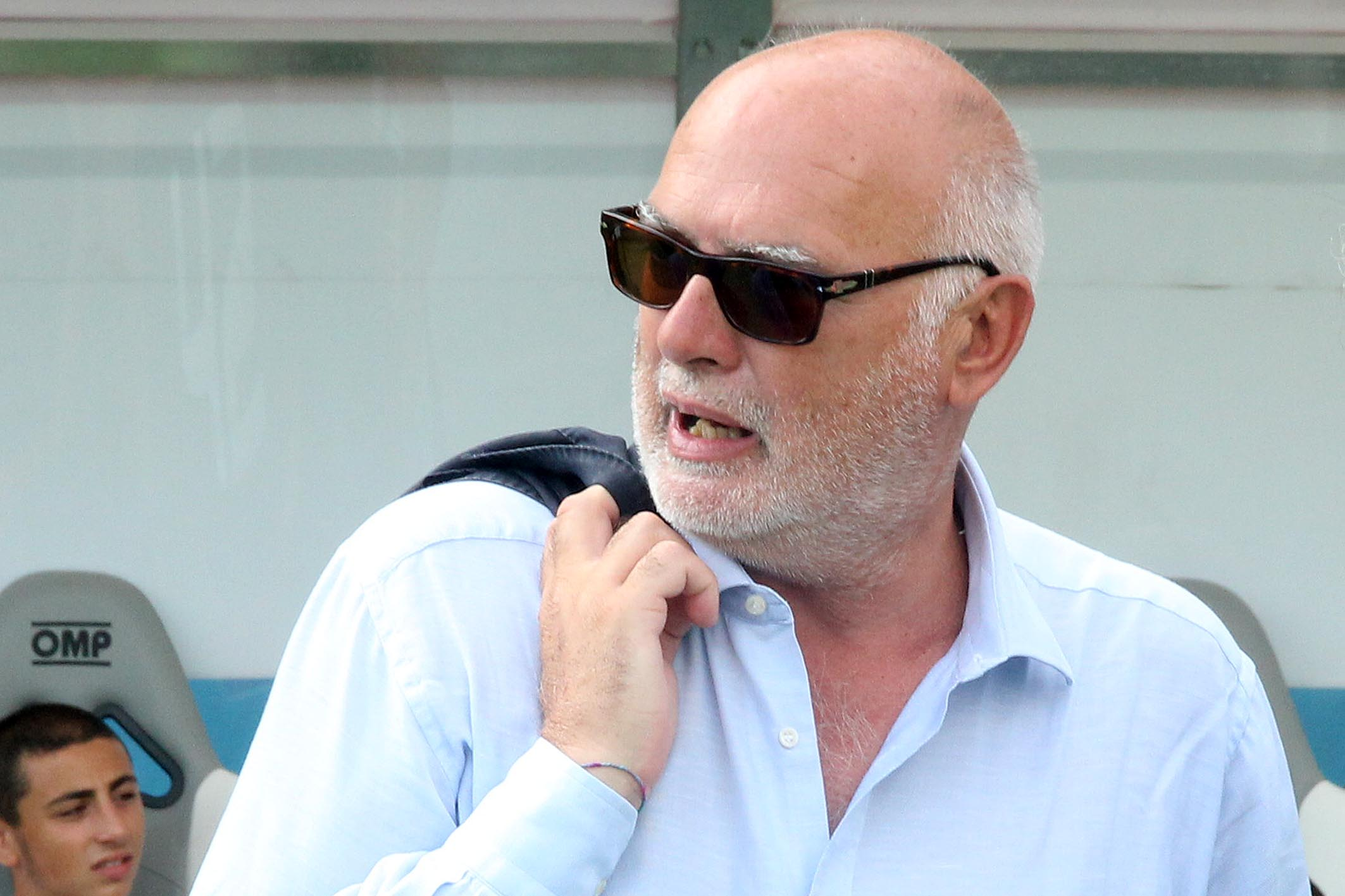
- Born: April 15, 1954 (age 71)
- Citizenship: Italian
- Occupation(s): CEO of Duferco, Chairman of Virtus Entella

Antonio Gozzi is the CEO of Duferco. He is also the current chairman of the Italian soccer team Virtus Entella.

== Arrest ==
He was arrested on 17 March 2015 for suspicion bribery business in Congo. He was later released; he said that he would resign from Italian Federacciai association in order to follow the ethical conduct of Federacciai association, but it was reconfirmed a few days later by the association.
