= OJSC Dolomite =

- Native name: ОАО Доломит
- Industry: Metallurgy
- Headquarters: Russia
- Products: Metallurgical dolomite
- Parent: NLMK Group
- Website: dolomit.su

OJSC Dolomite (Russian: ОАО Доломит) forms part of the Russia metallurgical complex, being the only producer of metallurgical dolomite in the Central Black Earth economic region. The company mines 55% of the total amount of dolomite produced in Russia and 43% in CIS. It is part of the NLMK Group.

The company has explored the Dankov dolomite field (Lipetsk Oblast) since 1932. The product mix includes fluxed and converter dolomite, dolomite flour, crushed rock for construction and road works. The facility is located near to developed transport infrastructure, which is strategically advantageous for its customers.

In 2005 the Company production reached 1.9 mln. tonnes. Dolomite is mainly sold in the domestic market. The main customers are steelmaking companies; their share is 69% of the total sales volume. NLMK's share in the company's sales structure amounted to 51% in 2005.
