= North-Western Shipping Company =

Russian ship-owning company

- Company type: Open Joint Stock Company
- Industry: Transportation
- Founded: 1923
- Headquarters: Saint Petersburg, Russia
- Revenue: ▲US$ 160.2 mln (2023)
- Operating income: ▲US$ 1.7 mln (2011)
- Number of employees: 2,200 (2011)
- Website: nwsc.spb.ru

The North-Western Shipping Company (Russian: Северо-Западное пароходство, romanized: Severo-Zapadnoye parokhodstvo) is a Russian ship-owning company within UCL Holding and is ultimately controlled by Vladimir Lisin's Fletcher Group Holdings Ltd. Founded in 1923 as the North-Western River Shipping Company, the company now owns a fleet of 107 vessels, totaling 400,000 DWT (Dead Weight Tons).

== Business Description ==
The North-Western Shipping Company serves an important role of delivering dry, general, and oversize cargoes from Europe and elsewhere to the Russian hinterland cost-effectively.

The North-Western Shipping Company's fleet of vessels includes dry cargo ships, bulk carriers between 1,500 and 7,000 DWT capable of navigating both rivers and seas.
