= Henry A. Roemer =

American businessman (1884–1969)

Henry A. Roemer (September 27, 1884, in Ohio – November 13, 1969) was an American business executive who served as president of the Sharon Steel Corporation from 1931 to 1957

In 1931, when Roemer became president, Sharon Steel was losing $500,000 that year on $10 million sales. When he retired in 1957, the company was producing $150 million in revenue and $4 million in earnings per year. Sharon Steel Corporation had become one of the best-known steel companies in the American Midwest. According to one source, Roemer was one as the greatest business leaders of the twentieth century.

In 1987, Sharon Steel filed for Chapter 11 bankruptcy.
