= List of Superfund sites in West Virginia =

This is a list of Superfund sites in West Virginia designated under the Comprehensive Environmental Response, Compensation, and Liability Act (CERCLA) environmental law. The CERCLA federal law of 1980 authorized the United States Environmental Protection Agency (EPA) to create a list of polluted locations requiring a long-term response to clean up hazardous material contamination. These locations are known as Superfund sites, and are placed on the National Priorities List (NPL).

The NPL guides the Environmental Protection Agency in "determining which sites warrant further investigation" for environmental remediation. As of October 4, 2022, there were 11 Superfund sites on the National Priorities List in West Virginia. No additional sites are currently proposed for entry on the list. Three sites have been cleaned up and removed from the list.

== Superfund sites ==
Deleted from National Priorities List

Name	Town	County	EPA ID	Proposed	Listed	Construction completed	Partially deleted	Deleted	Map	Coordinates	Citation
Allegany Ballistics Laboratory (USNAVY)	Mineral County	Mineral	WV0170023691	06/23/1993	05/31/1994	N/A	N/A	N/A	Link	39.561111,-78.834722	
Big John Salvage - Hoult Road	Fairmont	Marion	WVD054827944	02/04/2000	07/27/2000	N/A	N/A	N/A		39.512965, -80.112990	
Fike Chemical, Inc.	Nitro	Kanawha and Putnam	WVD047989207	12/30/1982	09/08/1983	N/A	N/A	N/A	Link	38.426775, -81.847219	
Follansbee Site	Follansbee	Brooke	WVD004336749	12/30/1982	09/08/1983	07/25/2003	N/A	01/16/2004	Link	39.862396, -80.788477	
Hanlin-Allied-Olin	Moundsville	Marshall	WVD024185373	10/02/1995	07/22/1999	N/A	N/A	N/A	Link	39.862396, -80.788477	
Leetown Pesticide		Jefferson	WVD980693402	12/30/1982	09/08/1983	04/07/1992	N/A	08/29/1996			
North 25th Street Glass and Zinc	Clarksburg	Harrison	WVN000306876	04/07/2016	09/09/2016	N/A	N/A	N/A		39.297053,-80.357433	
Ordnance Works Disposal Areas	Morgantown	Monongalia	WVD000850404	10/15/1984	06/10/1986	09/08/2003	N/A	08/21/2018	Link	39.620818, -79.974330	
Paden City Groundwater	Paden City	Wetzel	WVN000304985	09/09/2021	03/16/2022	N/A	N/A	N/A		39.606140, -80.930248	
Ravenswood PCE Ground Water Plume	Ravenswood	Jackson	WVSFN0305428	03/08/2004	09/23/2004	N/A	N/A	N/A	Link	38.948143, -81.762190	
Shaffer Equipment/Arbuckle Creek Area	Minden	Fayette	WVD988768909	09/18/2018	05/15/2019	N/A	N/A	N/A			
Sharon Steel Corp (Fairmont Coke Works)	Fairmont	Marion	WVD000800441	06/17/1996	12/23/1996	N/A	N/A	N/A	Link	39.492983, -80.113934	
Vienna Tetrachloroethene	Vienna	Wood	WVD988798401	04/23/1999	10/22/1999	08/23/2005	N/A	N/A	Link	39.325867, -81.549139	
West Virginia Ordnance (USARMY)	Point Pleasant	Mason	WVD980713036	12/30/1982	09/08/1983	N/A	12/13/2002; 04/26/2004	N/A	Link	38.881665, -82.122441	

== See also ==
- List of Superfund sites in the United States
- List of environmental issues
- List of waste types
- TOXMAP
