= Novolipetsk Steel =

Steel company

OJSC Novolipetsk Steel

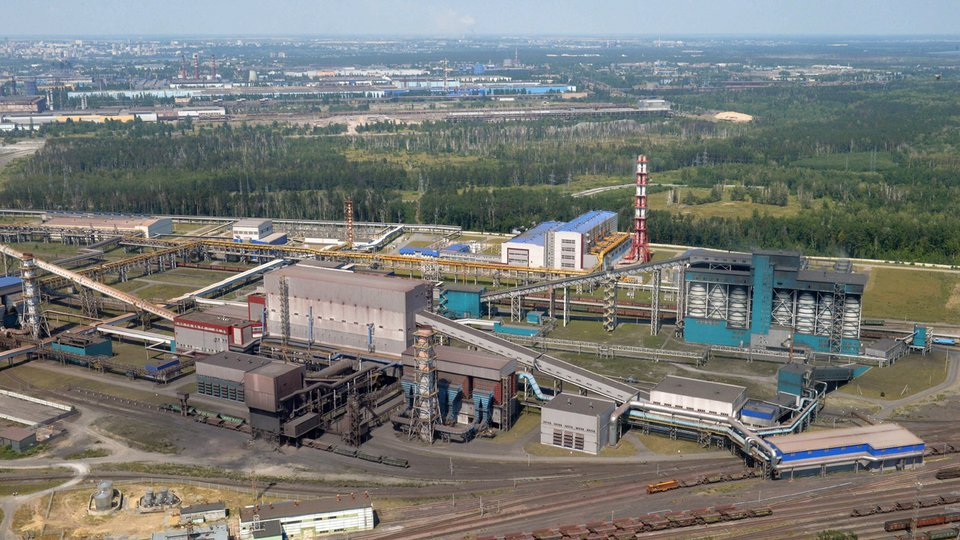
- Novolipetsk Steel plant
- Native name: OAO Новолипецкий металлургический комбинат
- Company type: Public (OAO)
- Traded as: MCX: NLMK; LSE: NLMK
- Industry: Steel
- Founded: 1931; 95 years ago
- Headquarters: Lipetsk, Russia
- Key people: Vladimir Lisin (Chairman); Sergey Karataev (President, Chairman of the Management Board)
- Products: Steel; Steel products
- Revenue: ₽831 billion (2025)
- Operating income: ₽75.4 billion (2025)
- Net income: ₽63.1 billion (2025)
- Total assets: $12.2 billion (2021)
- Total equity: ₽884 billion (2025)
- Number of employees: 60,200 (2013)
- Website: http://nlmk.com/en/

Novolipetsk Steel, or NLMK, is one of the four largest steel companies in Russia. NLMK's share of domestic crude steel production is about 21%. It primarily produces flat steel products, semi-finished steel products, and electrical steels. NLMK also produces specialty coated steels, as well as high-ductility and micro-alloyed steels. It is the 21st-largest steel maker in the world. The larger NLMK group owns several other steel and mining companies, primarily in Russia.

== History ==
Historically, the Lipetsk area in central Russia has had substantial iron ore deposits. In 1702, Peter the Great ordered the construction of an iron foundry there.

In 1931, Novolipetsk Iron and Steel began construction of a plant on the site of the iron ore mine. Prospering down through the decades, Novolipetsk became a joint-stock company in 1992 and then in 1993 began the process of privatization by distributing company shares to its employees. The company seems to be acquisitive; see the list of related organizations. In 1998, Vladimir Lisin became the chairman. The manufacturing area in Lipetsk covers 27 square kilometers.

Less than half of NLMK's steel output is sold in Russia.

The company's primary source of iron ore is now Stoilensky GOK, a company located 350 km from the mills at Lipetsk.

== Business ==
=== Acquisitions ===
The largest of NLMK's acquisitions was a 50% stake in a joint venture with the Duferco Group in December 2006. The venture includes one steel plant and five rolling mills in Western Europe and the United States. The joint venture also includes service and distribution facilities located in Europe. In 2021, the company's revenue amounted to 793 billion rubles.

Other acquisitions include:

- OJSC Dolomite, miner and processor of metallurgical dolomite, acquired in 1997
- OJSC Stagdok, miner and processor of fluxing limestone, acquired in 1999
- OJSC Stoilensky GOK, iron ore supplier, acquired in 2004 (97%)
- OJSC TMTP, operator of the Black Sea port of Tuapse, acquired in 2004 (controlling interest)
- License for the large coking coal deposit Zhernovskoie 1 in the Kuzbass region of Russia, acquired at State auction in 2005
- DanSteel A/S, Danish steel rolling company, acquired in 2006
- OJSC Altai-koks, acquired in 2006
- VIZ-Stal, the second-largest Russian electrical steel producer, acquired in 2006
- Sharon Coatings, becoming NLMK Pennsylvania

== Ecology ==
Since 2007, NLMK has implemented some investment projects on environmental protection. In 2009, it stopped discharges of industrial wastewater into the river Voronezh. As a result of all the activities, the water consumption of the NLMK Group decreased from 120.4 million cubic meters per year in 2008 to 77.2 million cubic meters per year in 2012, and emissions into the atmosphere decreased by 40%.

NLMK reported Total CO2e emissions (Direct + Indirect) for the twelve months ending 31 December 2020 at 33,587 kilotonnes(+1,365/+4.2% y-o-y).

NLMK's annual Total CO2e emissions (Direct + Indirect) (in kilotonnes)
Dec 2015	Dec 2016	Dec 2017	Dec 2018	Dec 2019	Dec 2020
32,800	34,166	34,765	35,264	32,222	33,587

== See also ==
- List of steel producers
