= Mergers and acquisitions in the United States steel industry =

Mergers and acquisitions in the U.S. steel industry involve either the combining of two steel companies into one (a merger) or the purchase of another steel company’s assets, shares, or equity (an acquisition). These M&A transactions are done for many reasons including attempts to grow, expand markets, and gain a competitive advantage in the industry. The steel industry is known for cyclical demand, price fluctuations, and high capital investment requirements.

Since the late 19th century, the U.S. steel industry has experienced multiple periods of consolidation. These include the creation of U.S. Steel in 1901, the growth of minimill producers such as Nucor in the late 20th century, and more recent mergers involving companies like Cleveland-Cliffs. Consolidation has generally been driven by efforts to improve supply chains, lower costs, and respond to economic and global competition, rather than for speculative investment.

Due to steel’s role in infrastructure, manufacturing, and national defense, mergers and acquisitions in the industry have drawn attention from policymakers and antitrust regulators. Key developments have included the emergence of major firms such as Bethlehem Steel and, more recently, Cleveland-Cliffs’ acquisitions of AK Steel and ArcelorMittal USA.

In the 21st century, foreign investment and international market trends have added complexity to mergers and acquisitions. A notable example is the purchase of U.S. Steel by Japan’s Nippon Steel. Domestic companies, including Cleveland-Cliffs, continue to seek expansion, contributing to a highly consolidated industry structure. As of 2025, the U.S. steel industry is shaped by ongoing trade disputes, technological developments, and increased consolidation. Future mergers are expected to reflect both strategic goals and regulatory and geopolitical considerations.

== Overview ==
Unlike some industries where M&A activity is driven by speculative investors, the steel sector typically sees consolidation led by companies with specific strategic objectives. Mergers and acquisitions can work to improve supply chains, expand operations, and lessen exposure to market volatility. In the United States, M&A transactions are regulated under antitrust laws, including the Clayton Act, which prohibits mergers that may significantly reduce competition or lead to monopolization.

=== Economic importance of steel in the United States ===
Steel is a key component of the U.S. economy, supporting employment, infrastructure, manufacturing, trade, and national security. The industry provides jobs across various sectors, from steel mills to automotive, construction, and manufacturing.

As a vital material for infrastructure, steel is used in bridges, highways, railways, buildings, and pipelines. Advanced steel products, such as corrosion-resistant and high-strength materials, improve durability and reduce maintenance costs. Its widespread use in critical structures makes it essential to economic stability and daily life.

Steel is also crucial to U.S. manufacturing, strengthening industrial production and competitiveness. Additionally, it plays a strategic role in national security by supplying materials for military vehicles, naval ships, aircraft, and weapons systems. Due to its importance, the government closely monitors foreign investments and mergers in the industry, as seen in recent policy decisions.

=== Overview of consolidation tends in the American steel industry ===
The U.S. steel industry has seen significant consolidation in recent decades, with M&A activity accelerating since 2020. In 2021, record profits and increased investment fueled much of this activity, which cut down the number of major American-owned steelmakers to three: Nucor, Cleveland-Cliffs, and Steel Dynamics.

Key transactions include Cleveland-Cliffs’ 2020 acquisition of ArcelorMittal USA, which added 20.3 million tons of annual steel production capacity. U.S. Steel expanded through its full acquisition of Big River Steel in 2021 for $1.474 billion, after purchasing a 49.9% stake in 2019. These deals reflect industry efforts to integrate operations, strengthen supply chains, and adapt to market shifts.

== History ==
=== Historical background (pre-1920s) ===
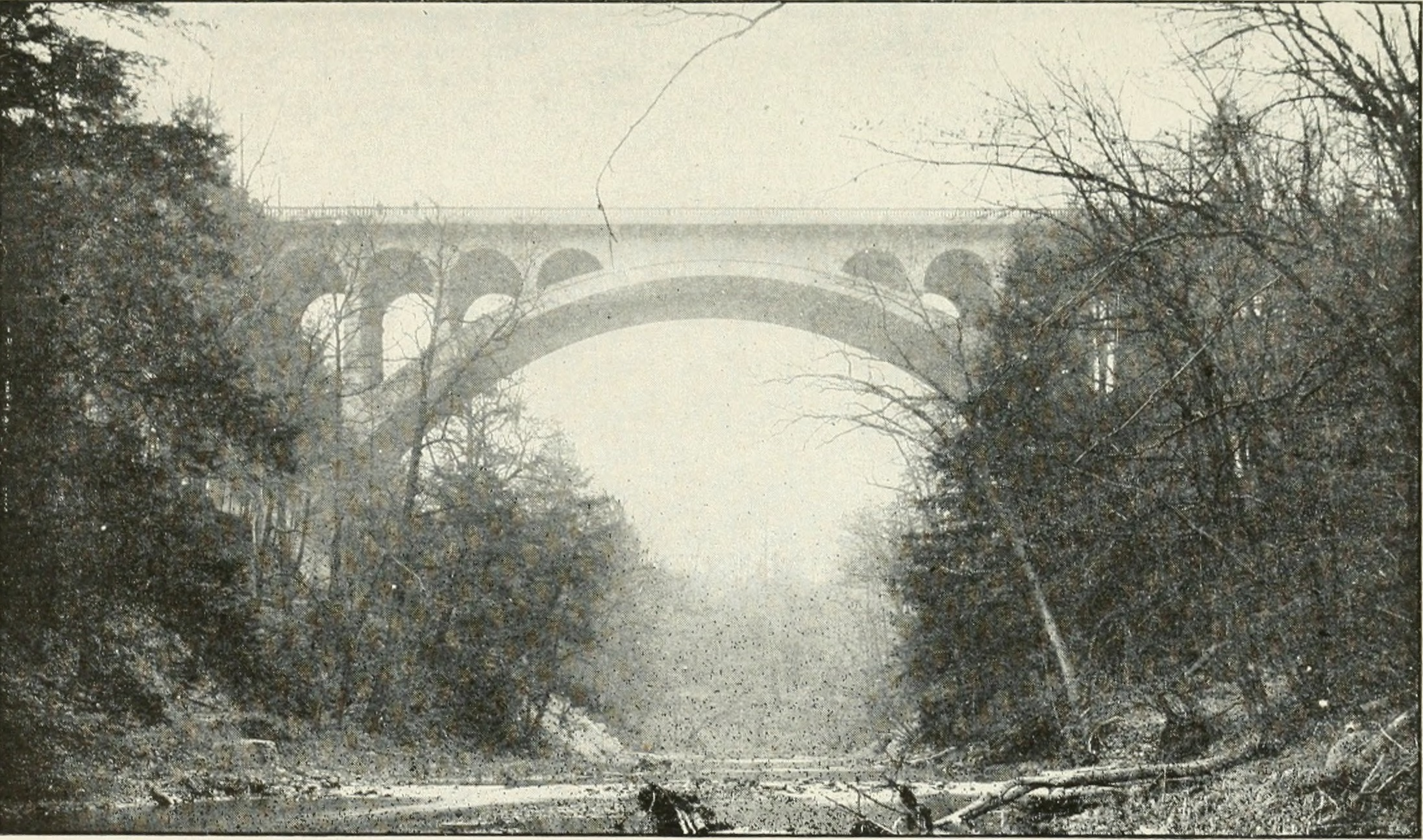
A concrete bridge built in 1909. Steel bridges gained popularity and became a common sight during the late 19th and early 20th centuries.

The late 19th and early 20th centuries saw major technological advancements and consolidation in the U.S. steel industry, culminating in the creation of the world’s largest corporation at the time. This period set the stage for future mergers and government regulation of corporate consolidation.

Before the 1850s, steel production was expensive and relied on charcoal and small-scale operations. The industry changed with the 1856 introduction of the Bessemer process, which allowed mass production by removing impurities from molten pig iron. This innovation reduced steel costs by over 50% and cut production time from a full day to 10–20 minutes. The first U.S. steel mill using this process was built in Troy, New York, in 1865, followed by Andrew Carnegie’s Edgar Thomson Steel Works in Pittsburgh in 1875. Carnegie’s adoption of this technology dramatically lowered the price of steel rails, from $100 per ton in 1873 to $18 per ton by the 1890s.

By 1910, U.S. steel production had grown from 1.25 million to 24 million tons, making it the world’s largest steel producer. Other advancements, such as Paul Héroult’s electric arc furnace, improved efficiency by reaching higher temperatures and enabling better recycling of scrap steel.

The industry’s growth influenced the location of steel mills. Early iron smelting was concentrated in Pennsylvania, New York, and New Jersey, near iron ore deposits. As steel production shifted to coal-based fuel, mills moved closer to coal supplies, with Pittsburgh becoming a key hub due to its coal deposits and rivers. The discovery of rich iron ore deposits near Lake Superior further shaped the industry, leading to the establishment of steel mills in cities like Chicago, Detroit, Gary, Cleveland, and Buffalo to process ore transported via the Great Lakes.

==== Creation of U.S. Steel in 1901 ====
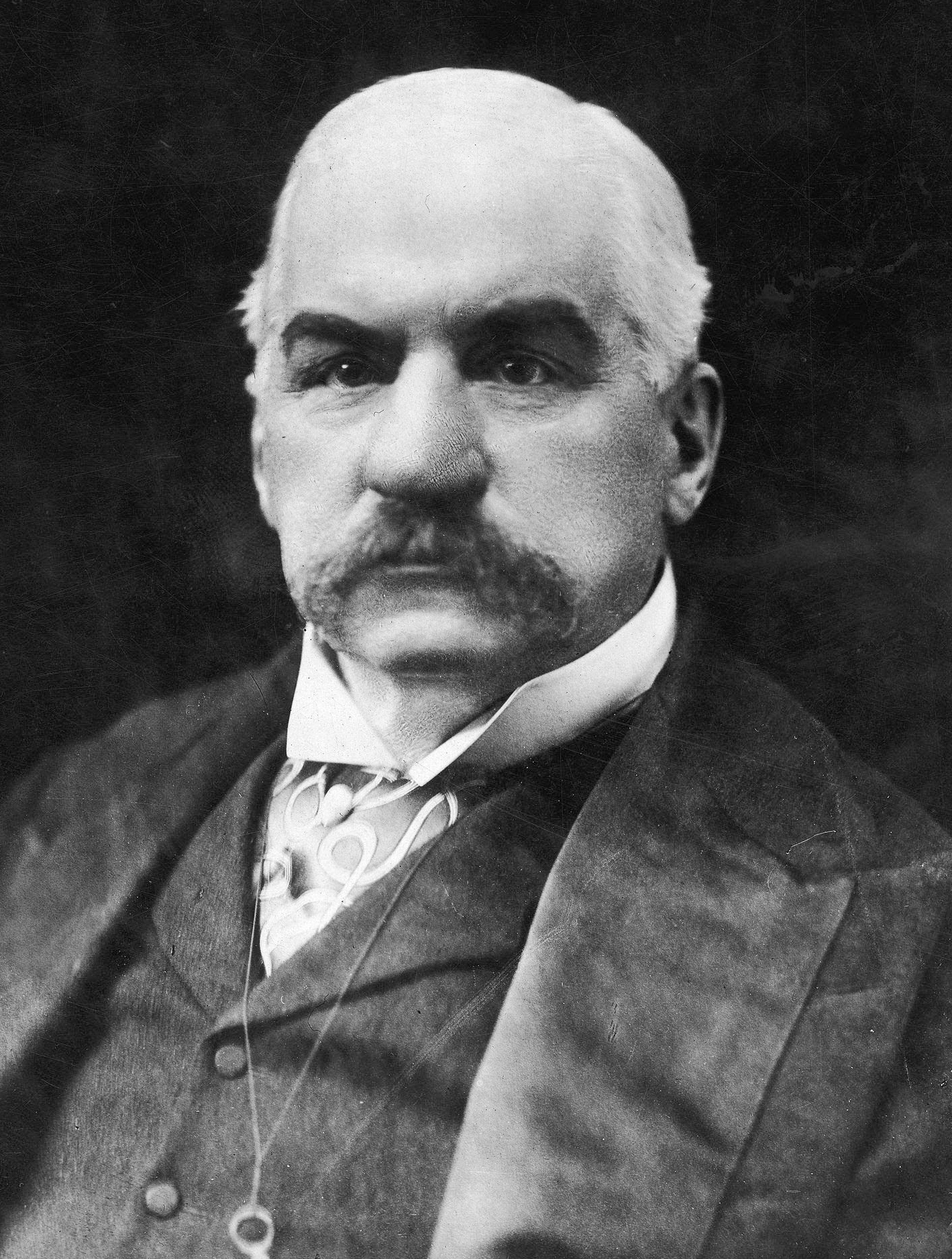
American banker J.P. Morgan, founder of U.S. Steel.

On March 2, 1901, financier J.P. Morgan established the United States Steel Corporation by merging several major steel companies. This consolidation brought together Andrew Carnegie’s Carnegie Steel Company, Elbert H. Gary’s Federal Steel Company, and William Henry Moore’s National Steel Company, along with National Tube Works, American Steel & Wire, American Sheet Steel, American Steel Hoop, American Tin Plate, American Bridge, and the Lake Superior Consolidated Iron Mines.

Elbert H. Gary became chairman, and Charles M. Schwab, who proposed the merger, served as president. The company’s formation marked the peak of a major merger wave and solidified Morgan’s economic influence. With a $1.4 billion capitalization, U.S. Steel became the world’s first billion-dollar corporation, surpassing the national debt and federal budget. The Wall Street Journal noted public concerns over its immense scale. The company controlled 60% of U.S. steel production, manufacturing 67% of the nation’s steel output in its first year. U.S. Steel’s dominance extended from raw materials to finished products. It played a crucial role in U.S. industrial growth, supplying steel for major infrastructure and construction projects.

==== Early monopolistic practices and antitrust concerns ====
The steel industry’s rapid consolidation occurred alongside growing federal antitrust efforts. The Sherman Antitrust Act, passed on July 2, 1890, aimed to curb monopolistic practices by prohibiting contracts or conspiracies that restrained trade.

Despite its dominance, U.S. Steel’s market share declined from 67% in 1901 to 50% by 1911, facing competition from Bethlehem Steel, led by former U.S. Steel president Charles M. Schwab. In 1907, President Theodore Roosevelt approved U.S. Steel’s acquisition of Tennessee Coal, Iron and Railroad Company, avoiding an antitrust suit. However, in 1911, Attorney General George Wickersham filed a lawsuit accusing U.S. Steel of monopolization and price fixing.

On June 3, 1915, a federal court dismissed the case, ruling that U.S. Steel did not monopolize the industry, as competition remained strong. The Supreme Court upheld this decision in 1920, finding no intent to restrain trade. The ruling shaped future antitrust enforcement, establishing that corporate size alone was not illegal under the Sherman Act without evidence of harmful practices.

=== The interwar period (1920s-1940s) ===
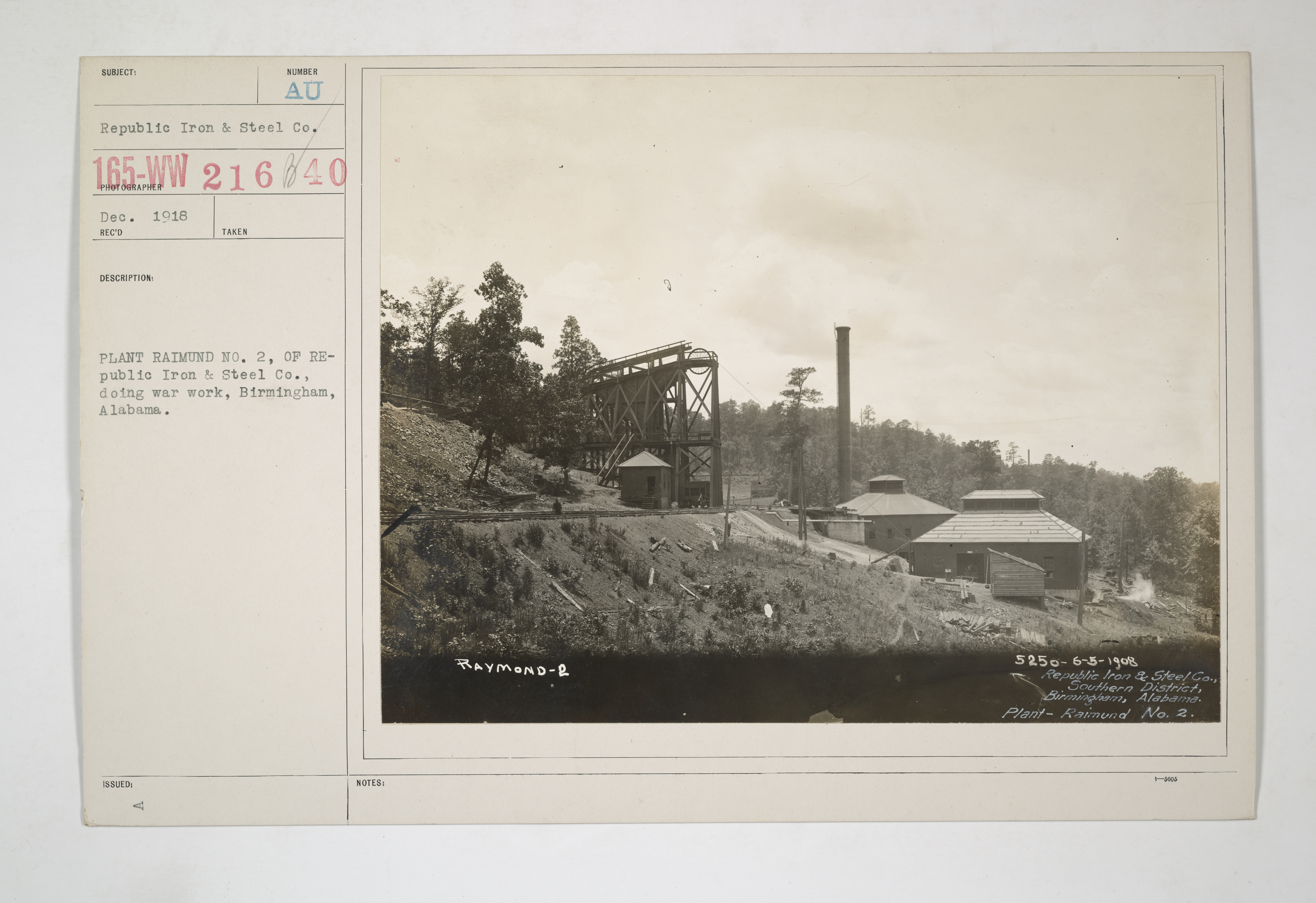
A steel plant during World War II. Republic Steel Company in Birmingham, Alabama.

The interwar period brought major changes to the American steel industry, with the Great Depression accelerating consolidation and reshaping competition. Economic turmoil forced mergers and corporate restructuring as companies struggled to survive.

Before the Depression, the industry had already begun consolidating, though a few dominant players remained. U.S. Steel, created in 1901 through J.P. Morgan’s merger of Carnegie Steel, Federal Steel, and National Tube, was the industry leader, capitalized at $1.4 billion (about $52.9 billion today). It controlled roughly two-thirds of American steel production in its early years.

By the 1920s, U.S. Steel’s dominance declined as competitors emerged. Bethlehem Steel, led by Charles M. Schwab and Eugene Grace, became the second-largest U.S. steelmaker, focusing on government contracts, ships, and skyscraper construction. Unlike the more conservative U.S. Steel under Judge Elbert Gary, Bethlehem was aggressive and adaptive.

The 1929 Wall Street Crash triggered a severe economic downturn that devastated the steel industry. The Great Depression wiped out equity values, collapsed commodity prices, and sharply reduced trade. Steel, which had thrived in the 1920s amid rapid urbanization, saw demand evaporate. By 1931, mills like U.S. Steel’s Duquesne Works had depleted their order backlogs, and new business for construction steel nearly disappeared. By 1934, less than a quarter of Duquesne’s open hearths were active, while the Edgar Thomson Works in Braddock shut down for nearly two years.

National steel production bottomed out in 1933, reaching its lowest level of the Depression. The industry’s capital-intensive nature and high fixed costs made it especially vulnerable to economic downturns, forcing many companies to close or consolidate to survive.

=== Post-war expansion (1950s–1960s) ===
The 1950s and 1960s saw attempts at consolidation in the U.S. steel industry, though large-scale mergers faced regulatory opposition. A notable example was the proposed 1957 merger between Bethlehem Steel, the second-largest steel producer (15.4% market share), and Youngstown Sheet & Tube, ranked fifth (4.7%). The merger aimed to challenge U.S. Steel’s dominance (holding approximately 25% market share), but it was blocked in 1958 under the Clayton Act, reflecting growing antitrust concerns in the industry.

Instead of mergers, U.S. Steel focused on internal restructuring. In 1953, it merged four major subsidiaries to streamline operations and enhance efficiency. It also expanded its facilities, including opening the Fairless Works in Pennsylvania in 1952, to strengthen its market presence.

While large mergers were limited, companies pursued diversification and strategic acquisitions. U.S. Steel expanded into non-steel industries, establishing the Pittsburgh Chemical Company in 1964 in response to concerns about slowing steel demand. Bethlehem Steel, meanwhile, increased its steel exports in the 1950s, averaging 23 million tons annually to aid post-war reconstruction, though this reliance on exports made it vulnerable to global market fluctuations.

Despite growing international competition, U.S. steelmakers were slow to adopt new technologies such as electric arc furnaces (EAFs) and continuous casting, preferring to maintain traditional integrated mills. In contrast, European and Japanese firms invested in modernization, improving efficiency and competitiveness.

=== Steel industry crisis (1970s–1980s) ===
The U.S. steel industry faced a major crisis in the 1970s and 1980s, leading to mergers, bankruptcies, and widespread mill closures.

The largest steel merger of the 1980s occurred in 1984 when LTV Corporation merged with Republic Steel, forming LTV Steel, the second-largest U.S. steel company after U.S. Steel. The merger, initially challenged on antitrust grounds, was approved after Republic agreed to divest certain assets. Despite their size, both companies faced significant financial struggles.

Not all merger attempts succeeded. The federal government blocked a proposed U.S. Steel-National Steel merger in 1984, though U.S. Steel later acquired National Steel’s assets in 2003 after its bankruptcy.

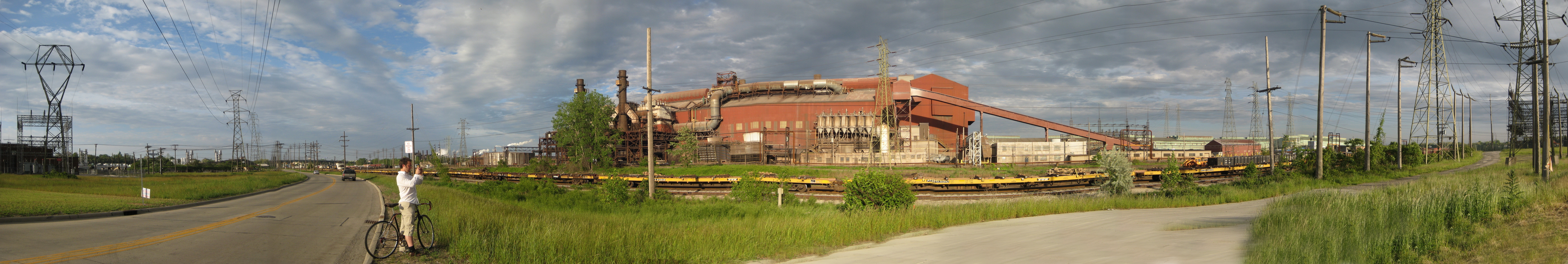
The ArcelorMittal steel mill in Cleveland, Ohio, in 2008. Cleveland struggled to recover from the collapse of its steel industry in the 1980s.

Cleveland’s steel industry collapsed, with U.S. Steel shutting down all its remaining mills by 1984. The Monongahela Valley suffered severe job losses, with U.S. Steel cutting its workforce from 26,500 in 1979 to 4,000 by 1989. One of the most notable closures was Homestead Steel Works, shut down in 1986 after over a century of production.

The closures devastated steel communities, causing population declines and economic distress. Pittsburgh’s unemployment rate peaked at 17.1% in 1983, reaching 27.1% in some areas, and the region lost 30% of its population between 1970 and 1990.

The Reagan administration introduced voluntary restraint agreements (VRAs) in the 1980s to limit steel imports, with the expectation that U.S. companies would reinvest in modernization and worker retraining.

=== The Minimills Revolution (1980s-1990s) ===
The rise of minimills significantly changed the U.S. steel industry, shifting its structure, technology, and competition. Minimills, led by companies like Nucor, contributed to the decline of traditional integrated steelmakers, prompting widespread restructuring and consolidation.

Minimills use electric arc furnaces (EAFs) to melt scrap steel, unlike traditional mills that rely on blast furnaces and iron ore. This approach required less capital, operated more flexibly, and had lower labor costs. Initially, minimills produced basic long products such as bars and wire. By 1990, they held 86% of the wire rod market and 65% of merchant bars, with full dominance in wire rods projected by 2000. However, scrap feedstock limited their ability to make higher-grade flat products used in cars and appliances.

Nucor began as part of ventures by auto pioneer Ransom Eli Olds and became the Nuclear Corporation of America in 1955. In financial trouble by the mid-1960s, it shifted focus to its Vulcraft steel joist division under new leadership. High steel costs led to the construction of its first EAF mill in Darlington, South Carolina, in 1969, and the company became Nucor Corporation in 1972.

Despite early technical issues, Nucor’s profits surged in the early 1970s. It expanded product lines through the decade and, by 1980, ranked among the top 20 U.S. steelmakers, with $430 million in sales and $42 million in net earnings. In 1986, Nucor entered the flat-rolled steel market—an area previously controlled by integrated producers. With $755 million in annual revenue, the company invested over $250 million in thin-slab casting technology.

In 1989, it opened a mill in Crawfordsville, Indiana, using compact strip production developed with SMS Schloemann-Siemag. This process enabled thinner, more efficient sheet steel production, overcoming a long-standing technical challenge. By 1993, Nucor opened a second thin-slab mill in Hickman, Arkansas, establishing its leadership in flat-rolled steel.

=== Consolidation era (1990s–2010s) ===
From the 1990s through the 2010s, the American steel industry underwent significant restructuring marked by bankruptcies, mergers, and growing foreign ownership. These changes reshaped domestic steel production and had lasting effects on industrial communities.

Economic pressures intensified in the late 1990s and early 2000s, leading to widespread financial distress. Approximately 40 steel companies filed for bankruptcy during this time, contributing to the closure of over 60,000 businesses and the loss of around 5.4 million jobs across the sector.

This environment created opportunities for consolidation. In 2002, financier Wilbur Ross formed the International Steel Group (ISG) by acquiring the assets of the bankrupt LTV Corporation. ISG expanded by purchasing additional distressed assets, including Bethlehem Steel in 2003 for approximately $1.5 billion. These acquisitions made ISG the largest steel producer in North America at the time.

In 2005, ISG was acquired by Mittal Steel, an international firm led by Lakshmi Mittal. Following regulatory and shareholder approval, the merger created the world’s largest steel company, with operations in 14 countries and a workforce of about 165,000 people. This marked a major shift in the ownership of former American steel firms.

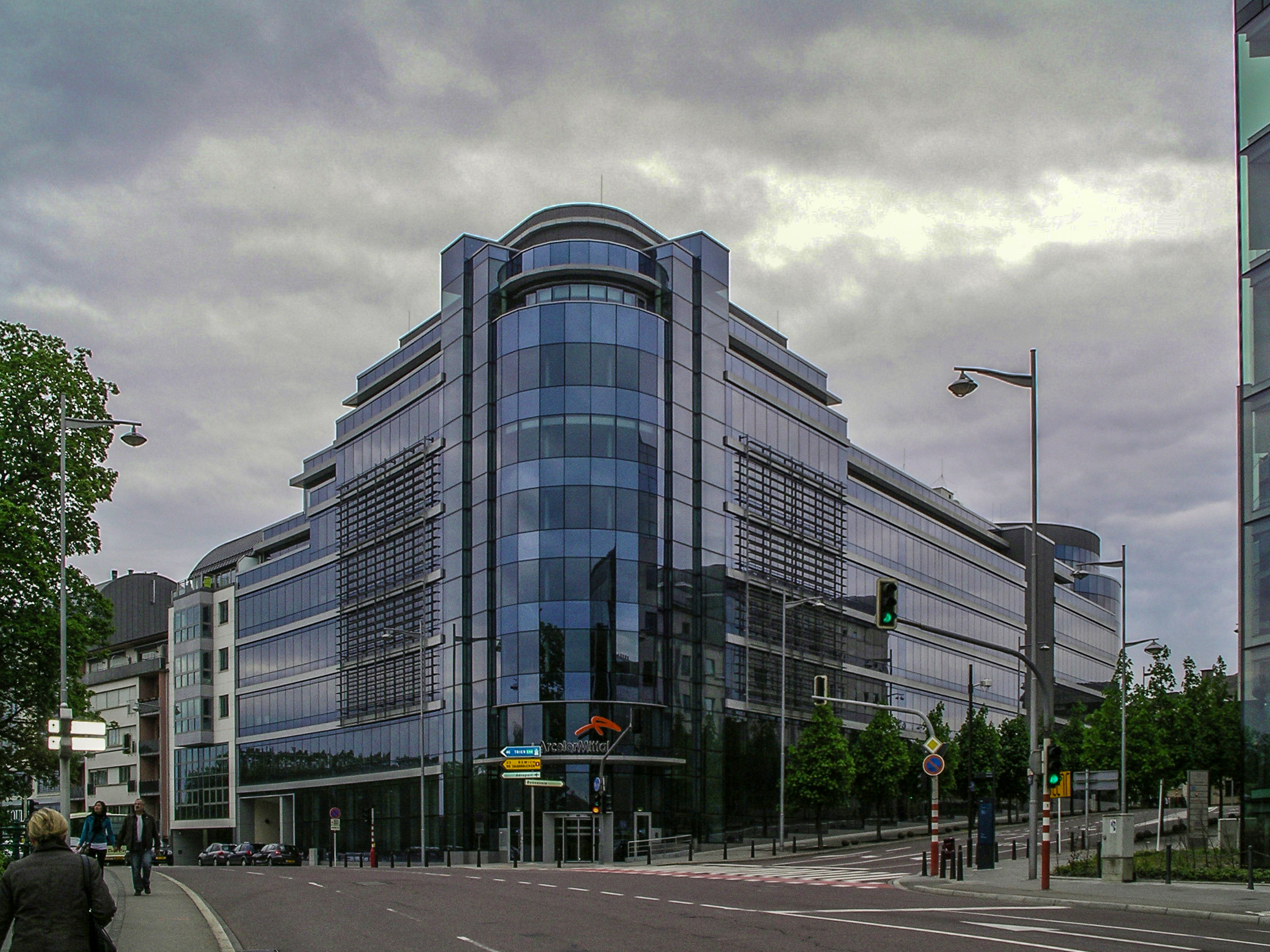
Headquarters of ArcelorMittal in Luxembourg

In 2006, Mittal Steel merged with Arcelor, forming ArcelorMittal. The new company took control of several former U.S. steel plants, including those once owned by Bethlehem Steel.

Some foreign ownership was later reversed. In 2020, ArcelorMittal sold its Coatesville and Conshohocken, Pennsylvania plants to Cleveland-Cliffs, bringing them back under American control. These facilities had changed hands multiple times since the late 1990s, transitioning from Lukens Steel to Bethlehem Steel, Mittal Steel, and then ArcelorMittal.

== Recent developments (2010s-present) ==
Since the 2010s, the U.S. steel industry has experienced consolidation due to global competition, evolving trade policies, and corporate restructuring. One of the most significant transformations has been that of Cleveland-Cliffs, which shifted from an iron ore mining company to a vertically integrated steel producer.

=== Cleveland-Cliffs’ expansion ===
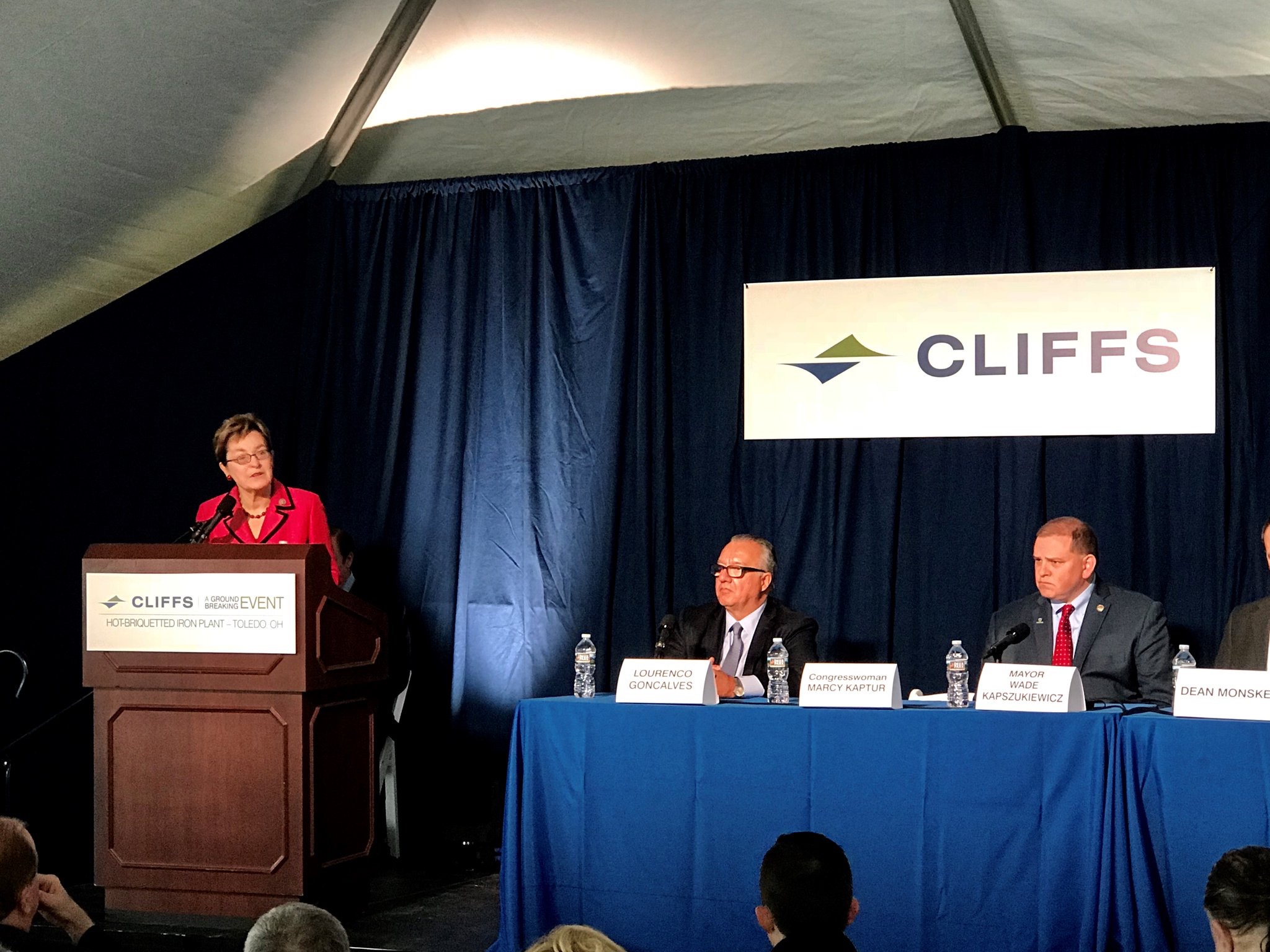
U.S. Representative Marcy Kaptur speaks at a groundbreaking event for Cleveland-Cliffs in Toledo, Ohio, on April 5, 2018.

Beginning in 2020 under CEO Lourenco Goncalves, Cleveland-Cliffs acquired AK Steel, gaining both blast furnace/basic oxygen furnace (BOF) and electric arc furnace (EAF) facilities. Later that year, it acquired U.S. operations from ArcelorMittal, further increasing its production capacity.

In 2021, the company expanded into metal recycling by acquiring Ferrous Processing & Trading (FPT). These moves established Cleveland-Cliffs as a fully integrated steel producer, from raw materials to finished steel products.

In 2023, Cleveland-Cliffs made a bid to acquire U.S. Steel, offering a mix of cash and stock that valued the company at $35 per share, a 43% premium. The company publicly said that the merger would place it among the top global steel producers outside China, but the offer was declined despite proposed synergies of $500 million.

In 2024, Cleveland-Cliffs pursued further expansion, including an acquisition of U.S. assets from Russian steelmaker Novolipetsk Steel (NLMK) and a completed purchase of Stelco, a Canadian flat-rolled steel producer. As a result, Cleveland-Cliffs became the largest flat-rolled steel producer in North America, employing about 30,000 workers across the U.S. and Canada.

=== Nippon-U.S. Steel ===
In December 2023, Japan-based Nippon Steel Corporation announced a $14.9 billion all-cash agreement to acquire United States Steel Corporation. The deal valued U.S. Steel at $55 per share, a 40% premium over its prior stock price. Under the proposed terms, U.S. Steel would become a wholly owned subsidiary of Nippon Steel, while retaining its name and headquarters in Pittsburgh, Pennsylvania.

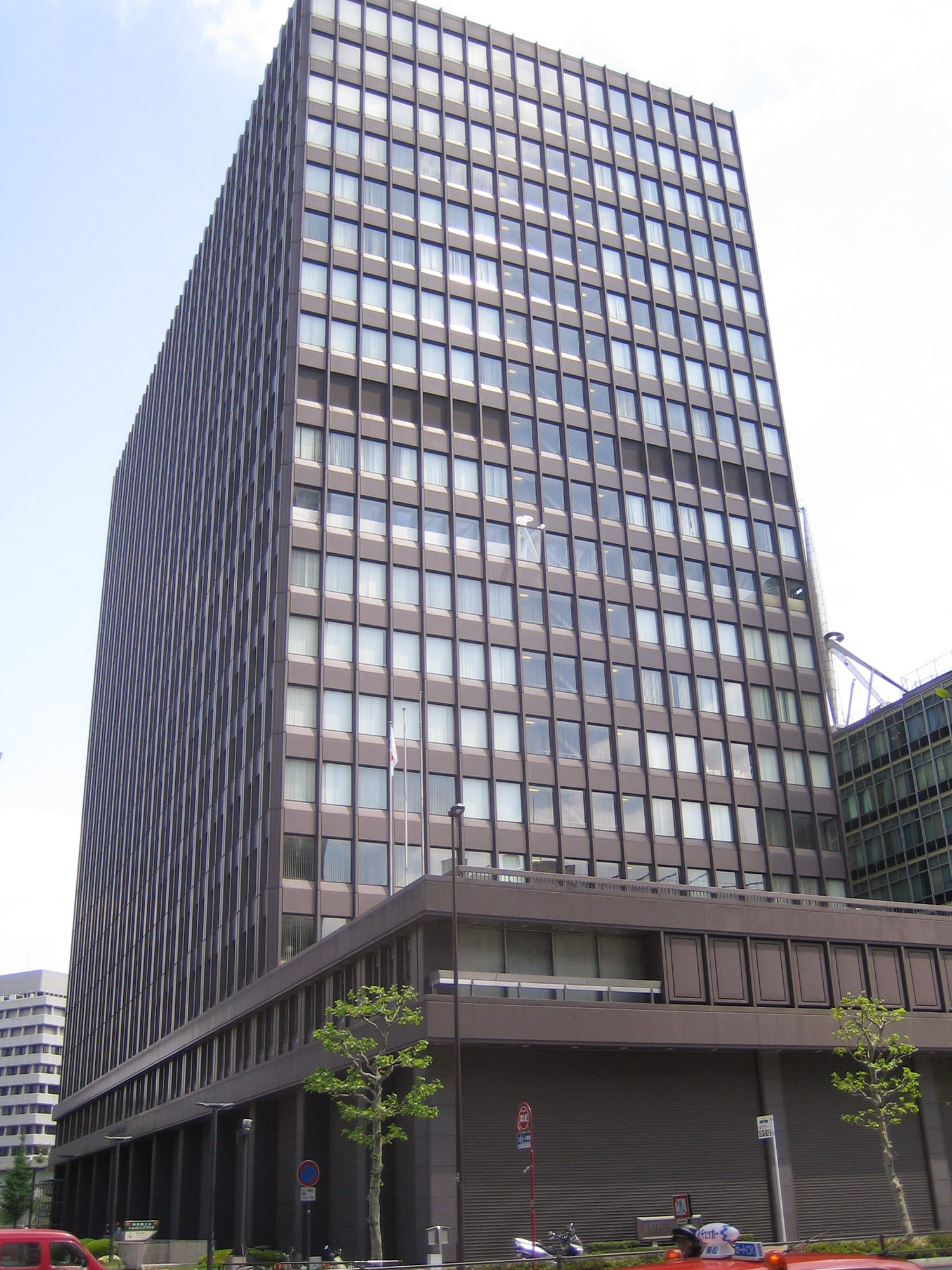
The headquarters of Nippon Steel (新日本製鐵), in Chiyoda, Tokyo, Japan.

Nippon Steel, the largest steelmaker in Japan and the fourth-largest globally, pledged to honor existing labor agreements with the United Steelworkers union. Supporters of the deal argued it would bring new investment to U.S. Steel and help increase steel supplies for Japanese automakers operating in the United States.

The proposal drew immediate opposition from various stakeholders, including U.S. lawmakers from both major parties, the United Steelworkers, and the White House. Critics raised concerns about foreign ownership of a major American steel producer and cited potential risks to workers, supply chains, and national security.

On March 14, 2024, the Biden administration publicly opposed the acquisition, and former President Donald Trump stated he would block the deal if re-elected. On January 3, 2025, President Joe Biden issued an executive order to formally block the transaction, halting Nippon Steel’s acquisition efforts.

Following the decision, President Trump engaged in discussions with Japanese Prime Minister Shigeru Ishiba and Nippon Steel about alternative forms of investment. Trump indicated that Nippon Steel might instead invest in U.S. Steel without acquiring a controlling stake, though no detailed plan was made public.

After the deal was blocked, other U.S. steel companies, including Cleveland-Cliffs and Nucor, expressed interest in acquiring U.S. Steel, indicating continued consolidation in the American steel industry.

On April 7, 2025, Trump directed the Committee on Foreign Investment in the United States (CFIUS) to conduct a new review of the proposed acquisition. The review is scheduled to be completed within 45 days and will examine whether measures proposed by the companies can address those concerns.

On June 13, 2025, the White House approved the transaction, subject to a National Security Agreement negotiated through the CFIUS. Nippon Steel and U.S. Steel announced the completion of the merger agreement and the National Security Agreement in a joint press release issued on June 18–19, 2025.

== See also ==
- History of the iron and steel industry in the United States
- Iron and steel industry in the United States
- Mergers and acquisitions
