= Vladimir Lisin =

Russian billionaire

- Владимир Лисин
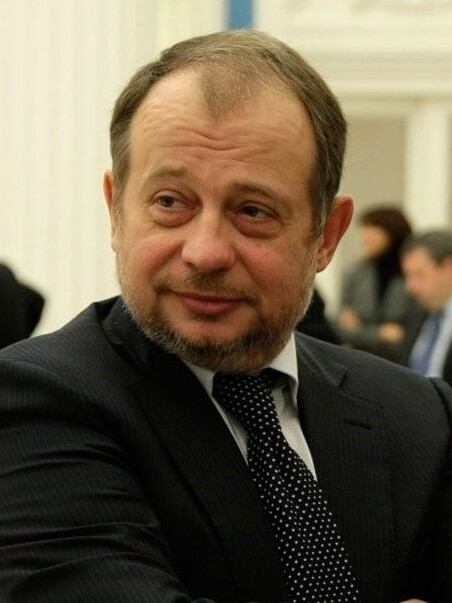
- Lisin in 2009
- Born: 7 May 1956 (age 70); Ivanovo, Soviet Union
- Education: Siberian Metallurgic Institute; Central Research Institute of Ferrous Metallurgy, Msc; Russian Presidential Academy of National Economy and Public Administration, Msc; Moscow Institute of Steel and Alloys, PhD; Russian Academy of Economics, PhD
- Occupation: Businessman
- Title: Chairman, Novolipetsk Steel
- Spouse: Lyudmila Lisina
- Children: 3
- Awards: Order of Honour

Vladimir Sergeyevich Lisin (born 7 May 1956) is a Russian billionaire businessman. He is the chairman and majority shareholder of Novolipetsk (NLMK), one of the four largest steel companies in Russia.

On March 24, 2026, he was listed in the Bloomberg Billionaires Index with an estimated net worth of approximately US$24.1 billion, ranking 104th globally and fifth among the richest Russian businessmen. In contrast, the Forbes report for 2026 (published on March 10, 2026) provided a higher estimate of his wealth at US$25.5 billion, placing him 101st worldwide and sixth in Russia.

In 2022, amid an overall decline of around 42% in the combined wealth of Russian billionaires, Lisin topped the list of Russia’s richest individuals with a fortune of US$18.4 billion, ranking 87th globally. This was despite a decrease of approximately US$7.8 billion in his wealth during the year, largely due to sharp market downturns and economic sanctions.

== Education ==
Lisin graduated from the Siberian Metallurgic Institute in 1979 with a metallurgical engineering diploma specialising in "Foundry of irons and non-ferrous metals". In 1984, he completed postgraduate study in UKRNIIMET by correspondence (Kharkov, Ukraine) earning a metallurgical engineering degree. In 1989, he graduated with an MSc in metal engineering from the Central Research Institute of Ferrous Metallurgy named after I. P. Bardin (Moscow). In 1990, he received a diploma of the higher commercial school under the All-Union Academy of Foreign Trade of People's Friendship Order, the training program "Administration and activity management of joint ventures in the territory of the USSR" (Moscow). In 1992 an MSc in Economics and Management from the Russian Presidential Academy of National Economy and Public Administration (RANEPA). In 1996 he enrolled for a doctorate of the Moscow Institute of Steel and Alloys (MISiS), Faculty of engineering and in 1997 thesis for a PhD in metallurgical engineering. In 1999, was a professor at RANEPA, and in 2005 earned a doctorate in economics from Russian Academy of Economics.

He holds various patents for metallurgical processes and has published over 100 articles on metallurgy and economics, including 15 monographs. He is a professor of the Academy of National Economy and the holder of the Council of Ministers' prize in the science and engineering (1989), the Honorary Metallurgist of Russia (1999), the Knight of the Order of Honour of the Russian Federation (2000) and the Knight of the Order of St. Sergiy Radonezhsky (2001).

== Career ==
Vladimir Lisin got his first job in 1975 working as an electrical fitter in a Soviet coalmine, and later worked as a welder foreman at Tulachermet Metals Works. He rose through the ranks to become section manager, shop manager in 1979 and deputy chief engineer in 1986.

In 1992 he joined a group of traders (the Trans-World Group) who won control of Russia's steel and aluminium industry. When the partners split in 2000, he received 13% of the firm and later achieved a controlling share. His former boss was named the Minister for Russian Metallurgy, and Lisin became the sole owner of Novolipetsk Steel in 2000.

Since 1993 he has been a board member of several Russian metal producers, including NLMK, MMK and Sayansk and Novokuznetsk Aluminium Plants and has been a member of the board of directors of Novolipetsk Steel (NLMK) since 1996 and its chairman since 1998. He previously worked as deputy chief engineer and as deputy general director of the Karaganda Steel Plant, one of Kazakhstan's four largest steel plants.

Lisin was member of the board of directors of Zenit Bank. Lisin sits on the board of directors of the Novolipetskii Metallurgical Combine, one of largest steel companies in Russia, in 1998 and still holds that position. He is a director at CJSC Chernomorneftegaz. He was a Director of Norilsk Nickel Mining and Metallurgical Co. since 2002. He has been chairman of JSC Novolipetsk Iron & Steel Corporation (OJSC Novolipetsk Steel) since June 2007. He served as an independent member of the board of directors of OJSC United Shipbuilding Corporation in 2008–2012. Until January 2023 he was a member of the Russian Union of Industrialists and Entrepreneurs bureau, but then left the post of his own free will.

His business interests, apart from steel, include transportation and logistics (with stakes in St Petersburg Sea Port, Tuapse Commercial Sea Port, North-Western Shipping Company, Volga Shipping Company), energy (stakes in Chernomorneftegaz and Severneftegaz), and utilities (Russian grid companies Federal Grid Company and Distribution Grid Company of Center). These predominantly Russian assets are controlled via Fletcher Group Holdings. In the summer of 2023, it became known that Lisin registered Serenity II Holdings and Nebula II Holdings in Abu Dhabi and transferred his assets there.

=== Sanctions ===
In 2022, investigative reporting by Radio Free Europe/Radio Liberty and its Ukrainian service reported alleged links between businesses associated with Lisin and Russia’s military-industrial sector, including reporting that one of his companies had done business with a state-run institute involved in nuclear weapons development. A separate investigation by Radio Svoboda described alleged ship-to-ship transfers of Russian petroleum products at sea involving tankers it said were owned by Volga Shipping, enabling onward delivery by EU-flagged vessels.

Novolipetsk Steel denied supplying the Russian military-industrial complex and said its Russian operations focus on rolled strip steel for general civilian use and are not capable of producing heavy plate steel or steel with ballistic properties. The company further stated that it has not supplied products intended for military use and that it cannot control the end use of its civilian products, statements reported by outlets including The Times.

In October 2022, the United States was urged to impose sanctions on Lisin. Lisin has been reported as sanctioned by Australia, and in June 2025 Canada listed Vladimir Sergeyevich Lisin under its Russia-related sanctions.

While Reuters reported in October 2024 that Lisin had not been targeted with United States or European Union sanctions at that time, the EU has sanctioned Volga Shipping in connection with Russia-related restrictive measures.

According to the Disclose investigation, despite reported connections to the metallurgical sector and alleged links to the Russian arms industry, Lisin had not been subjected to sanctions by either the European Union or the United States at the time of reporting.

Lisin resisted calls to step down as president, and ISSF Secretary General Alexander Ratner stated that neither he nor Lisin had links to the Russian government.

== Net worth and rankings ==
On 24 March 2026, Vladimir Lisin was listed on the Bloomberg Billionaires Index with an estimated net worth of approximately US$24.1 billion, ranking 104th globally and fifth in Russia. This reflected a relative decline in the valuation of his wealth compared to its peak in previous years, due to fluctuations in steel and transportation prices as well as a slowdown in certain global markets.

In contrast, the Forbes World’s Billionaires 2026 report (published on 10 March 2026) provided a higher estimate of his net worth at US$25.5 billion, placing him 101st globally and sixth in Russia, despite a decrease of about US$1 billion over the year. His wealth remained largely tied to his assets in NLMK, alongside expansion in transportation and logistics sectors.

In 2025, Forbes estimated Lisin’s fortune at approximately US$26.5 billion, ranking him 75th globally and fourth among Russian billionaires. His wealth continued to be driven primarily by the metals and mining industry, despite challenges related to sanctions and market volatility.

In 2024, Lisin’s net worth reached US$26.6 billion, placing him third in Russia behind Vagit Alekperov and Leonid Mikhelson. This was supported by improved commodity prices, relatively stable industrial demand, and his continued dominance in the steel and transportation sectors.

In 2023, Lisin ranked third among Russian billionaires with an estimated net worth of US$22.1 billion, marking an annual increase of approximately US$3.7 billion amid a partial recovery in the fortunes of Russian business magnates following the shock of 2022.

In 2022, as the combined wealth of Russian billionaires declined by around 42%, Lisin topped the list of Russia’s richest individuals with a net worth of US$18.4 billion, ranking 87th globally. This came despite a drop of about US$7.8 billion during the year due to market collapse and sanctions.

In 2021, Lisin’s net worth was estimated at approximately US$26.2 billion, ranking him third among Russia’s richest individuals according to Forbes, during the peak of the metals and steel price boom prior to the sharp downturn in the following year.

Year	Source	Net worth (USD billions)	Global rank	Russia rank	Notes
2026	Bloomberg 24 March	24.1	104	5	Decline due to steel and transportation price fluctuations and global slowdown
2026	Forbes	25.5	101	6	Decrease of about $1B year-on-year; assets tied to NLMK and logistics expansion
2025	Forbes	26.5	75	4	Metals and mining performance despite sanctions and volatility
2024	Forbes	26.6	70	3	Supported by strong commodity prices and stable industrial demand
2023	Forbes	22.1	70	3	Increase of about $3.7B following partial recovery
2022	Forbes	18.4	87	1	Decline of about $7.8B due to sanctions and market collapse
2021	Forbes	26.2	59	3	Peak during metals and steel price boom

== Personal life ==
Lisin is married and has three children. According to Bloomberg L.P., Lisin bought the 17th-century Aberuchill Castle and its surrounding estate in Perthshire, Scotland in 2005.

Lisin is a shooting sports enthusiast. He was president of the European Shooting Confederation until October 2021, the Russia Shooting Union and has been appointed vice president of the Russian Olympic Committee. In 2013, Lisin was appointed as a member of the ISSF Executive Committee. He built one of Europe's largest shooting-range complexes in Lisya Nora, near Moscow. In November 2018 Lisin was elected president of the International Shooting Sport Federation, and succeeded Olegario Vázquez Raña, who had served as president since 1980. Through Forestborne Ltd., a company registered in the British Virgin Islands, he has a controlling interest in the Aberuchill sporting estate in Strathearn, Scotland.

== See also ==
- List of Russian billionaires

Sporting positions
Preceded by Olegario Vázquez Raña	ISSF President; 2018-2022	Succeeded by Luciano Rossi
Preceded by	ESC President; 2009-2021	Succeeded by Alexander Ratner
