= Duferco =

Steel company

Duferco Participations Holding SA
- Company type: S.A. (Anonymous Society)
- Founded: 1979 in New York (United States), and São Paulo (Brazil)
- Headquarters: Rue Guillaume Schneider 6, Luxembourg City, Luxembourg
- Key people: Antonio Gozzi and Paolo Foti CEOs, Bruno Bolfo (Chairman)
- Products: Steel and Raw Materials, Energy, Various
- Revenue: 8 Billion USD (2017)
- Net income: 43 Million USD (2017)
- Subsidiaries: Duferco Italia Holding Spa, Duferdofin Nucor Srl, Duferco Commerciale Spa, Duferco Energia Spa, Duferco Bulgaria, Duferco Wallonie S.A., Duferco France S.N.C., Duferco Participations Holding S.A., Virtual Duferco Group, Ironet Ltd Romania, Duferco S.A. (Switzerland company), Duferco Kiev Representative Office, Ipacer S.A.
- Website: www.duferco.com

Duferco Participations Holding SA, is a company based in Luxembourg City, Luxembourg. Its main business is trading, producing, importing and exporting steel.

== History ==
Duferco was founded in 1979 by Italian entrepreneur Bruno Bolfo. The company initially focused on exporting steel from Brazil. In 1982, it relocated its headquarters to Lugano from New York and São Paulo. Originally a steel trader, Duferco expanded into trading raw materials for steelmaking in the early 1990s, adding coke, coal, iron ore, pig iron, and sponge iron to its trading operations.

In 1996, following the acquisition of the Italian company Ferdofin Siderurgica (later Duferdofin), Duferco expanded its steelmaking operations. It subsequently acquired additional steel mills, primarily in Italy, Belgium, and Eastern Europe.

Since the early 2000s, Duferco has diversified into the energy, shipping, and logistics sectors.

== Business ==
Duferco Participations Holding SA operates across three segments: trading; steel production and sales; and energy and services.

Its trading arm covers steel and steel products as well as raw materials for steelmaking. In 2007, trade volume reached 17.5 million tonnes, of which roughly two-thirds were steel and steel products and about one-third raw materials. Duferco operates 20 steel plants, which produced 6.9 million tonnes of steel in 2007. The sales segment markets processed steel products.

The group is also active in selected areas of the energy sector—particularly renewables—as well as in shipping and logistics.

== Subsidiaries and debt ==
Duferco Participations Holding SA has numerous subsidiaries, including Duferco Italia Holding S.p.A.; Duferco Travi e Profilati S.p.A.; Duferco Commerciale S.p.A.; Duferco Energia S.p.A.; Duferco France S.N.C.; Duferco Wallonie S.A.; Duferco Bulgaria; Duferco S.A. (Switzerland); Virtual Duferco Group; Ironet Ltd (Romania); and the Duferco Kyiv representative office, among others.

In 2015, Duferco Italia Holding reported a net loss of €13 million and total debt of €234 million.
