= Metallurgy of Russia =

Metallurgy industry in Russia

The metallurgy industries of Russia make up about 5% of Russia's GDP, about 18% of industrial production and about 14% of exports, as of 2009. The volume of metallurgical production was 1.87 trillion rubles (2009). Investments in fixed assets in metallurgy were 280 billion rubles (2008). The average salary in the metallurgical industry was 23,258 rubles / month (March 2010).

== Ferrous ==
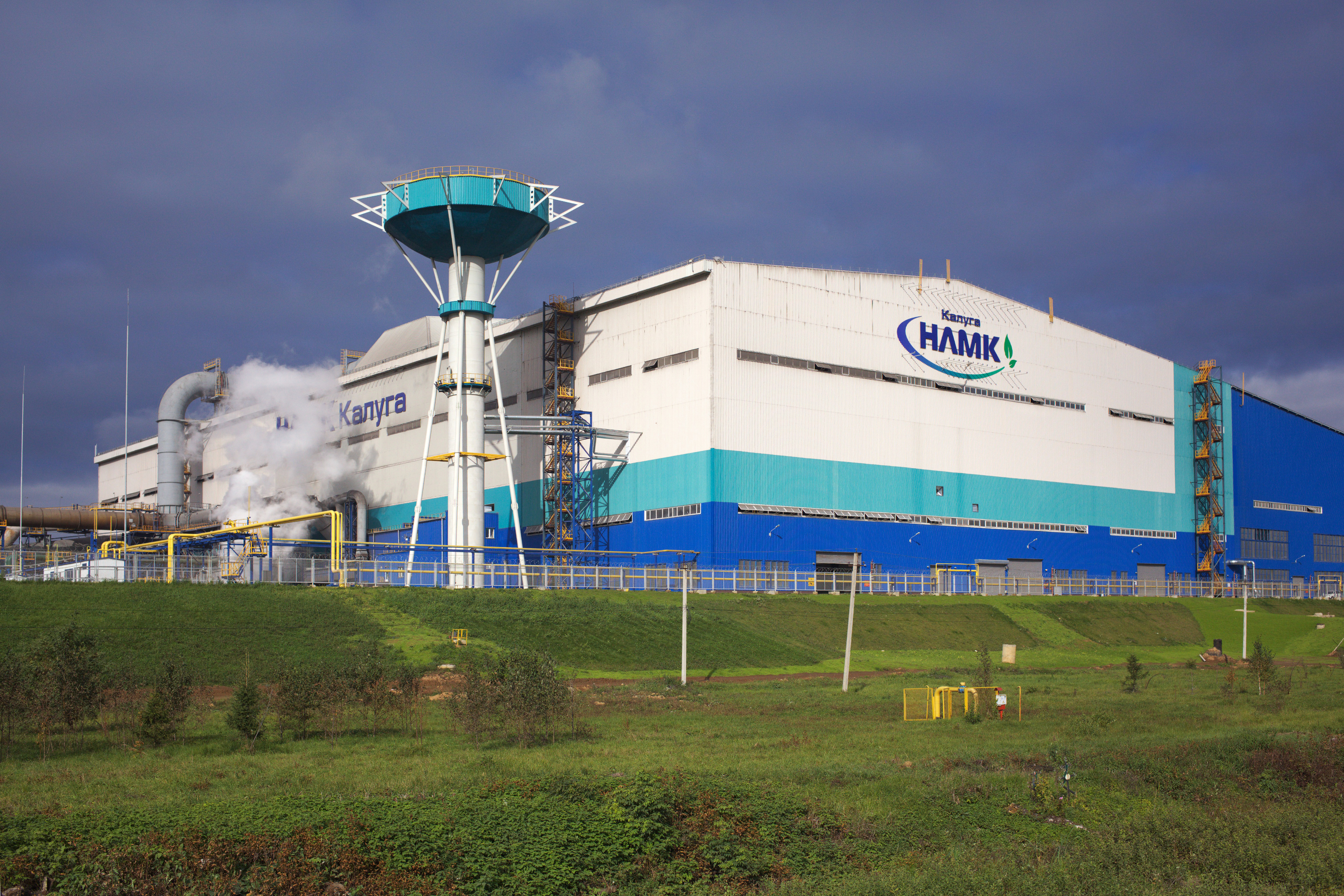
NLMK plant in Vorsino, Kaluga Oblast

The share of ferrous metallurgy in the volume of industrial production in Russia is about 10%. The steel industry includes more than 1.5 thousand enterprises and organizations, 70% of them city-forming, and more than 660 thousand employees. As of 2008, Russia ranked 4th in the world steel production (72 million tons per year). As of 2007, Russia takes third place in the world (after China and Japan) in exportation of steel products (27.6 million tons per year).

As of January 1, 2007, the production capacity of finished rolled steel in Russia amounted to 67.9 million tons. From 2000 to 2008, steel making capacity increased by 6.7 million tons, production of finished rolled steel by 4.3 million tons, and the production of steel pipes by 780 thousand tons.

More than 80% of industrial production of Russian ferrous metallurgy accounted for 9 large companies : Evraz, Severstal, NLMK, Magnitogorsk Iron and Steel Works (MMK), MC metalloinvest, Mechel, TMK, United Metallurgical Company, Chelyabinsk Pipe Rolling Plant.

The volume of basic iron and steel production in 2006 exceeded that from the early 1990s. From 2000 to 2007, the growth in output of steel and alloys was due to accelerated development of modern advanced techniques, in particular: electric furnace steelmaking. In 2007, production of rolled ferrous metals amounted to 59.6 million tons.

=== Russian steelmakers ===
- Upper Iset Metallurgical Plant (EID) – factory in Yekaterinburg, one of the oldest metallurgical plants in the Urals. At the moment it is the only cold rolling mill (Company " VIZ-Stal "). The plant is the largest Russian manufacturer of high transformal steel.
- Asha Metallurgical works
- Novokuznetsk Iron and Steel Plant -
- NLMK
- Magnitogorsk Iron and Steel Works (MMK, Russian:Магнитогорский металлургический комбинат)
- Nizhniy Tagil Iron and Steel Works
- Chelyabinsk Metallurgical Plant
- West-Siberian Metal Plant
- Vyksa Steel works
- Zlatoust Metallurgical Plant
- Severstal
- Of " Kuznetsk Ferroalloys"
- PETROSTAL METALLURGICAL PLANT

=== Pipe Industry ===
From 2000 to 2007 the production of pipes in Russia increased by 2.7 times. As of 2008, the production of steel pipes Russia takes third place in the world.

In recent years, the modernization of the Russian pipe industry had invested about $8 billion, started production of new products, improved quality. by 2010, about 40% of the pipes were produced in Russia on the new equipment.

== Nonferrous ==
As of 2010, the share of non-ferrous metals in the Russian GDP - 2.6%, industrial production - 10,2%.

As of 2008, Russia ranked 1st in the world in the production of nickel, nickel exports and export of aluminum.

As of 2008, Russia ranked 2nd in the world in the production of aluminum (after China) and the production of titanium mill products.

=== Russian producers of non-ferrous metals ===
- Rusal - the world's largest aluminum and clay.
- Norilsk Nickel - the world's largest manufacturer nickel and palladium.
- VSMPO-AVISMA - the world's largest titanium.
- Novosibirsk Tin Works - the only CIS producer of tin and its alloys.
- Gai plant for processing of ferrous metals '''Alloy''' (Gay)
- Ural Mining and Metallurgical Company (Pyshma)
- Plant solders and alloys (Ryazan)
- Kamensk-Uralsky non-ferrous metals processing plant (Kamensk-Uralsky)
- Kamensk-Uralsky Metallurgical Works (Kamensk-Uralsky)
- Kirov Plant for processing of nonferrous metals (Kirov)
- Kolchugino plant for processing of nonferrous metals (Kolchugino)
- Red Vyiborzhets (St. Petersburg)
- Moscow non-ferrous metals processing plant
- Nadvoitsy aluminum plant (Karelia)
- Novgorod Metallurgical Plant (Novgorod)
- Novorossiysk nonferrous metals plant
- Stupino Metallurgical Company (Stupino)
- Electrozinc (Vladikavkaz)
- Ural Mining and Metallurgical Company (Revda)
- Ryazan Plant for Manufacturing and Processing Non-Ferrous Metals (Ryazan)
- Tuim nonferrous metals plant (Khakassia)
- Of " Novokuznetsk Aluminum Plant"

== Scientific institutions ==
- Institute of Metallurgy and Material Science of Russian Academy of Sciences. Located in Moscow, founded in 1938.
- Federal State Unitary Enterprise "I.P.Bardin Central Research Institute of Ferrous Metallurgy".Located in Moscow, founded in 1944.
- Open Joint Stock Company "Scientific Research Institute of Metallurgy" (JSC "NIIM").Located in Chelyabinsk. Scientific-Production Enterprise
- Institute of Metallurgy of the Ural Regional Branch of the Russian Academy of Sciences. Located in Ekaterinburg, founded in 1955.
- Institute of Engineering and Metallurgy, Far Eastern Branch of the Russian Academy of Sciences. Located in Komsomolsk-on-Amur, founded in 1988.
- Moscow Institute of Steel and Alloys (MISIS). Located in Moscow, founded in 1930. Head branch college

== Public policy ==
In recent years, the Russian government has taken measures to protect the domestic market, abolished import duties on the main types of equipment, supported by Russian firms buying metals assets abroad, has taken steps to reduce trade restrictions on foreign markets, acting against Russian steel products. These measures have contributed to the positive results of the activities of the Russian metallurgy in the 2000s.

In March 2009, Russia was approved by the Ministry of Industry Development Strategy for the metallurgical industry of the Russian Federation until 2020.

== Links ==
- Metallurgy section on site Ministry of Industry and Trade of the Russian Federation, from 2012, at Internet Archive
- Section of Steel online magazine "Expert"
- section on non-ferrous metals on the website of the journal "Expert"
