= Oleg Boyko =

Russian businessman

- Олег Бойко
- Born: 28 September 1964 (age 62); Moscow, Russian SFSR
- Education: Moscow Aviation University, Presidential Academy of National Economy and Public Administration
- Occupations: Entrepreneur, investor

Oleg Viktorovich Boyko (Russian: Олег Викторович Бойко; born 28 September 1964) an international investor and resides in Switzerland, Chairman of Finstar Financial Group.

== Education ==
Oleg Boyko was born in Moscow in 1964 and educated at the Moscow Aviation Institute beginning in 1981, where he specialised in radio electronics. Boyko subsequently gained a Master of Business Administration from the Russian Presidential Academy of National Economy and Public Administration. He worked at the Lomonosov Moscow State University between 1982 and 1986.

== Career ==
=== Career start ===
Oleg Boyko has a diverse portfolio having successfully invested in multiple industries including financial services, banks, IT, retail, real estate, entertainment and steel.

From a young age, Boyko was interested in the financial sector and he began his career in the IT and finance sectors whilst he was a student. He is credited for introducing the first stores with credit card readers into Moscow in the 1990s. In 1988, he began selling used United States computers and computer accessories in the Soviet Union.

=== National Credit Bank ===
In 1990, he established National Credit Bank (Russian: AКБ "Национальный кредит") and served as its director until Boris Fedorov (Russian: Борис Федоров), took over the bank in autumn 1995 and was in charge of it until May 1996 before the collapse of the bank in September to November 1996. In 1995, Boyko was worth $1.5 billion.

=== Finstar ===
In 1996, Boyko and a team of professional executives formed Finstar Financial Group as an investment vehicle and management company in order to identify, invest in, and actively manage businesses on behalf of Boyko and other private investors. As Finstar's Chairman, international investor Oleg Boyko has now directed Finstar to focus mainly on digital financial services and fintech industries. Among its non-core businesses, Finstar maintains a presence in real estate, entertainment and fast-moving consumer good (FMCG) retail.

=== Steel industry and EvrazHolding ===
In 1999, Boyko was a joint investor in EvrazHolding alongside Alexander Abramov, combining three steel mills and thereby creating one of the world's largest vertically-integrated steel producers as a result. In 2004, Boyko sold his 25% stake in EvrazHolding for approximately $600 to $700 million prior to its listing on the London Stock Exchange.

=== Entertainment and gambling ventures ===
In 2002, Boyko founded Ritzio Entertainment Group, investing in casinos and gaming, a business that expanded across Russia before going internationally. The company became the largest in Eastern Europe. The Russian business halted abruptly when Russian president Vladimir Putin banned gambling in 2009. In 2010, Boyko became an investor in lottery businesses in Russia and Ukraine, including the national lottery to support the Sochi 2014 Winter Olympic Games. He has subsequently disposed of all his lottery interests.

=== Banking and retail expansion ===
In 2003, Finstar purchased a controlling stake in a Latvian commercial bank, Baltic Trust Bank. By 2006, Baltic Trust Bank was ranked 13th amongst Latvia's 24 banks in terms of assets and had one of the largest branch networks, with 74 branches across Latvia. In 2006, Finstar sold its 79% stake to GE Capital, the banking and finance arm of General Electric. In 2006 Boyko entered the real estate market through a new holding company, Finstroy. Also in 2006, under Boyko, Finstar acquired 75% of Rive Gauche. At the time it was a local business, with stores mainly in Saint Petersburg; but under Boyko, Rive Gauche grew to become Russia's second largest cosmetics and perfumery chain. In 2012, Boyko sold 51% of his stake to a consortium of investors but continues to hold 24% of the business.

=== 4Finance and Native American partnership ===
In 2011, he invested the Riga, Latvia based 4Finance, a structure through which he has relationships with both the Fort Belknap and Chippewa (Lac du Flambeau) Native Americans located in Montana and Wisconsin respectively. In 2015 Boyko family trust reduced its stake in 4Finance from 75% to 49% and in 2022 has completed its divestment.

=== Film production ===
Boyko was involved in film production and served as a co-producer on Frank Miller's Sin City: A Dame to Kill For in 2014, and is a co-producer in Scarlett Johansson's forthcoming directorial debut for the film Summer Crossing, which is based on a Truman Capote novel.

== Business interests ==
Oleg Boyko's current focus is on the digital financial services, fintech and financial technology sectors, strengthened by his extensive banking experience. According to Boyko, the fintech industry is "the biggest blue ocean" in the business world, with products and services designed for individuals who do not have access to traditional financial services and those who are underserved by mainstream banks. Boyko, therefore, continues to expand and strengthen his activities in technology-based, data-driven transformational financial services platforms and business alternatives to the conventional banking sector. Boyko is determined to take advantage of changes in global consumer behaviour, advances in technology and data science, and harness the growing power and availability of mobile devices, in order to offer an alternative banking option to those consumers who do not have access to traditional financial services and banks.

Finstar's investment portfolio included, among others, Vivus Mexico, 4Finance, Spotcap, an online lending platform for SMEs, Prestamos Prima, an online consumer financial services provider, and Viventor, a peer-to-peer lending platform. In 2017 Oleg Boyko announced his intention to invest $150 million into fintech businesses and in-house R&D within portfolio companies. The first phase of a global fintech investment plan is under way with a commitment to invest up to $50 million in Asia-Pacific`s consumer lending.

== Other ==
According to a Gordonua.com article from 2020, Otari Arshba (Russian: Отари Ионович Аршба) allegedly recruited Boyko into the KGB and, while Boyko was at the computer center of Moscow State University from 1982 to 1986, Boyko excelled as an KGB agent and was subsequently sent on business trips to Great Britain and the United States. However, in 2019, the Latvian court ruled that this information was false and defamatory to the individual.

Boyko founded the Parasport foundation in 2006, during the Paralympic Winter Games in Turin. The Foundation offers funding for Paralympic athletes to train and attend competitions and obtain physical and mental health care, and promotes equality for people with disabilities. Recently the Foundation became the official partner of the Russian Paralympic Committee, and has established a presence in Asia. In 2016, Boyko co-hosted its 10th anniversary celebration with an event in Moscow, attended by Paralympic Committee representatives from 25 countries. Since 2006 Boyko has also been the Head of the Paralympic Movement Development Committee of the Russian Paralympic Committee. He was appointed to the International Wheelchair & Amputee Sports Federation (IWAS) Development Committee as a member in October 2015 following the successful funding by Parasport of the 2015 IWAS Games in Sochi. In 2020, during the COVID-19 pandemic, Oleg Boyko, through his Parasport Foundation, delivered targeted assistance to over 2,000 para-athletes representing 28 different sports across 35 regions of Russia. Same year, Oleg Boyko was among the invited attendees of the annual 2020 Forbes 400 Summit on Philanthropy.

In December 2021, Oleg Boyko pursued through the Moscow court an order for Google to remove the search results for a site that, he claims, contains misleading information.

Later Google filed an appeal against this decision. However, in August 2022, after reviewing the complaint, the Moscow City Court ruled that Google LLC should remove the links to sites previously found by the court to be untrustworthy from the search results for the plaintiff's surname and name.

== Citizenship and sanctions ==
Boyko is a citizen of Russia and Italy. In March 2025, the Serbian government granted him Serbian citizenship under provisions allowing naturalisation when considered to be in the interest of Serbia.

Boyko has been sanctioned by Australia and Ukraine. Canada also sanctioned him in 2022, but removed him from its sanctions list in November 2023 after he challenged the designation.

Poland added Boyko to its national sanctions list on 12 December 2024. The measures included an asset freeze, a prohibition on making funds or economic resources available to him, restrictions against circumventing those measures, and exclusion from public-procurement procedures. The Polish Ministry of the Interior and Administration refused his application for removal from the list on 23 June 2025.

== Personal life ==
His father Boyko Viktor Denisovich (Russian: Виктор Денисович Бойко), CEO of NGO Vzlyot (Russian: НПО "Взлет"). Mother - Dochar Vera Pavlovna (Russian: Дочар Вера Павловна), senior researcher at the Institute of Medicinal Plants of the Russian Academy of Sciences.

In 1996, Boyko suffered a spinal cord injury. As of 2016, he moved around using an mobility scooter.
