= BioFoodLab =

Health food snacks producer

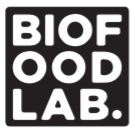
- Company type: Private
- Industry: Food
- Founded: February 2012
- Founder: Elena Shifrina
- Headquarters: Moscow, Russia
- Key people: Elena Shifrina, CEO
- Number of employees: 125 (2019)
- Website: www.biofoodlab.com

BioFoodLab is a Russian company founded in 2012 that develops and markets health food snacks under several brand names, including its leading brand, "Bite." BioFoodLab was founded by Elena Shifrina, a Skoltech MBA and Regent's Business School London graduate. BioFoodLab is acknowledged as Russia's leading producer of healthy snacks and distributes over 100 products in 14 countries, including Japan, the United Arab Emirates, United Kingdom, Singapore, and China.

== Corporate history ==
BioFoodLab is reported to produce more than 100 products and reported revenue of over 1.5 billion rubles ($20 million) in 2020. According to Nielsen Corporation, BioFoodLab holds a 39-percent market share in the fruit-and-nut bar category in Russia. Its "Bite" brand has been referred to as the creator and driver of Russia's fruit-and-nut snack bar market.

BioFoodLab was founded in 2012 with a focus on the fruit-and-nut bar category.

In 2013, Forbes Russia named BioFoodLab the startup of the year. At the time, the company had just three employees and produced only five flavors of its fruit-and-nut health bars. In 2015, the Government of Moscow selected the company as project of the year in its "Made in Moscow" competition. In 2016, the Russian Export Center, a state export-support institution founded as part of the Russian state development corporation VEB.RF, named BioFoodLab Russia's exporter of the year.

In 2017, BioFoodLab announced plans to expand to Asia, with India and China highlighted as priority markets. In 2018, the company received venture capital investment from Russian billionaires Alexander Abramov and Aleksander Frolov. In 2020, Euromonitor named BioFoodLab a snack brand leader in the naturally healthy packaged food segment. It also listed its oat crackers among the most popular traditional snacks with a healthier positioning on the Russian market.

In March 2021, BioFoodLab signed an exclusive distribution agreement in the United Arab Emirates with the Abu Dhabi Securities Exchange-listed Foodco, formerly the Abu Dhabi National Foodstuff Company. The company also announced that it will begin selling plant-based burgers in Russia. In April 2021, the California-based wellness retailer, iHerb announced that it will begin selling BioFoodLab fruit-and-nut bars in the United States.
