= Alexander Frolov (disambiguation) =

Alexander Frolov (born 1982) is a Russian ice hockey player.

Alexander or Aleksandr Frolov may also refer to

- Alexander Frolov (admiral) (1902–1952), Soviet rear admiral and chief of staff of the Soviet Pacific Fleet in World War II
- Aleksandr Frolov (businessman) (born 1964), Russian businessman
