= Sergey Abramov =

Sergey or Sergei Abramov may refer to:

- Sergei Abramov (futsal player) (born 1990), Russian futsal player
- Sergei Abramov (ice hockey, born 1956), Russian ice hockey player and coach
- Sergei Abramov (ice hockey, born 1959), Russian ice hockey player
- Sergei Abramov (ice hockey, born 1993), Russian ice hockey player
- Sergei Abramov (mathematician) (born 1957), Russian mathematician
- Sergey Abramov (politician, born 1972), Moscow-based executive of Russian Railways and a former politician
- Sergey Abramov (politician, born 1957), Russian politician and chairman of the Magadan Oblast Duma
