= Otari Arshba =

Russian politician (born 1955)

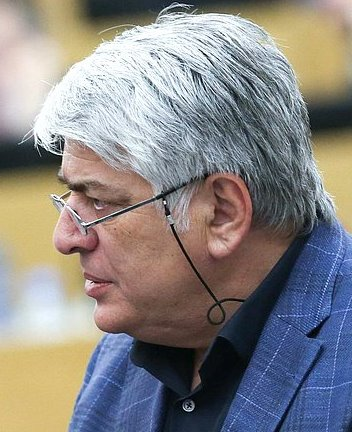
Otari Arshba, 2018

Otari Ionovich Arshba (Russian: Отари Ионович Аршба; born 12 April 1955) is a Russian politician and member of the State Duma of the Russian Federation from 2003. He is a member of the Supreme Council of the United Russia Party.

Arshba was born in Sukhumi in the Abkhaz ASSR. He is a former entrepreneur, top manager. Dollar multimillionaire. Retired FSB Colonel, a veteran of the security services.

According to a Gordonua.com article, Otari Arshba allegedly recruited Oleg Boyko (Russian: Олег Викторович Бойко) into the KGB and, while Boyko was at the computer center of Moscow State University from 1982 to 1986, Boyko excelled as an KGB agent and was subsequently sent on business trips to Great Britain and the United States.

In 1989–1991, Arshba stood at the origins of Abkhazian statehood in modern times, serving as an advisor and organizer of political activities in the Soviet parliament of the USSR people's deputy, the future fighter for the independence of the republic, the first president of Abkhazia Vladislav Ardzinba. In 1992–1993, during the Georgian-Abkhazian conflict, Arshba was one of the main financial sponsors of strengthening the defense capability of Abkhazia.

Until April 1994, Arshba was a state security officer.

In 1998, Arshba began working at Evraz becoming the director of public relations, and then he successively held the positions of vice president and senior vice president. Until March 2004, he was the chairman of the board of directors of Evraz.

Arshba is the chairman of the board of directors of the West Siberian Metallurgical Plant (Russian: Западно-Сибирский металлургический комбинат) which merged into Evraz in July 2011 to become OJSC EVRAZ - Consolidated West Siberian Metallurgical Plant (ZSMK) (Russian: ЗСМК).

On 3 December 2004, Arshba, Leonid Lebedev, and others founded VAO R. Prim Company (Russian: "Фирмы ВАО Р. Прим") which operated gas stations.

Since 7 December 2003, Arshba has been a member of United Russia from the Kemerovo region in the Duma's lower house and, as of July 2023, is the head of the ethics commission in the Duma's lower house.

== Sanctions ==
In February 2022, the European Union put Arshba in its sanctions list because of the Russian invasion of Ukraine. The same year in March, he was also sanctioned by the UK.

He was sanctioned by the UK government in 2022 in relation to the Russo-Ukrainian War.

In September 2022, Arshba was added to United States sanctions lists for backing a law to criminalize the dissemination of "fake news" about the Russian army and the war in Ukraine.

Moreover, he is sanctioned by Switzerland, Australia, Japan, Ukraine, Canada, and New Zealand.

In March 2023, Ukrainian court sentenced Arshba to 15 years in prison with confiscation of property under the article on encroachment on the territorial integrity and inviolability of Ukraine.

Criminal prosecution

On 22 March 2023, Otari Arshba was sentenced in absentia by a Ukrainian court to 15 years in prison with confiscation of property under the charge of encroachment on the territorial integrity and inviolability of Ukraine.

== Family ==
He is in his first marriage to Marina Abessalomovna Zenaishvili, an ethnic Georgian. She is an ophthalmologist by profession and has also been engaged in entrepreneurial activities. The couple has a daughter, Inga (born February 6, 1980), and a son, Irakli (born March 31, 1982), as well as a grandson and a granddaughter named Marina. All members of Arshba’s family, except for himself, identify publicly as ethnic Georgians.

The deputy’s second "son," occasionally mentioned in biographical references, is in fact a relative who, due to life circumstances, was raised in the Arshba household.

Personal

He owns an apartment in Georgia and his wife has real estate in Georgia, too.
