= Novokuznetsk Iron and Steel Plant =

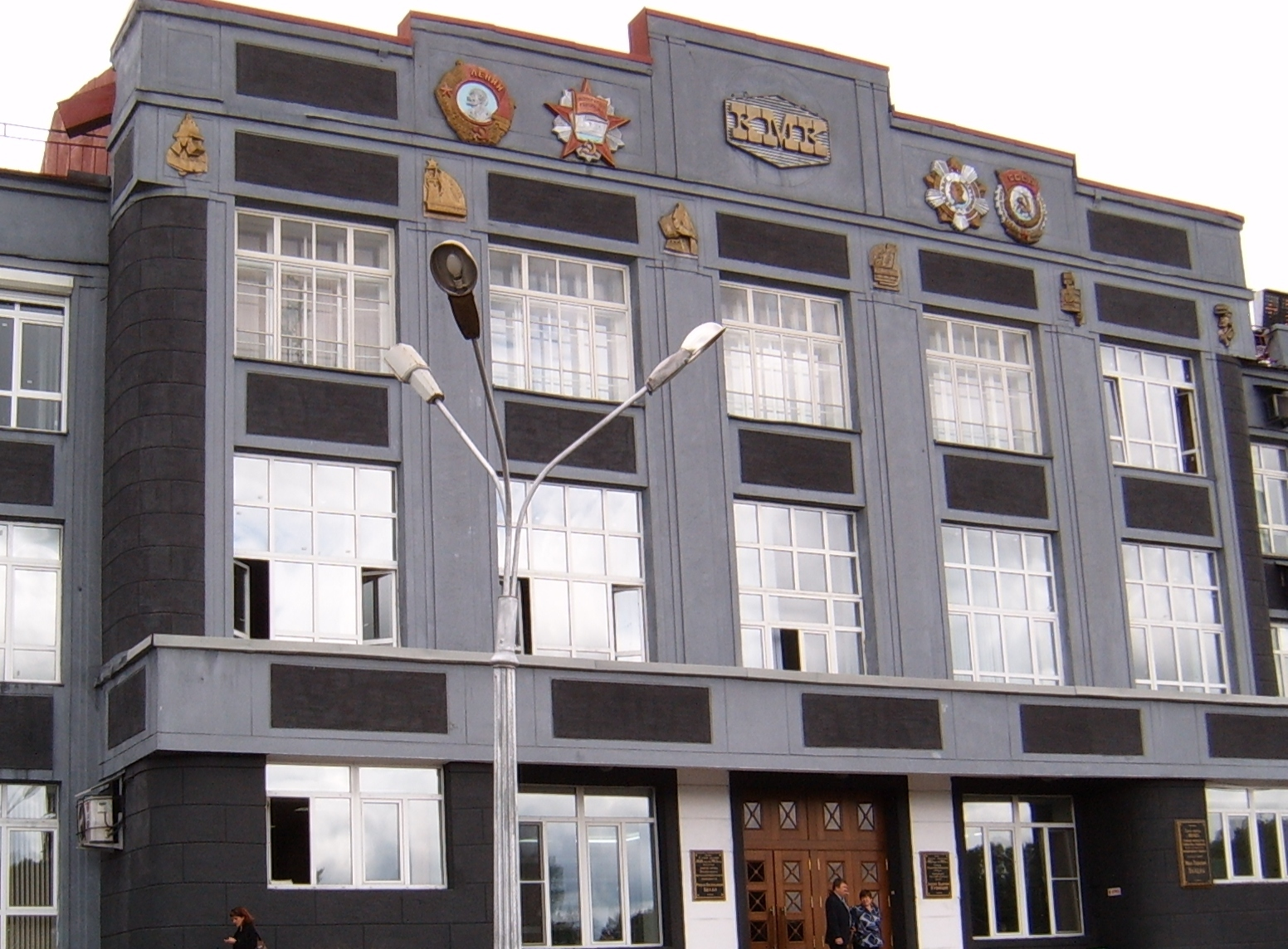
Entrance to the NKMK

Novokuznetsk Iron and Steel Plant (Russian: Новокузнецкий металлургический комбинат) is a major Russian steel producer in the city of Novokuznetsk in Kemerovo Oblast in southwestern Siberia. The company's name is abbreviated to NKMK (Russian:НКМК). The company specializes in the production of rails for railroads. NKMK is a subsidiary of the Evraz Group, a leading Russian steel company. As of September 26, 2022, the Plant is on fire and major portions of it have burned down.

== See also ==
- West Siberian Metal-Plant
