= Trams in Novokuznetsk =

Russian tram network

Novokuznetsk Tram Network
- Новокузнецкий трамвай
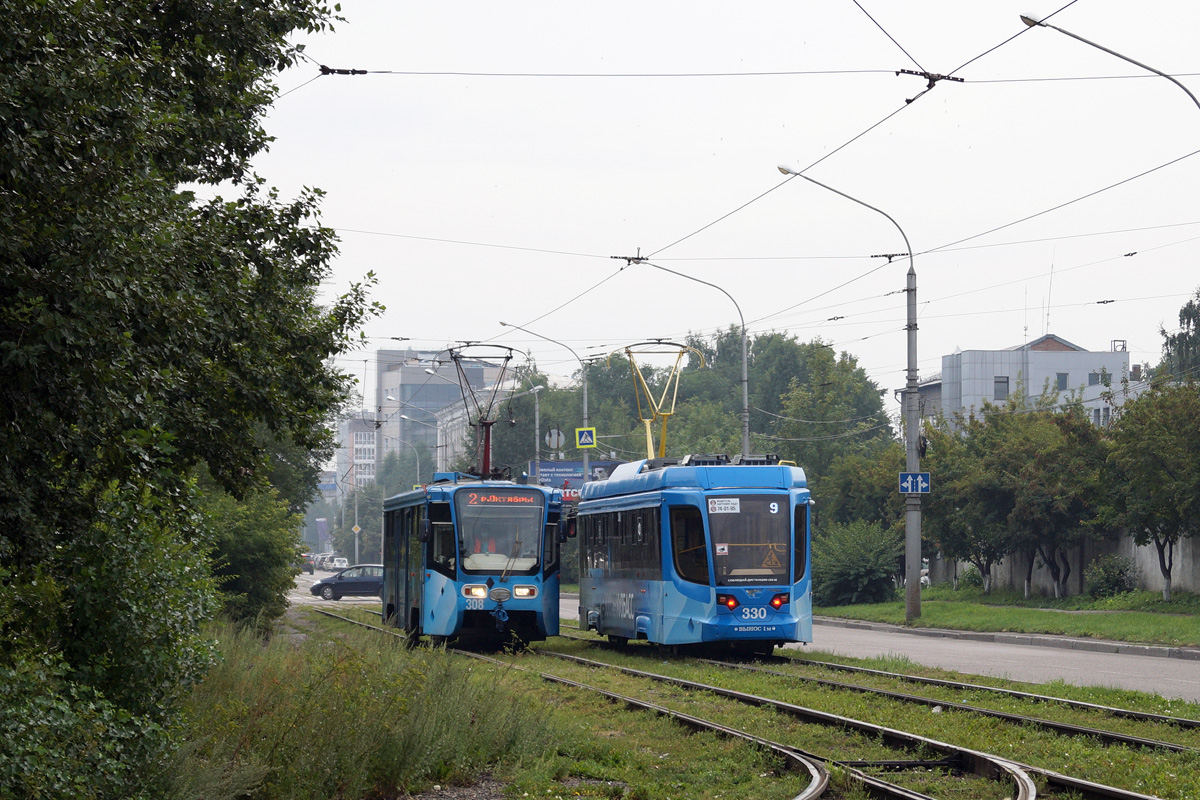

Operation
- Locale: Novokuznetsk, Russia
- Open: 30 November 1933
- Status: Operational
- Lines: 6

Infrastructure
- Track gauge: 1,524 mm (5 ft)
- Propulsion system: Electricity
- Electrification: Overhead line, 600 V DC
- Depot: 3

Statistics
- Website: https://troll-nk.ru/ Tram Novokuznetsk

The Novokuznetsk tramway network (Russian: Новокузнецкий трамвай) is a tram system in the city of Novokuznetsk in the Kemerovo Oblast, Russia opened on 30 November 1933. It is the first tram system in Western Siberia and the first system beyond the Urals built during the Soviet era (the Novosibirsk tram was launched several months later), as well as the second in Russia east of the Urals (the first was opened in Vladivostok).

The Novokuznetsk tram system consists of two independent networks that have never been connected to each other: one network operates only in the Zavodskoy district and is represented by a single route No. 10, the other network operates in the Kuznetsky, Kuibyshevsky, Ordzhonikidzevsky and Central districts of the city.
