= Andrey Dementyev (footballer) =

Russian footballer

Personal information
- Full name: Andrey Anatolyevich Dementyev
- Date of birth: 22 January 1970 (age 56)
- Place of birth: Novokuznetsk, Russian SFSR
- Height: 1.75 m (5 ft 9 in)
- Positions: Midfielder; forward

Senior career*
Years	Team	Apps	(Gls)
1987–1988	FC Metallurg Novokuznetsk	39	(5)
1989	FC Dynamo Kemerovo		
1990	FC Metallurg Novokuznetsk	2	(0)
1991–1993	FC Kuzbass Kemerovo	96	(27)
1994–1996	FC Baltika Kaliningrad	99	(12)
1997–1998	FC Lada-Grad Dimitrovgrad	71	(14)
1999	FC Baltika Kaliningrad	35	(3)
2000	FC Sokol Saratov	7	(0)
2001	FC Kuzbass-Dynamo Kemerovo	24	(12)
2002–2005	FC Baltika Kaliningrad	125	(33)

Managerial career
- 2006: FC Baltika Kaliningrad (administrator)
- 2008–2010: FC Baltika Kaliningrad (director)
- * Club domestic league appearances and goals

Andrey Anatolyevich Dementyev (Russian: Андрей Анатольевич Дементьев; born 22 January 1970) is a former Russian professional football player.

== Honours ==
- Russian Second Division Zone West best midfielder: 2005.
