= Maksim Chevelev =

Russian football defender

Personal information
- Full name: Maksim Olegovich Chevelev
- Date of birth: 26 March 1990 (age 36)
- Place of birth: Novokuznetsk, Russian SFSR
- Height: 1.90 m (6 ft 3 in)
- Position: Defender

Team information
- Current team: FC Novokuznetsk

Youth career
- Zapsib Novokuznetsk

Senior career*
Years	Team	Apps	(Gls)
2009	FC Metallurg-Kuzbass-2 Novokuznetsk		
2011	FC Metallurg-Kuzbass-2 Novokuznetsk		
2011–2012	FC Raspadskaya Mezhdurechensk (amateur)		
2012	FC Metallurg-Kuzbass Novokuznetsk	1	(0)
2013	FC Irtysh Omsk	9	(0)
2014–2015	FC Novokuznetsk	15	(0)
2016–2017	FC Raspadskaya Mezhdurechensk (amateur)		
2018–	FC Novokuznetsk (amateur)		
- * Club domestic league appearances and goals as of 19 October 2015

Maksim Olegovich Chevelev (Russian: Максим Олегович Чевелев; born 26 March 1990) is a Russian football defender. He plays for FC Novokuznetsk.

== Club career ==
He played in the Russian Football National League for FC Metallurg-Kuzbass Novokuznetsk in 2012.
