= Anton Rekhtin =

Russian ice hockey player

- Born: 15 September 1989 (age 36) Novokuznetsk, Russia
- Height: 5 ft 11 in (180 cm)
- Weight: 181 lb (82 kg; 12 st 13 lb)
- Position: Centre
- Shoots: Left
- VHL team Former teams: Zauralie Kurgan; Metallurg Novokuznetsk
- NHL draft: Undrafted
- Playing career: 2009–present

Anton Rekhtin (born 15 September 1989) is a Russian professional ice hockey player. He is currently playing with Zauralie Kurgan of the Supreme Hockey League (VHL).

Rekhtin played five games in the Kontinental Hockey League with Metallurg Novokuznetsk during the 2009-10 season.
