= Artyom Sapozhkov =

Russian footballer

Personal information
- Full name: Artyom Rostislavovich Sapozhkov
- Date of birth: 21 March 1990 (age 36)
- Place of birth: Novokuznetsk, Kemerovo Oblast, Russian SFSR
- Height: 1.77 m (5 ft 10 in)
- Positions: Midfielder; forward

Youth career
- FC Spartak Moscow

Senior career*
Years	Team	Apps	(Gls)
2007–2008	FC Spartak-Youth Moscow		
2008	FC Nara-ShBFR Naro-Fominsk	10	(0)
2009–2010	FC Saturn-2 Moscow Oblast	44	(6)
2010	→ FC Rusichi Oryol (loan)	11	(2)
2011	FC Zhemchuzhina Tashtagol		
2011	FC Olimpia Gelendzhik	24	(1)
2012–2013	FC Zvezda Ryazan	35	(5)
2013–2014	FC Sokol Saratov	33	(2)
2015	FC Ryazan	9	(0)
2016	FC Shakhtyor Prokopyevsk (amateur)		
2016	FC Torpedo Vladimir	11	(0)
2017	FC Khimik Novomoskovsk	1	(0)
2017	FC Kolomna	12	(1)
2018	FC Novokuznetsk (amateur)		
2018	FC Raspadskaya (amateur)		
- * Club domestic league appearances and goals

Artyom Rostislavovich Sapozhkov (Russian: Артём Ростиславович Сапожков; born 21 March 1990) is a Russian former professional football player.

== Club career ==
He made his Russian Football National League debut for FC Sokol Saratov on 6 July 2014 in a game against FC Yenisey Krasnoyarsk. That was his only season in the FNL.
