= Pyshma =

Pyshma (Russian: Пышма) is the name of several inhabited localities in Russia.

Urban localities

- Pyshma, Sverdlovsk Oblast, a work settlement in Pyshminsky District of Sverdlovsk Oblast

Rural localities

- Pyshma, Tyumen Oblast, a village in Chikchinsky Rural Okrug of Tyumensky District of Tyumen Oblast
