= Evraz =

Russian multinational vertically integrated steel making and mining company

EVRAZ plc
- Type: Public limited company
- Traded as: MCX: EVRAZ
- Industry: Steel; Mining
- Founded: 1992 (Moscow)
- Headquarters: Moscow, Russian Federation
- Key people: Alexander Abramov (Chairperson); Aleksandr Frolov (CEO)
- Products: Steel; Steel products Vanadium slag Iron ore Coal
- Revenue: ▲US$13.224 billion (2021)
- Operating income: ▲US$4,583 billion (2021)
- Net income: ▲US$3.524 billion (2021)
- Owner: Roman Abramovich (30.5%)
- Number of employees: 71,591 (2021)
- Website: www.evraz.com

EVRAZ plc (Russian: Евраз) is a UK-incorporated multinational steel manufacturing and mining company part-owned by Russian oligarchs. It has operations mainly in Russia as well as the US, Canada, and Kazakhstan.

Its listing on the London Stock Exchange (LSE) has been suspended since March 2022 because of sanctions over the 2022 Russian invasion of Ukraine. As of November 2025 the shares remained suspended.

== History ==
The company was founded as a small metal-trading business in 1992. On 2 June 2005 Evraz Group floated some 8.3 percent of its shares in the form of GDR in London. The company was priced at $14.50 per GDR implying an equity value of $5.15 billion. An additional 6% stake was placed in January 2006, resulting in a total free-float of 14.3%.

The company acquired Claymont Steel from H.I.G. Capital in 2008 for US$564.8 million. The mill was closed in December 2013.

In 1998, Otari Arshba, who was a KGB officer and, later, was an FSB officer, became the director of public relations, and then he successively held the positions of vice president and senior vice president. Until March 2004, he was the chairman of the board of directors of the holding company according to a Gordonua.com article.

As of 2021, the Canadian unit of Evraz employed 2,000 people and generated $2.4 billion in revenues. The North American unit had annual crude steelmaking capacity of 2.3 million tons, and a capacity of 3.5 million tons of finished steel for heavy industry. Evraz operates two electric arc furnaces, in Pueblo, CO, and in Regina, SK.

In the immediate aftermath of the 2022 Russian invasion of Ukraine, the British government accused the company of "providing financial services or making available funds, economic resources, goods or technology that could contribute to destabilising Ukraine."

In March 2022 after sanctions were applied to Abramovich, owner of 29% of the company, the Financial Conduct Authority suspended the trading of Evraz shares on the LSE. The non-executive members of the board subsequently resigned.

On 10 August 2022, Reuters reported that Evraz was seeking to sell its North American units. At the time, the Regina mill was reported to employ 1,200 people.

In September 2022 U.S. Steel and Nucor were reported to be interested in the North American assets. New York-based boutique advisory firm Three Keys Capital was named as the agent for the sale. As a result of the 2022 Russian invasion of Ukraine, Evraz was sanctioned and its shares delisted from the LSE.

== Operations ==
Evraz sets aside its coal business by the end of the year 2021 on the premise of all needed approvals, according to the group's report of the 1st half of 2021. In the very beginning of 2021 EVRAZ announced expecting to spin off its coal division consolidated in Raspadskaya. In April 2021, the group's board of directors approved the demerger of its coal assets to be shared pro rata among Evraz shareholders. In January 2022, Evraz shareholders also approved the demerger of the group's coal business, consolidated at PJSC "Raspadskaya" after the final decision made by the board of directors of Evraz last December.

The business structure is as follows:

=== Steel ===
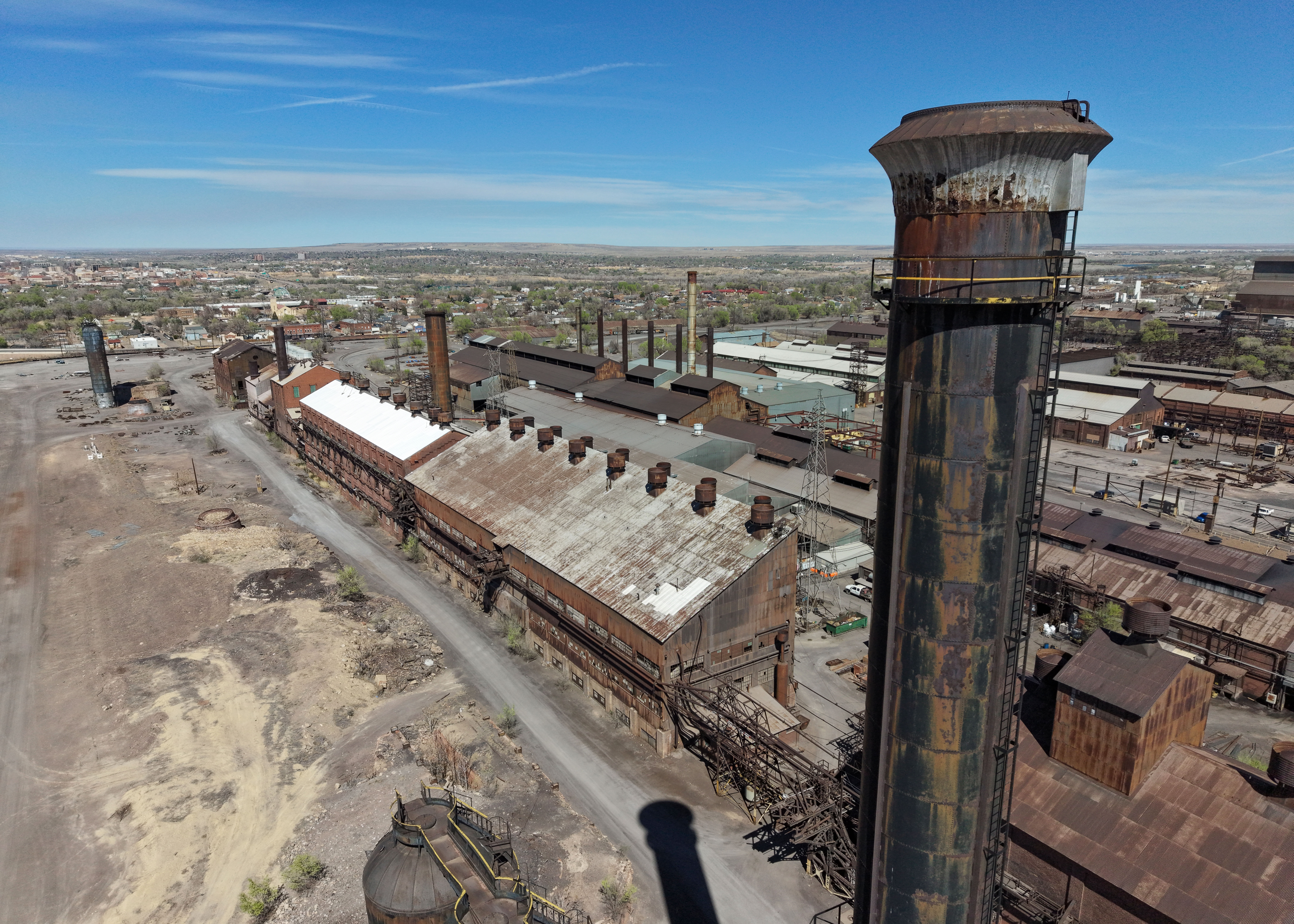
EVRAZ Rocky Mountain Steel Mill in Pueblo, Colorado

- Nizhny Tagil Iron and Steel Plant – NTMK – in Nizhny Tagil. Steel and vanadium slag
- Novokuznetsk Iron and Steel Plant – NKMK – in Novokuznetsk. Steel, specializing in railway steel (merged with EVRAZ ZSMK)
- EVRAZ Consolidated West-Siberian Metallurgical Plant (EVRAZ ZSMK) – steel producer. Merged with EVRAZ NKMK in 2011
- EVRAZ North America – Steel. Formed from merger of Oregon Steel Mills, Rocky Mountain Steel and IPSCO. The company is headquartered in Chicago, Ill. with manufacturing facilities in Portland, Oregon; Regina, Saskatchewan; Pueblo, Colorado; Calgary, Camrose and Red Deer, Alberta.

=== Ore ===
- Evrazruda mining and enrichment facilities in Kemerovo Oblast
  - In the Kemerovo Oblast: Tashtagol Mine, Kaz Mine, Sheregesh Mine, Gurev Mine, Abagur Sinter and Enrichment Plant
- Kachkanarsky Ore Mining and Processing Enterprise – Vanady – KGOK pit mining in Sverdlovsk region;
- Sukha Balka Mines, Kryvyi Rih, Ukraine.

=== Coal ===
- Yuzhkuzbassugol coking coal mining in the Kuzbass Region
- Raspadskaya/ coking coal company with three mines and one open pit in Mezhdurechensk, Kemerovo region, EVRAZ owns 82% of Raspadskaya

=== Vanadium ===
- EVRAZ Vanady Tula
- EVRAZ Nikom
- EVRAZ East Metals AG

=== Sales and logistics ===
- Metallenergofinance MEF, supplying electricity and heat for Evraz facilities
- Nakhodka Commercial Sea Port in the Russian Far East, handling most of Evraz' exports
- Trading House EvrazHolding/TH EvrazHolding working in domestic sales
- Trading House EvrazResource/TH EvrazResource working in domestic sales

=== Corporate structure ===
The company's interests in the majority of its subsidiaries are held indirectly through its ownership of Mastercroft. In June 2006, Evraz Group announced a transaction that resulted in the transfer to Greenleas International Holdings of a 50% interest in Lanebrook Ltd., an entity controlled by the principal shareholders of Evraz Group.

== Owners and management ==
As of April 2015, Lanebrook Ltd. held 63.70% of the company's shares, with the ultimate beneficial owners being Roman Abramovich (31.03%), chairman Alexander Abramov (21.59%) and CEO Aleksandr Frolov (10.78%).

At the end of 2021, Roman Abramovich owned 28.64%, Alexander Abramov — 19.32% and Aleksandr Frolov — 9.65%, Gennady Kozovoy — 5.74%, Evgeny Shvidler — 2.7%.

== See also ==
- List of steel producers
