= Novokuznetsk =

City in Kemerovo Oblast, Russia

Novokuznetsk Новокузнецк
- City
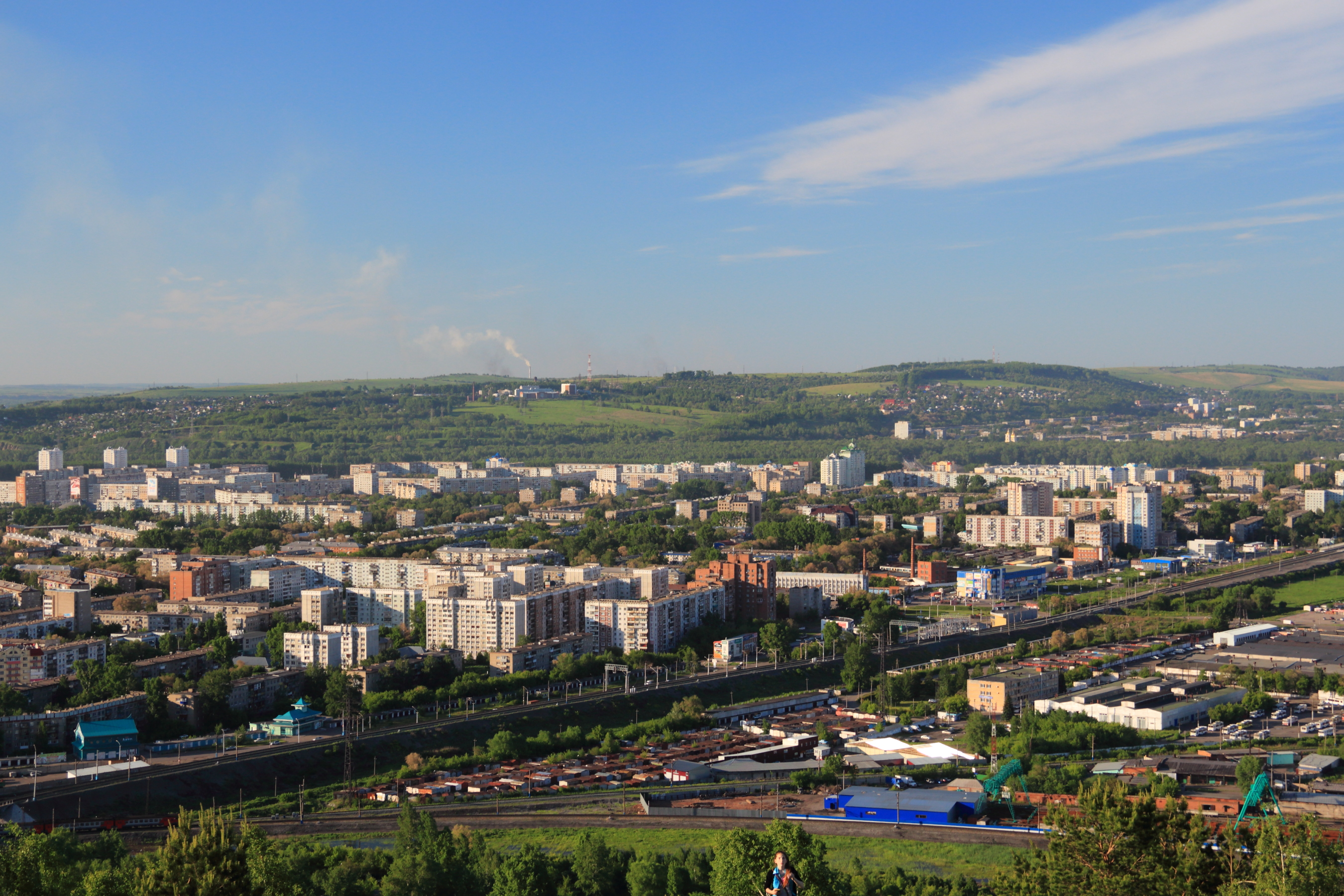
- View of Novokuznetsk

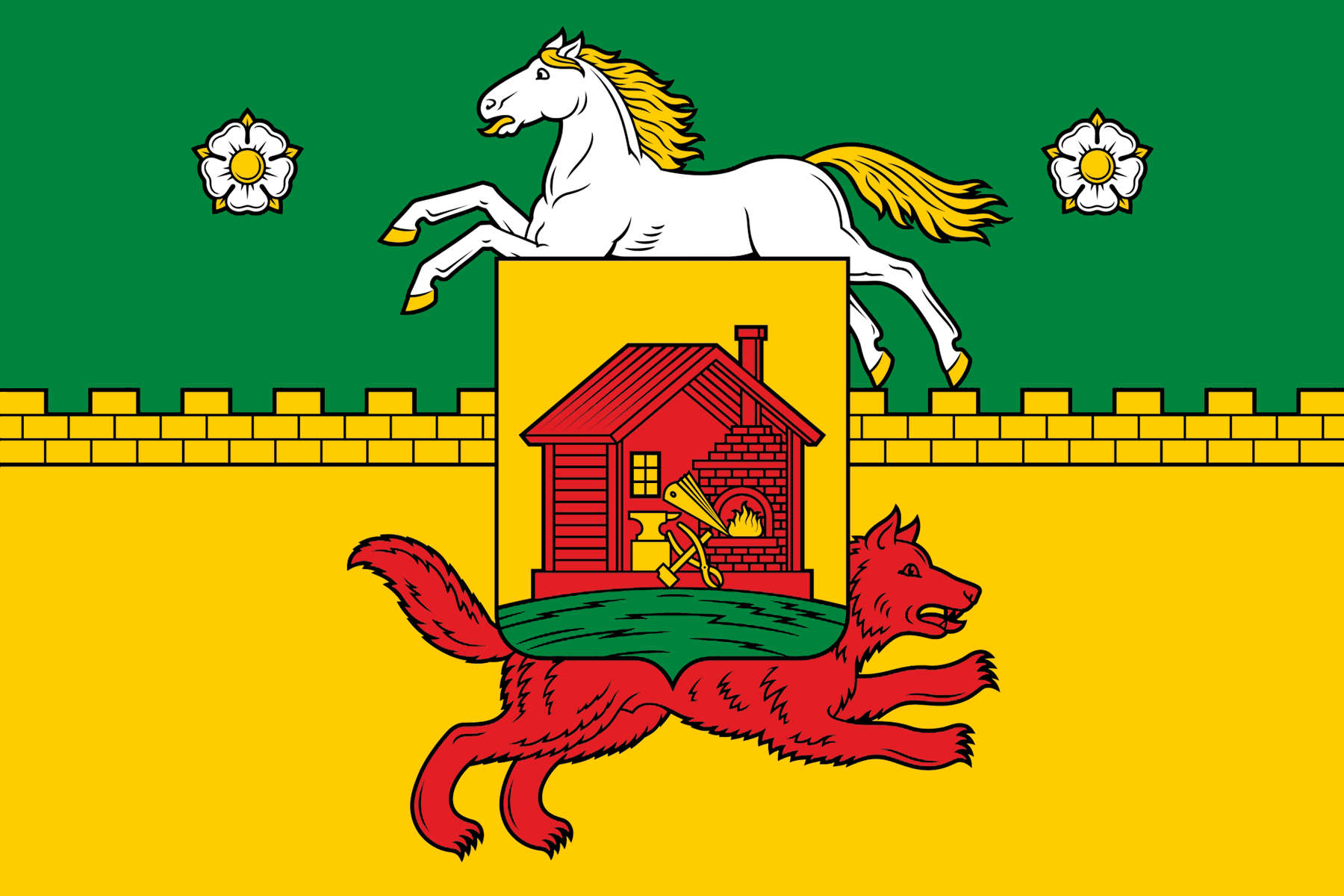
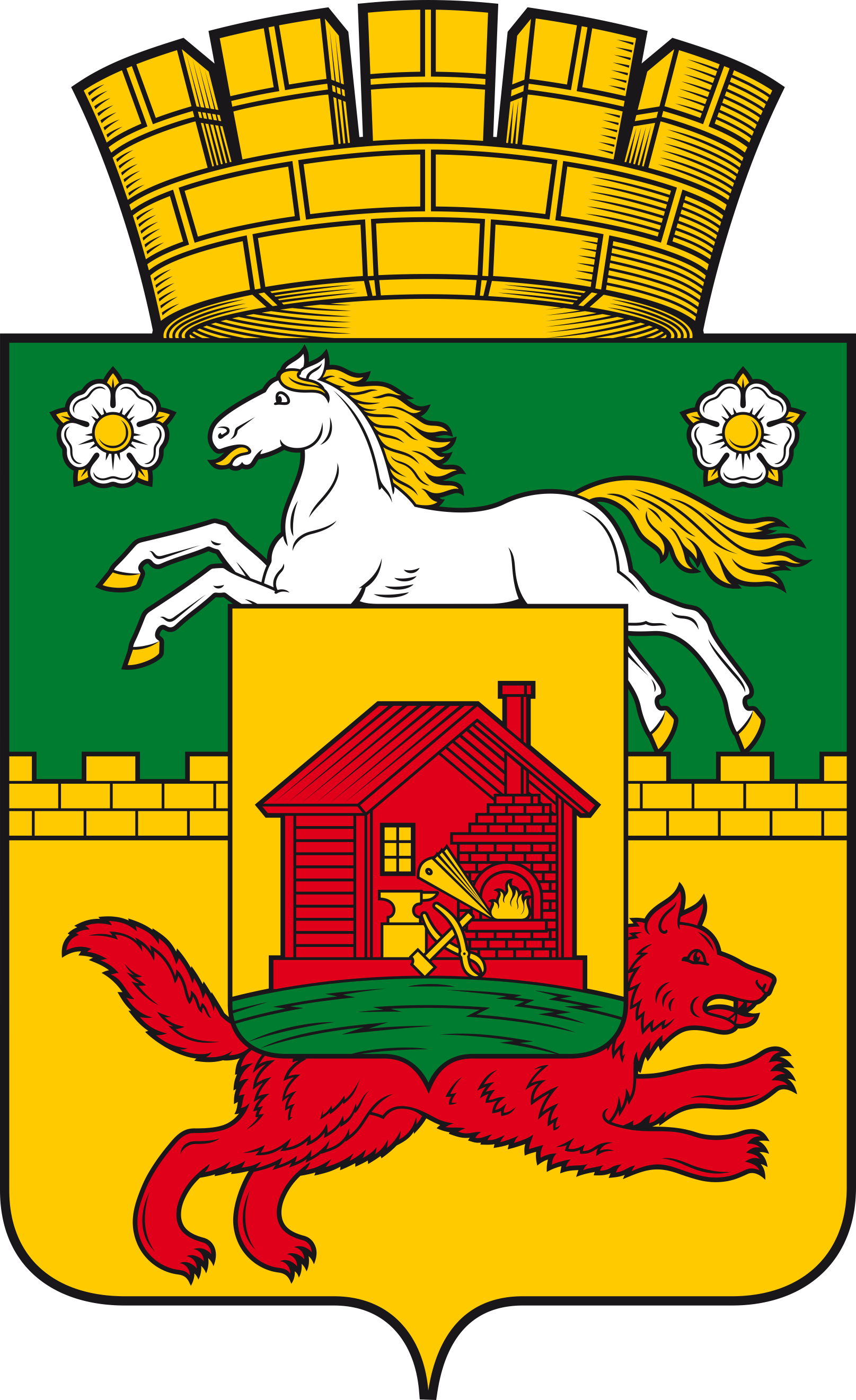
- Flag Coat of arms
- Interactive map of Novokuznetsk
- Location of Novokuznetsk Novokuznetsk (Kemerovo Oblast)
- Coordinates: 53°46′N 87°08′E
- Country: Russia
- Federal subject: Kemerovo Oblast
- Founded: 1618
- City status since: 1689

Government
  - Head: Denis Ilyin
- Elevation: 190 m (620 ft)

Population (2010 Census)
  - Total: 547,904
  - Estimate (2025): 528,747 (−3.5%)
  - Rank: 29th in 2010

Administrative status
  - Subordinated to: Novokuznetsk City Under Oblast Jurisdiction
  - Capital of: Novokuznetsky District, Novokuznetsk City Under Oblast Jurisdiction

Municipal status
  - Urban okrug: Novokuznetsky Urban Okrug
  - Capital of: Novokuznetsky Urban Okrug, Novokuznetsky Municipal District
- Time zone: UTC+7 (MSK+4)
- Postal code: 654000–654103
- Dialing code: +7 3843
- OKTMO ID: 32731000001
- Website: www.admnkz.info

Novokuznetsk (Russian: Новокузнецк, IPA: [nəvəkʊzˈnʲɛt͡sk], lit. 'new smith's'; Shor: Аба-тура, romanized: Aba-tura) is a city in Kemerovo Oblast (Kuzbass) in southwestern Siberia, Russia. It is the second-largest city in the oblast, after the administrative center Kemerovo.

It was previously known as Kuznetsk until 1932 and as Stalinsk until 1961.

== History ==
Founded in 1618 by men from Tomsk as a Cossack ostrog (fort) on the Tom River, it was initially called Kuznetsky ostrog (Кузне́цкий острог). It became the seat of Kuznetsky Uyezd in 1622. Kuznetsk (Кузне́цк) was granted town status in 1689. It was here that Fyodor Dostoevsky married his first wife, Maria Isayeva in 1857. Joseph Stalin's rapid industrialization of the Soviet Union transformed the sleepy town into a major coal mining and industrial center in the 1930s. It merged with Sad Gorod in 1931. From 1931 to 1932, the city was known as Novokuznetsk and between 1932 and 1961 as Stalinsk (Ста́линск), after Stalin. As a result of de-Stalinization, it was renamed back to Novokuznetsk.

== Demographics ==
As of the 2021 Census, the city's population stands at 537,480.

Historical population
Year	Pop.	±%
1897	3,141	—
1926	3,894	+24.0%
1939	166,000	+4163.0%
1959	377,000	+127.1%
1970	499,183	+32.4%
1979	541,356	+8.4%
1989	599,947	+10.8%
2002	549,870	−8.3%
2010	547,904	−0.4%
2021	537,480	−1.9%
Source: Census data

As of the 2021 Census, the ethnic composition of Novokuznetsk was:

Ethnic group	Population	Percentage
Russians	438,507	95.5%
Tajiks	3,450	0.8%
Tatars	2,533	0.6%
Other	14,919	3.2%

Other census data: 537,480 (2021 census); 547,904 (2010 census); 549,870 (2002 census); 599,947 (1989 Soviet census).

== City administration ==
=== Administrative and municipal status ===
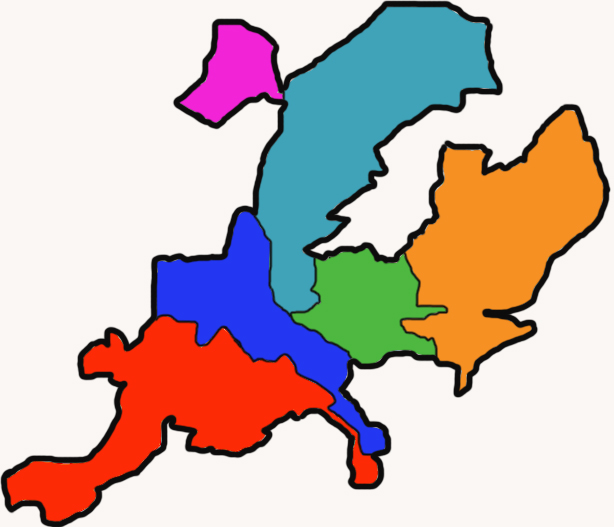

Within the framework of administrative divisions, Novokuznetsk serves as the administrative center of Novokuznetsky District, even though it is not a part of it. As an administrative division, it is incorporated separately as the Novokuznetsk City Under Oblast Jurisdiction—an administrative unit with the status equal to that of the districts. As a municipal division, Novokuznetsk City Under Oblast Jurisdiction is incorporated as the Novokuznetsky Urban Okrug.

The city consists of six non-municipal intra-city districts:

District	Area, km^{2}	Population (2021)
Zavodskoy District	109.10	92,620
Kuznetsky District	36.11	46,932
Kuibyshevsky District	92.49	75,174
Novoilyinsky District	22.49	77,593
Ordzhonikidzevsky District	95.62	78,533
Central District	66.52	166,628

=== Administrative bodies ===
On 7 December 2009, by a resolution of the Novokuznetsk City Council of People's Deputies, a new version of the City Charter was approved, according to which the authorities consist of:

- Novokuznetsk City Council of People's Deputies (representative authority),
- Mayors of the city of Novokuznetsk,
- Administration of the City of Novokuznetsk (executive and administrative authority),
- City Control Committee (permanent body of financial control),
- Judicial institutions: district courts, courts of general jurisdiction, the Russian Agency for Legal and Judicial Information, the permanent judicial presence of the Kemerovo Oblast Court, judicial divisions of magistrates, and others.

The Novokuznetsk City Council of People's Deputies is a representative body of power and consists of 18 deputies elected in 18 single-mandate constituencies and 18 deputies elected on party lists. The term of office of deputies is five years.

In September 2021, elections were held for the Council of People's Deputies, following which the seats in the council were distributed as follows: 27 - United Russia, 2 - Liberal Democratic Party, 2 - A Just Russia, 2 - Communist Party. The representative of United Russia, Alexandra Shelkovnikova, was elected chairman.

The Youth Parliament of the city operates under the City Council of People's Deputies.

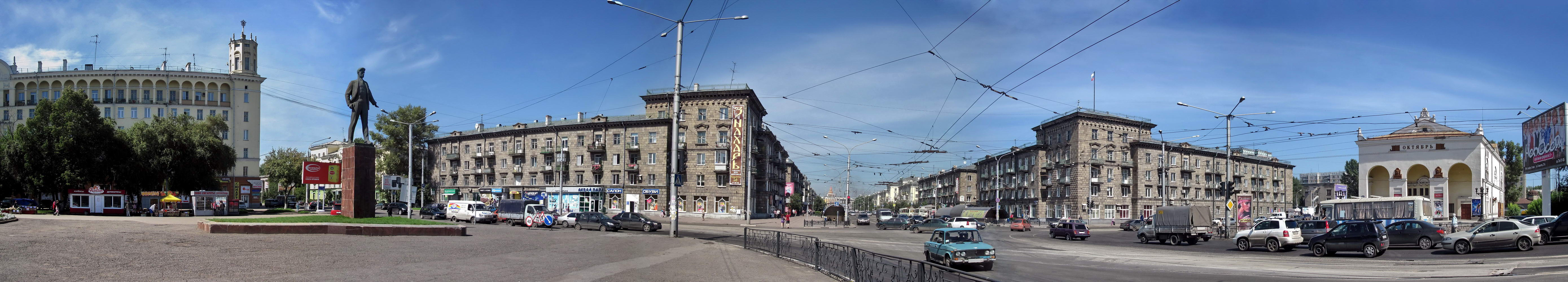
Crossroads of Metallurgists Avenue and Ordzhonikidze Street

A whole network of bodies of territorial public self-government has been created in Novokuznetsk; in total, 60 of them have been created in the city: in the Zavodskoy District - 7, Kuznetsky - 6, Kuibyshevsky - 13, Novoilyinsky - 6, Ordzhonikidzevsky - 9, Central - 16.

== Education ==
- Siberian State Industrial University
- Novokuznetsk branch of Kemerovo State University
- State Institute for Physicians Postgraduate Training (also known as Novokuznetsk Postgraduate Physician Institute), Russian Ministry of Health
- Novokuznetsk Scientific Center of Medicosocial Expert Evaluation and Rehabilitation of Invalids, Federal Agency for Public Health and Social welfare
- Institute of General Problems of Hygiene and Occupational Diseases, Russian Academy of Medical Sciences
- Seminary
- Kuzbass institute Federal Penitentiary Service

== Industry ==
Novokuznetsk is a heavily industrial city and is located in the heart of the Kuzbass region. Factories in the city include:

- West-Siberian Metal Plant
- Novokuznetsk Iron and Steel Plant
- Kuznetsk Ferroalloys
- Novokuznetsk aluminium factory

== Sports ==
Metallurg Novokuznetsk is an ice hockey team based in Novokuznetsk. Formerly a member of the Kontinental Hockey League, the team is currently a member of the Supreme Hockey League. The football team of the same name was recently promoted to the Russian first division below the premier.

RC Novokuznetsk compete in the Professional Rugby League, the highest division of rugby union in Russia.

Toronto Maple Leafs goaltender Sergei Bobrovsky, San Jose Sharks defenseman Dmitry Orlov and Minnesota Wild winger Kirill Kaprizov were all born in Novokuznetsk and began their pro careers with Metallurg Novokuznetsk.

Novokuznetsk is also the birthplace of US chess Grandmaster Gata Kamsky.

== Transportation ==
The main airport is the Spichenkovo Airport. The city is also a major railway junction with both local and long-distance trains. Local public transport is provided by trams, buses, and trolleybuses.

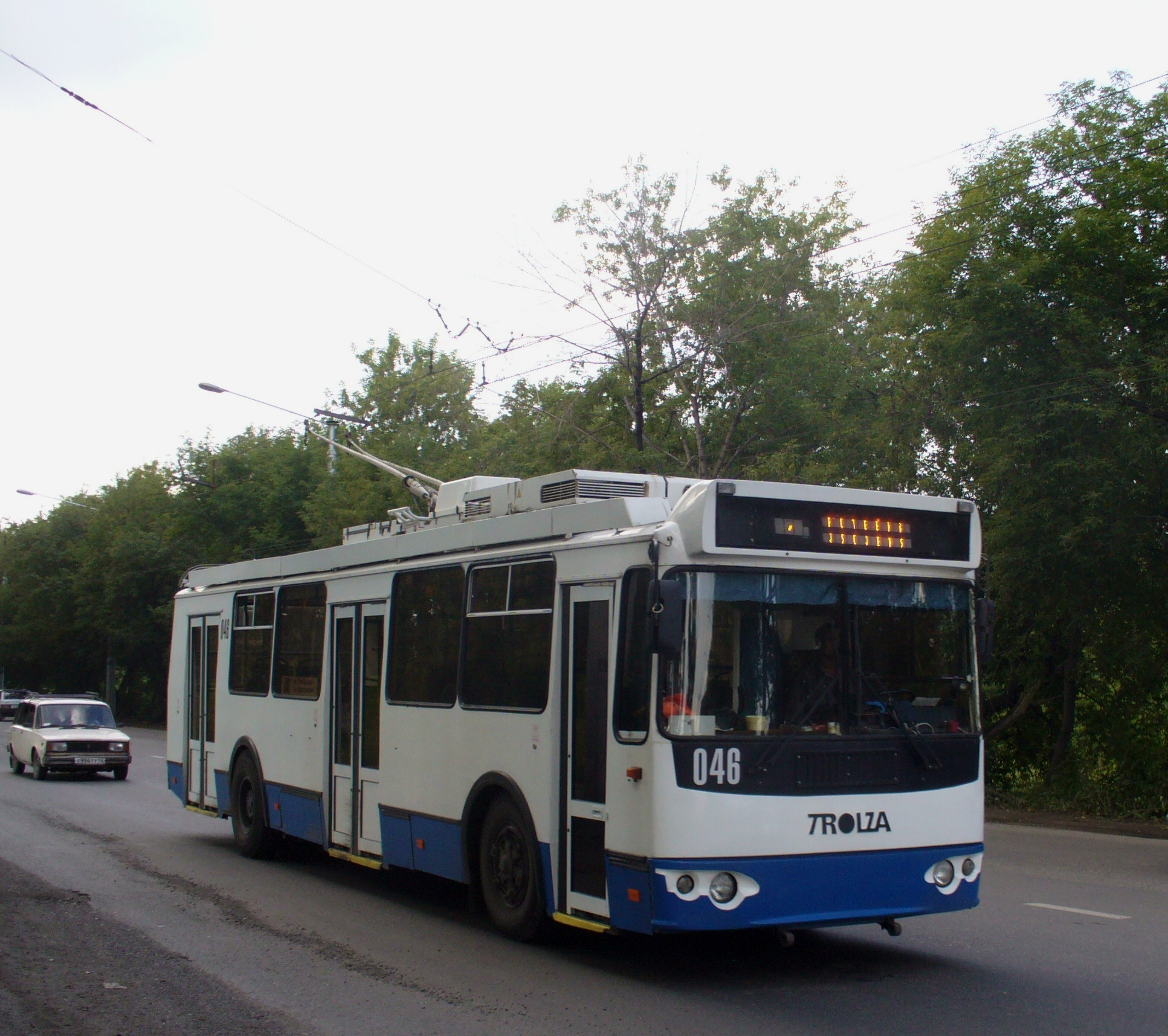
ZiU-682 trolleybus

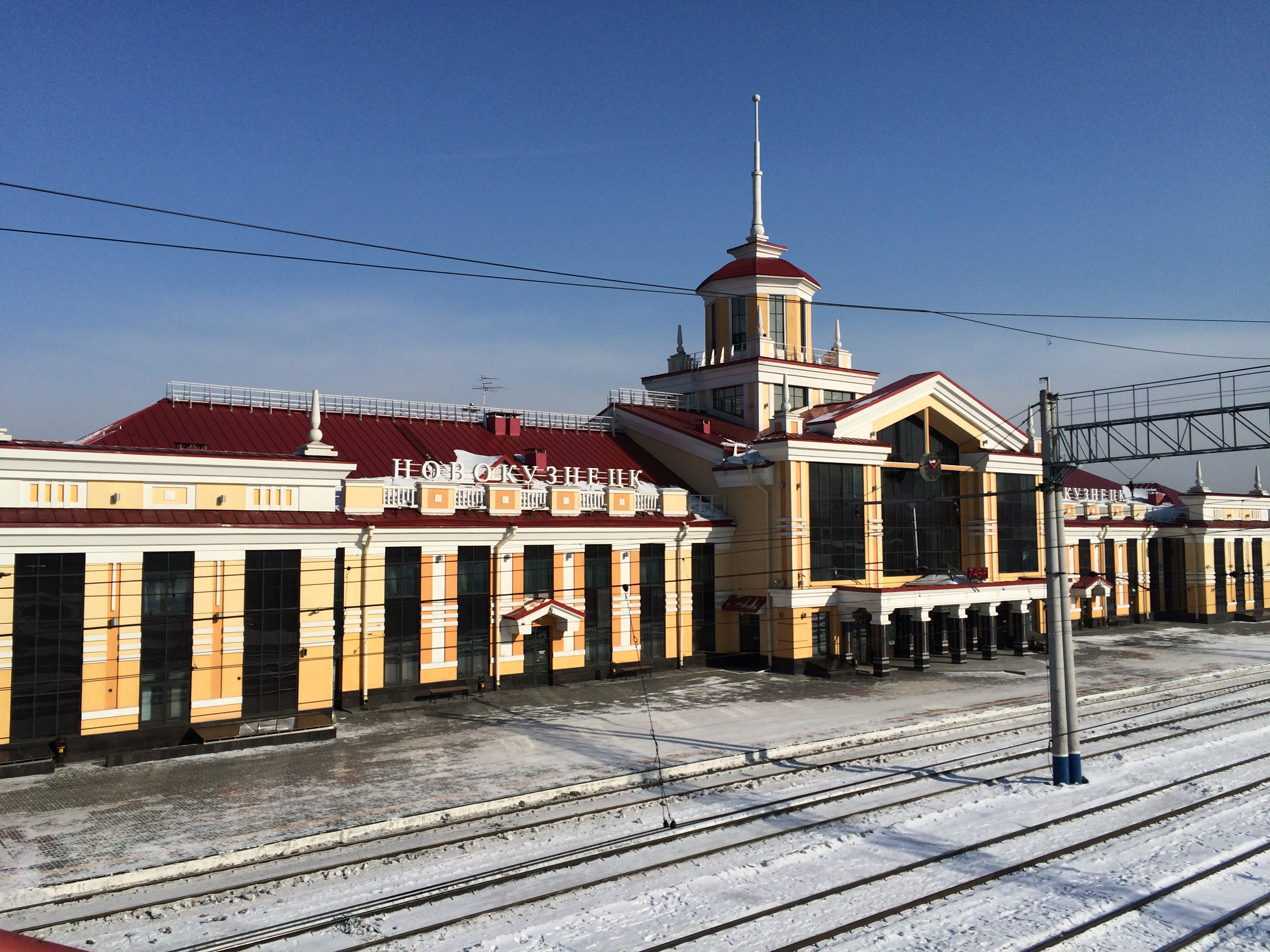
Novokuznetsk railway station renovated

== Climate ==
Novokuznetsk has a fairly typical southwest Siberian humid continental climate (Köppen climate classification: Dfb) with warm summers during which most of the precipitation occurs, and severe, generally dry winters. Snowfall is very frequent during the winter, but its water content is generally very low due to the cold temperatures.

Climate data for Novokuznetsk (1991–2020, extremes 1955–present)
Month	Jan	Feb	Mar	Apr	May	Jun	Jul	Aug	Sep	Oct	Nov	Dec	Year
Record high °C (°F)	4.2 (39.6)	7.9 (46.2)	18.3 (64.9)	30.6 (87.1)	34.8 (94.6)	36.7 (98.1)	36.0 (96.8)	35.9 (96.6)	34.7 (94.5)	24.9 (76.8)	17.4 (63.3)	7.3 (45.1)	36.7 (98.1)
Mean daily maximum °C (°F)	−10.9 (12.4)	−6 (21)	1.3 (34.3)	11.8 (53.2)	19.2 (66.6)	24.5 (76.1)	25.5 (77.9)	24.1 (75.4)	16.8 (62.2)	9.1 (48.4)	−2.5 (27.5)	−8.6 (16.5)	8.7 (47.7)
Daily mean °C (°F)	−15.9 (3.4)	−12.9 (8.8)	−5.2 (22.6)	4.2 (39.6)	11.5 (52.7)	17.0 (62.6)	19.0 (66.2)	16.5 (61.7)	9.9 (49.8)	3.0 (37.4)	−6.5 (20.3)	−13.2 (8.2)	2.3 (36.1)
Mean daily minimum °C (°F)	−20.5 (−4.9)	−18.2 (−0.8)	−10.9 (12.4)	−3.0 (26.6)	4.0 (39.2)	9.1 (48.4)	12.5 (54.5)	9.5 (49.1)	4.6 (40.3)	−1.7 (28.9)	−10.0 (14.0)	−17.5 (0.5)	−3.5 (25.7)
Record low °C (°F)	−47.7 (−53.9)	−42.2 (−44.0)	−33.9 (−29.0)	−26.1 (−15.0)	−8.9 (16.0)	−2.1 (28.2)	2.2 (36.0)	0.2 (32.4)	−6.7 (19.9)	−23.0 (−9.4)	−37.7 (−35.9)	−42.8 (−45.0)	−47.7 (−53.9)
Average precipitation mm (inches)	25 (1.0)	17 (0.7)	19 (0.7)	28 (1.1)	43 (1.7)	56 (2.2)	73 (2.9)	62 (2.4)	42 (1.7)	38 (1.5)	40 (1.6)	31 (1.2)	474 (18.7)
Average rainy days	0.4	0	2	9	15	16	16	15	14	11	4	1	103
Average snowy days	20	18	15	11	3	0.1	0	0	1	11	19	23	121
Average relative humidity (%)	81	78	74	66	60	68	73	75	75	77	82	82	74
Source: Pogoda.ru.net

== Twin towns and sister cities ==
Novokuznetsk is twinned with:

- Nizhny Tagil, Russia
- Banbury, United Kingdom

== Notable people ==
- Sergei Abramov (born 1956), ice hockey player
- Sergei Bobrovsky (born 1988), ice hockey player
- Margarita Chernousova (born 1996), a sport shooter
- Maksim Chevelev (born 1990), professional football player
- Evgeny Chigishev (born 1979), a former weightlifter and Olympic silver medalist
- Andrey Dementyev (born 1970), a former professional football player
- Kirill Kaprizov (born 1997), ice hockey player
- Maxim Kitsyn (born 1991), a professional ice hockey player
- Ana Kriégel, Russian-born Irish murder victim
- Anna Litvinova (1983–2013), a fashion model and beauty pageant title holder
- Aleksandr Melikhov (born 1998), a professional football player
- Kostyantyn Milyayev (born 1987), a Ukrainian Olympic platform diver
- Vadim Mitryakov (born 1991), a professional ice hockey player
- Nikita Morgunov (born 1975), a former professional basketball player
- Albert Nasibulin (born 1972), a material scientist
- Dmitry Orlov (born 1991), ice hockey player
- Maksim Pichugin (born 1974), a Winter Olympic cross-country skier
- Anton Rekhtin (born 1989), a professional ice hockey player
- Artyom Sapozhkov (born 1990), a former professional football player
- Stanislav Sel'skiy (born 1991), a rugby union player
- Denis Simplikevich (born 1991), a rugby union player
- Kirill Skachkov (born 1987), an Olympic table tennis player
- Denis Stasyuk (born 1985), ice hockey player
- Daniil Tarasov (born 1999), ice hockey player
- Ivan Telegin (born 1992), ice hockey player and Winter Olympic gold medalist
- Arkady Vainshtein (born 1942), a Russian-American theoretical physicist
- Vladimir Vilisov (born 1976), a Winter Olympic cross-country skier
- Maxim Zyuzyakin (born 1991), a professional ice hockey player
- Pavel Silyagin (born 1993), professional boxer

== Gallery ==
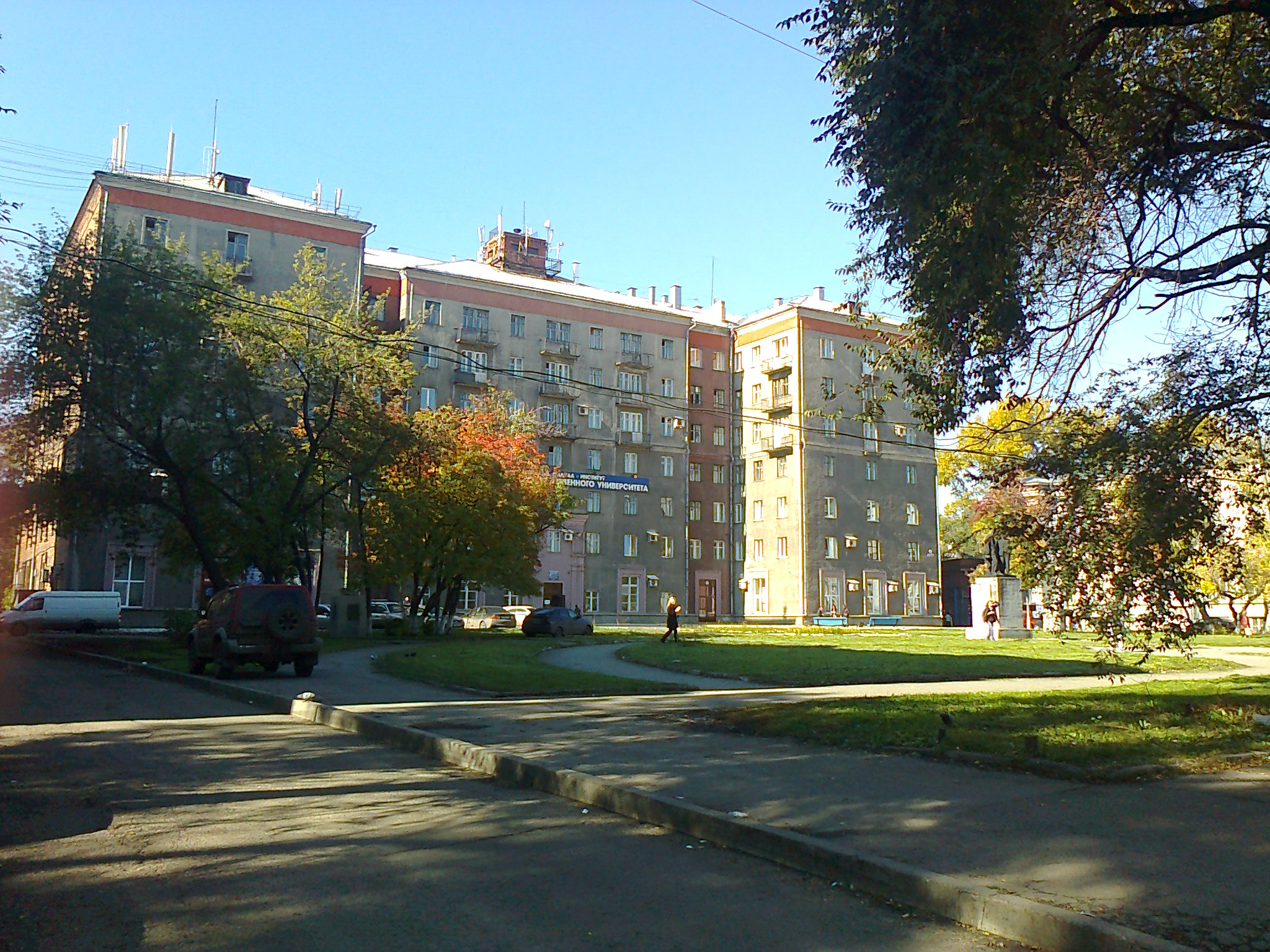
Novokuznesk branch of Kemerovo State University

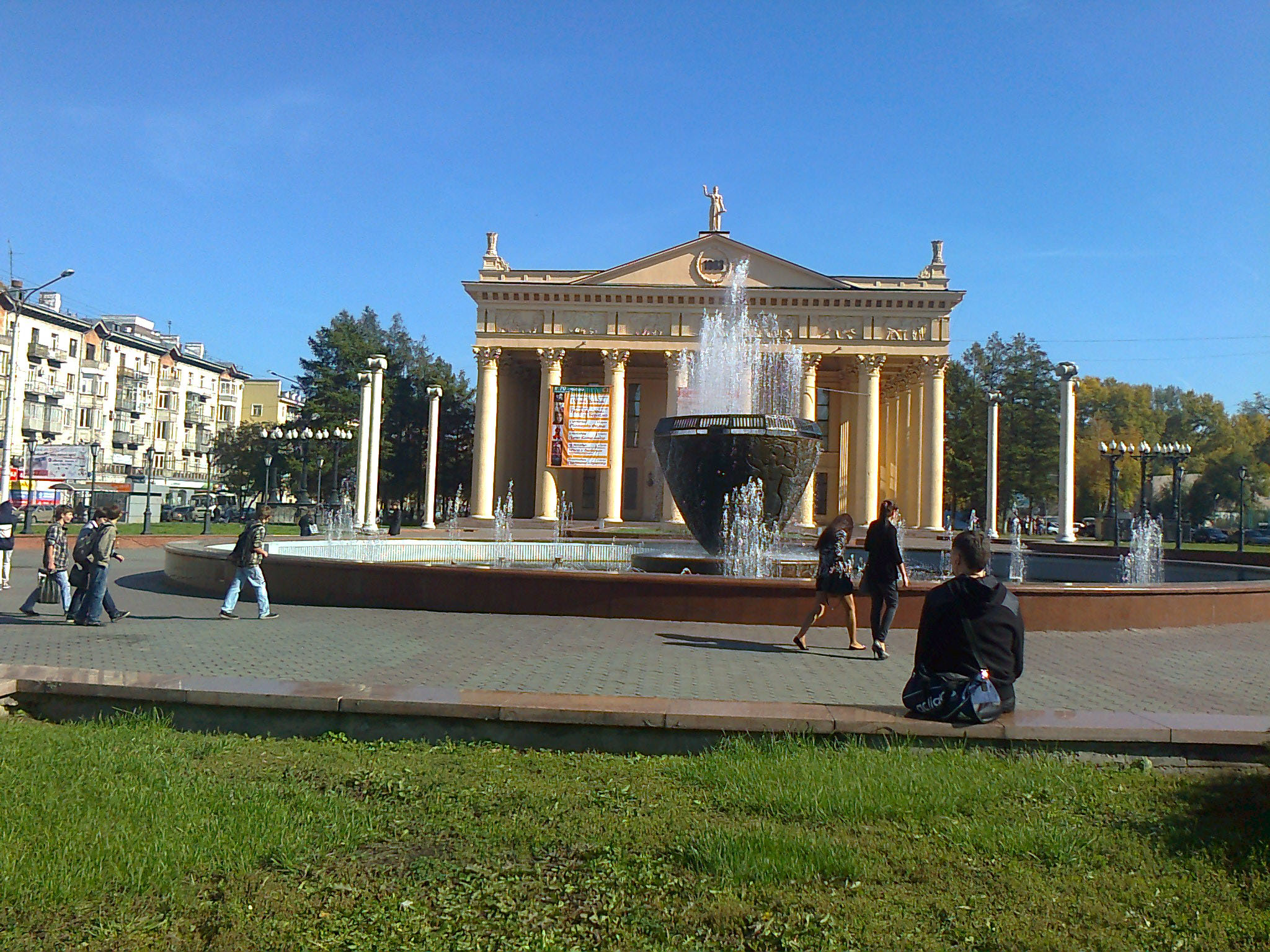
Teatralnaya Square

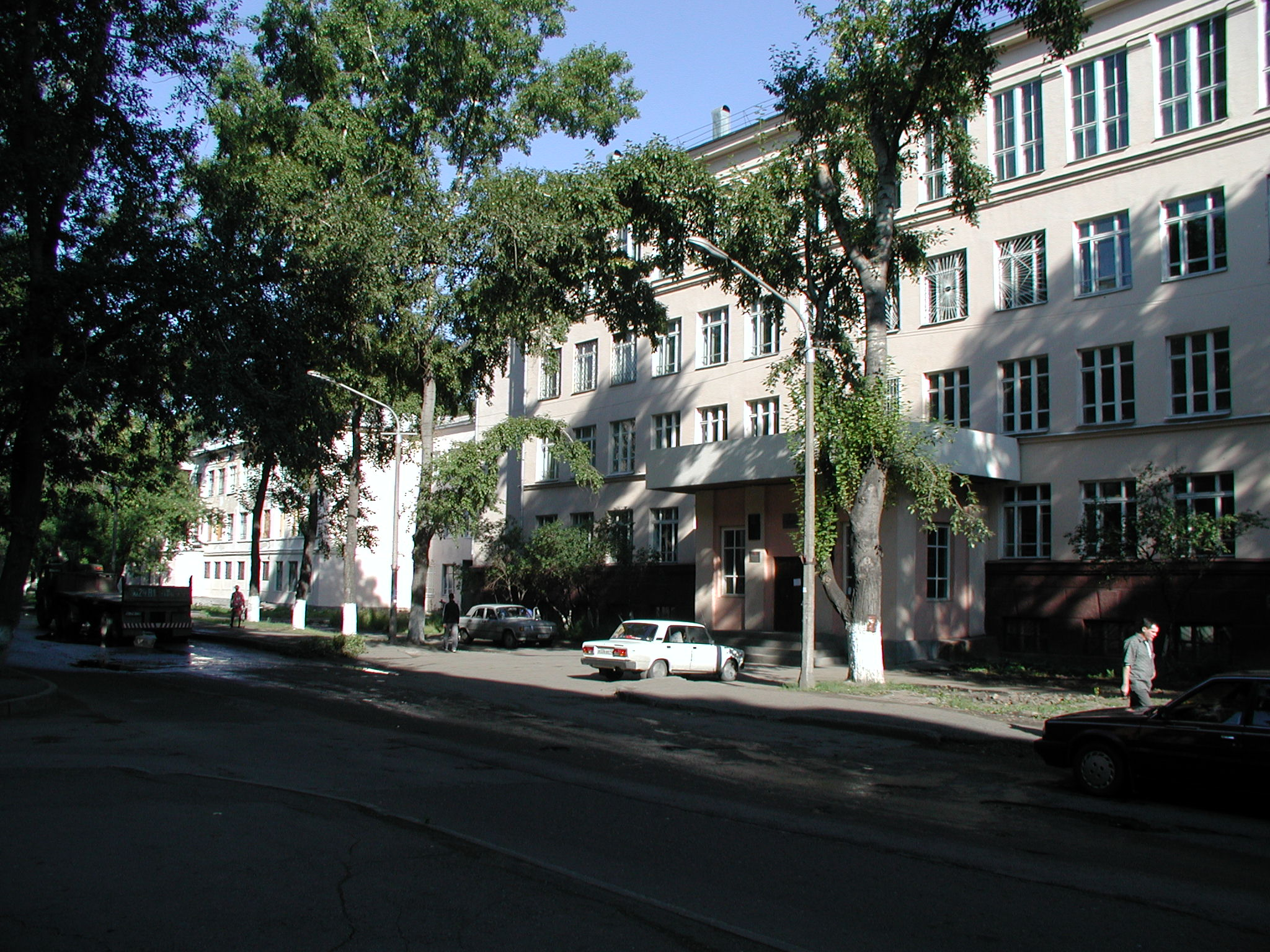
Kuzbass State Pedagogical Academy

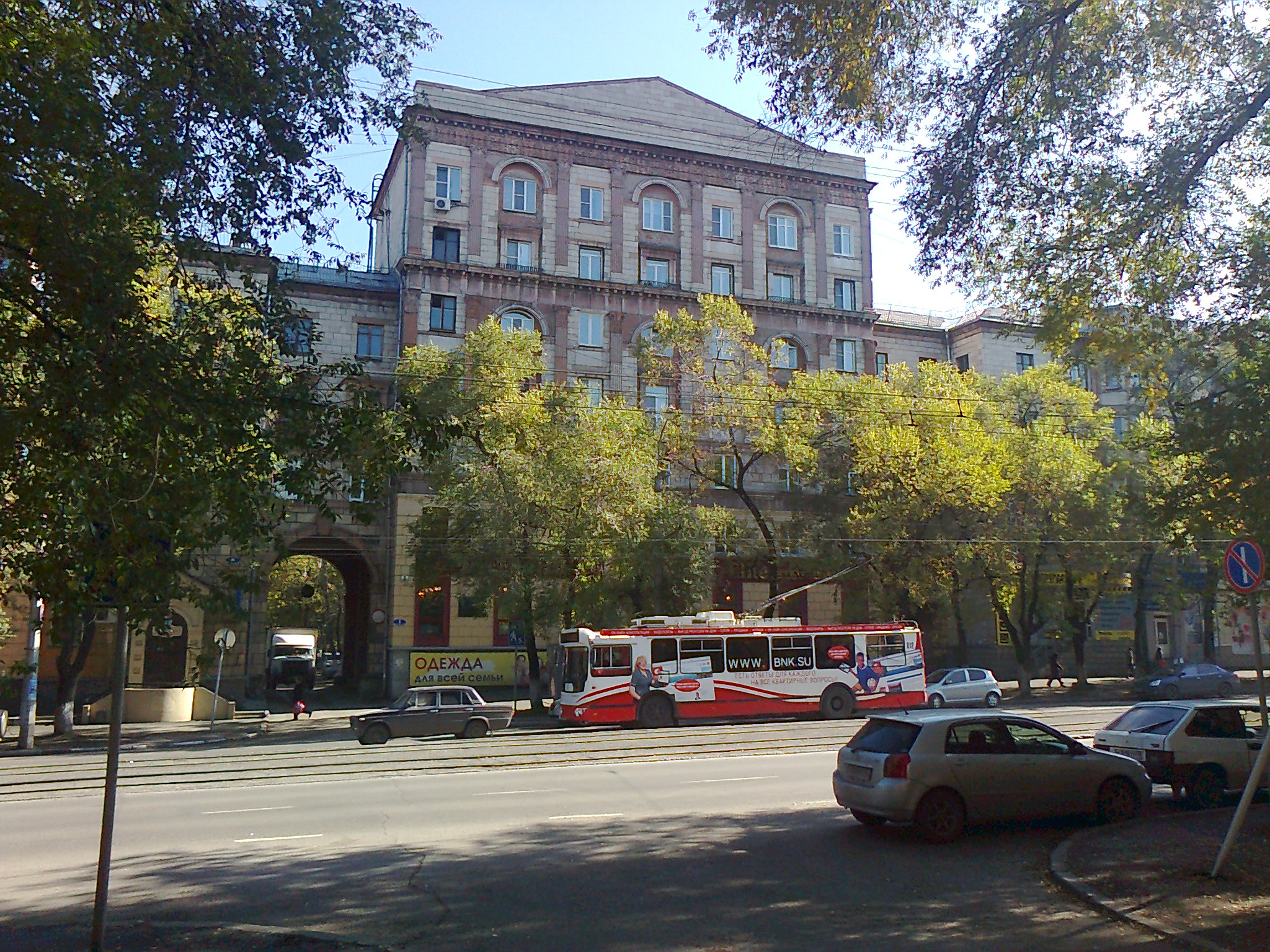
Metallurgov Avenue, 6

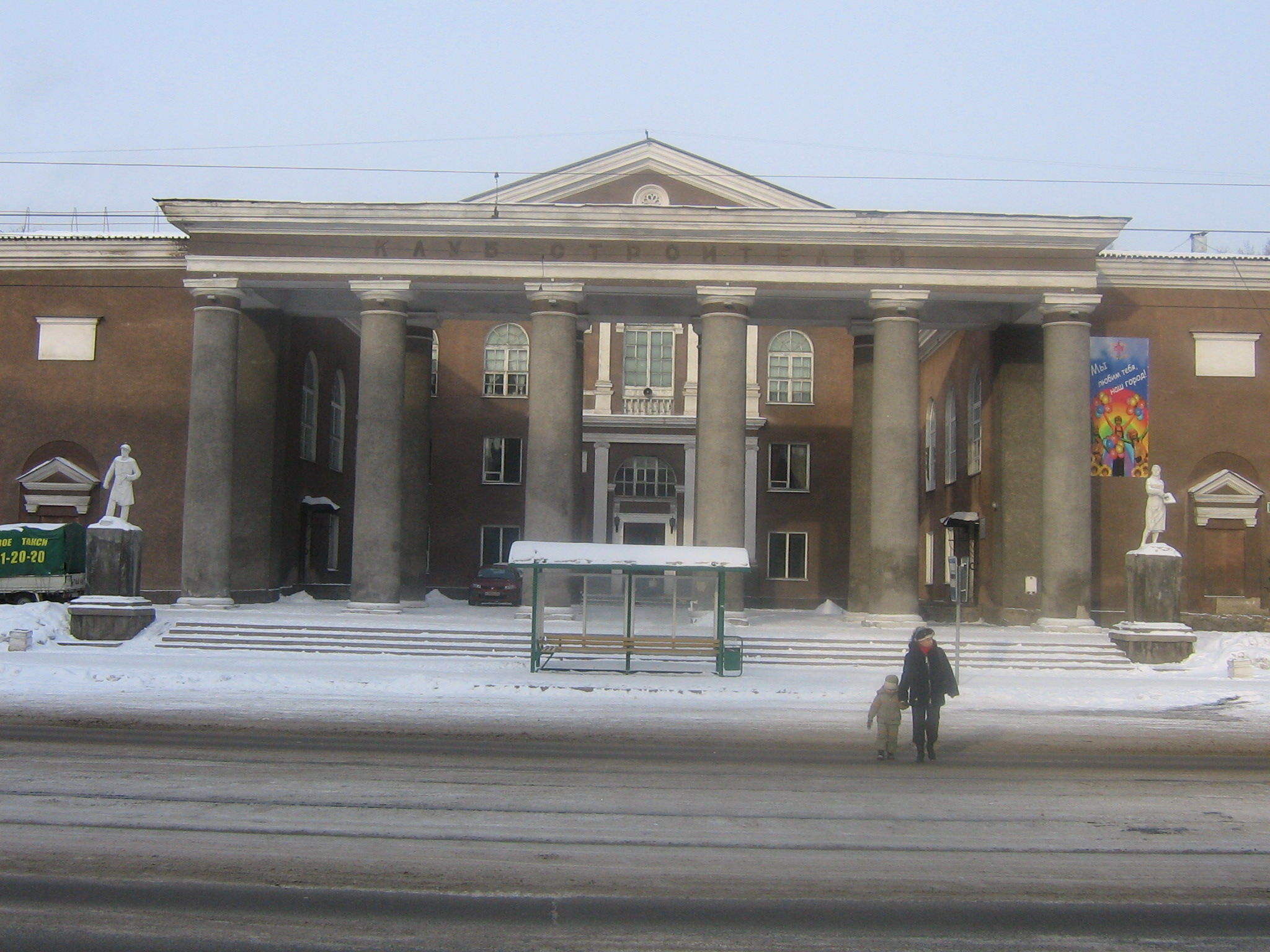
Constructors Palace of Culture

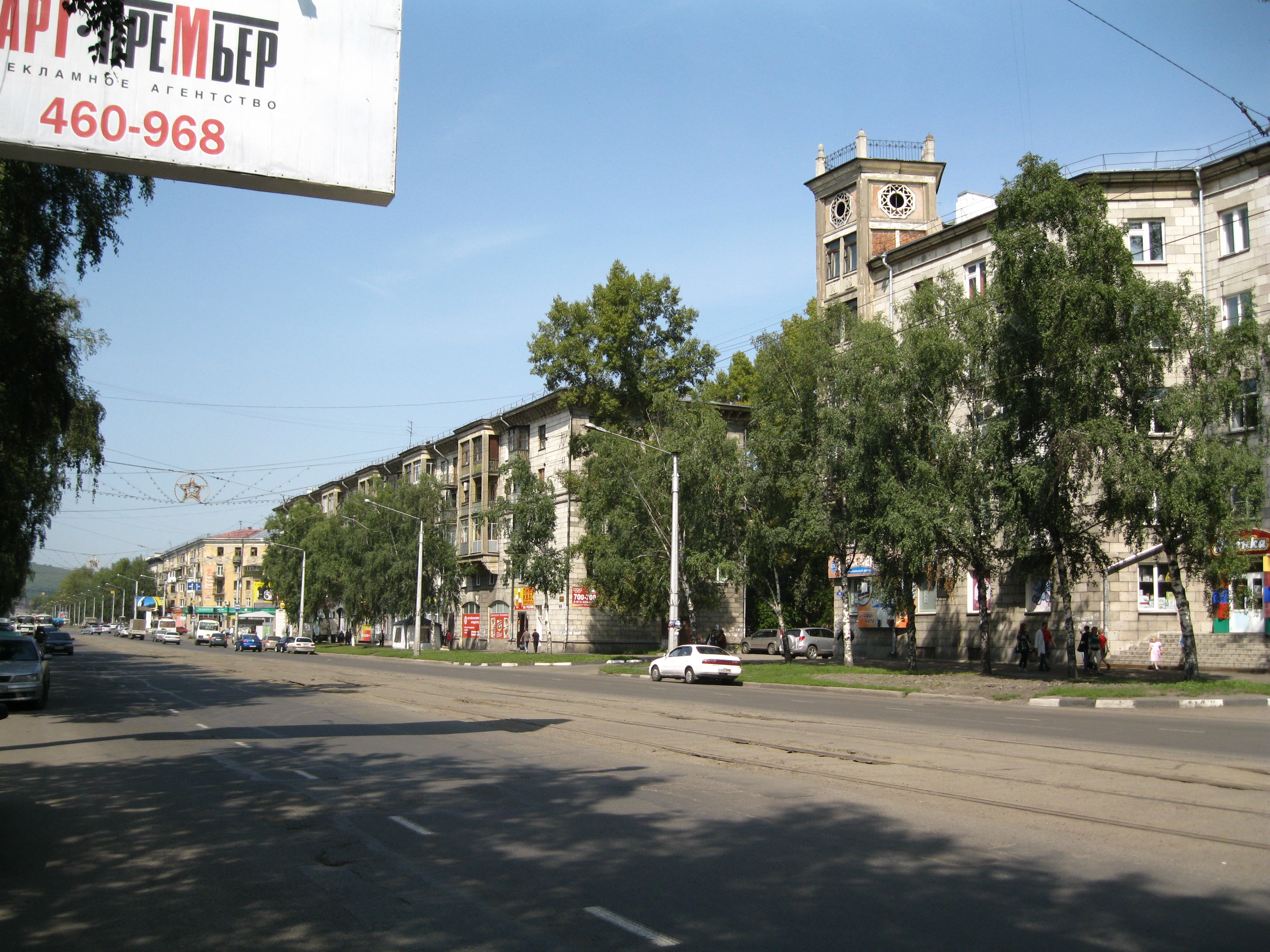
Kurako Avenue
