= Alexander Abramov =

Russian billionaire businessman

- Александр Абрамов
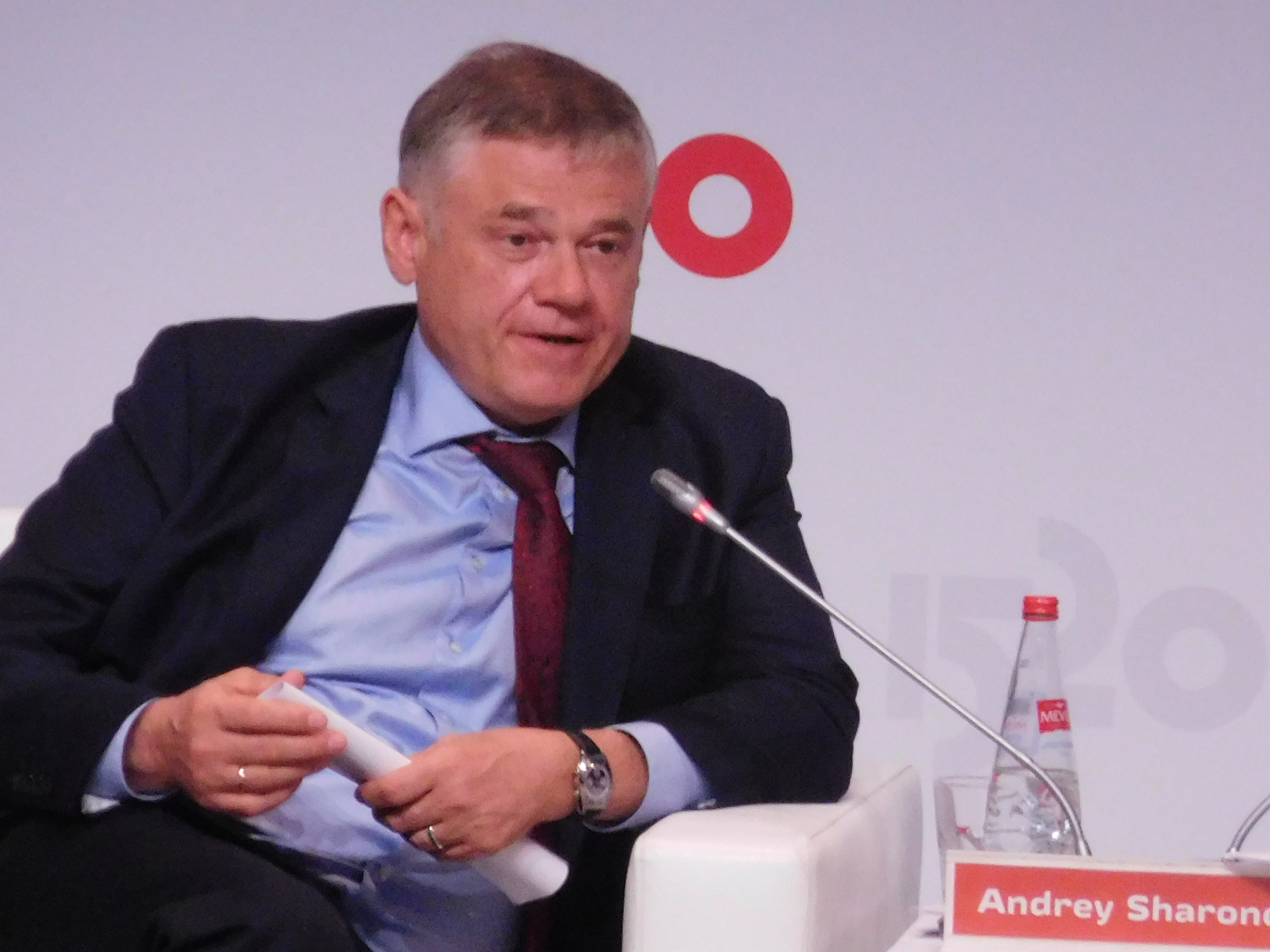
- Abramov in 2017
- Born: Alexander Grigoryevich Abramov; February 20, 1959 (age 67); Moscow, USSR
- Education: Moscow Institute of Physics and Technology
- Occupation: Businessman
- Known for: Co-founder and chairman, Evraz
- Spouse: Married
- Children: 3
- Awards: Order of Friendship

Alexander Grigoryevich Abramov (Russian: Александр Григорьевич Абрамов, born 20 February 1959) is a Russian businessperson, who until March 2022 was the chairman of the board of directors of Evraz, one of Russia's largest steel producers. Since 1998, he has amassed one of the largest steel and iron empires in Russia, which employed 71,591 people around the world, with steel output of 13,57 million tones and turnover of $14,1 billion in 2021, leading to him be widely considered a Russian oligarch. A business partner and ally of Aleksandr Frolov and Roman Abramovich, Abramov was in June 2021 listed by Forbes as having an estimated net worth of $8.0 billion.

== Early life and education ==
Abramov was born in 1959 in Moscow, Russia, USSR. He is of Jewish descent. He graduated from the Moscow Institute of Physics and Technology with a degree in physics and mathematics. He first worked for Russia's space and defense program before becoming a metal trader after government funding declined.

== Career ==
EVRAZ is a product of Russia's growth since the 1998 financial crisis and Abramov is representative of the second wave of Russian magnates who went into business after the best assets had been taken. Unlike the first wave of politically connected oligarchs, such as Mikhail Khodorkovsky and Vladimir Potanin, Abramov had neither political leverage nor financial resources to help him benefit from Russia's chaotic privatisation of the 1990s.

In the 2000s, Evraz-Holding has emerged as one of the most aggressive vertically integrated business groups in Russia and worldwide. Its assets now include ore mines and steel mills in Russia, steel mills in North America and Kazakhstan, as well as Russian coal company PJSC Raspadskaya.

In June 2005, EvrazHolding was listed on the London Stock Exchange. Five months later, Abramov resigned as group president but remains a member of the board. In 2019, Abramov alongside other directors, sold $160m worth of shares in the company. He resigned from the board of EVRAZ plc in March 2022.

== Entrepreneurship ==
=== Trading ===
He used his contacts with Russia's steel mills, which used high-temperature technologies, and offered his services not as a scientist but as a metal trader. Trading was a popular and quick way to make money in Russia in the early 1990s. The economy was shrinking, non-payment was a chronic problem and any offer of cash from a trader was welcomed by factories. By 1997, trading was less profitable and many trading companies, including Abramov's, were owed large sums by producers. Abramov began buying factories and swapped debt for equity in the Nizhny Tagil steel mill, while also buying stakes in its rail-producing plant from other shareholders.

=== Acquisitions, monopolies and factories ===
While the first wave of Russian oligarchs grabbed whatever assets they could, Mr Abramov acquired them in a much more focused way. He decided to build a monopoly for rail and steel construction products and looked for factories that would give him synergies. The only other big factories making these products were in the industrial region of Kemerovo, also home to Russia's largest coalmines. Using his old trading contacts with coalmine bosses, Abramov was introduced to Aman Tuleev, populist governor of the region.

=== Pitching job creation in the vacuum of bankrupt factories ===
The two factories Abramov was interested in were in bankruptcy in 1998. Salaries had not been paid for up to eight months and strikes were breaking out.

==== The deal: managers for factories ====
Tuleev needed good managers. Abramov needed the two factories and soon a deal was made.

As a state creditor, Tuleev would help appoint external managers loyal to EvrazHolding to run the steel mills. Abramov would pay salaries and taxes, guarantee jobs and support Tuleev's social projects.

==== Acquisitions ====
In 2007, EVRAZ acquired Oregon Steel Mills and Claymont Steel.

== Sanctions ==
Abramov is named in the Countering America's Adversaries Through Sanctions Act released by US Treasury in January 2018.

He was sanctioned by the UK government in 2022 in relation to the Russo-Ukrainian War.

== Personal life ==
He is married with three children, and lives outside of Russia. His hobbies include fishing, swimming, tennis.
