= Nizhniy Tagil Iron and Steel Works =

Russian steel manufacturer

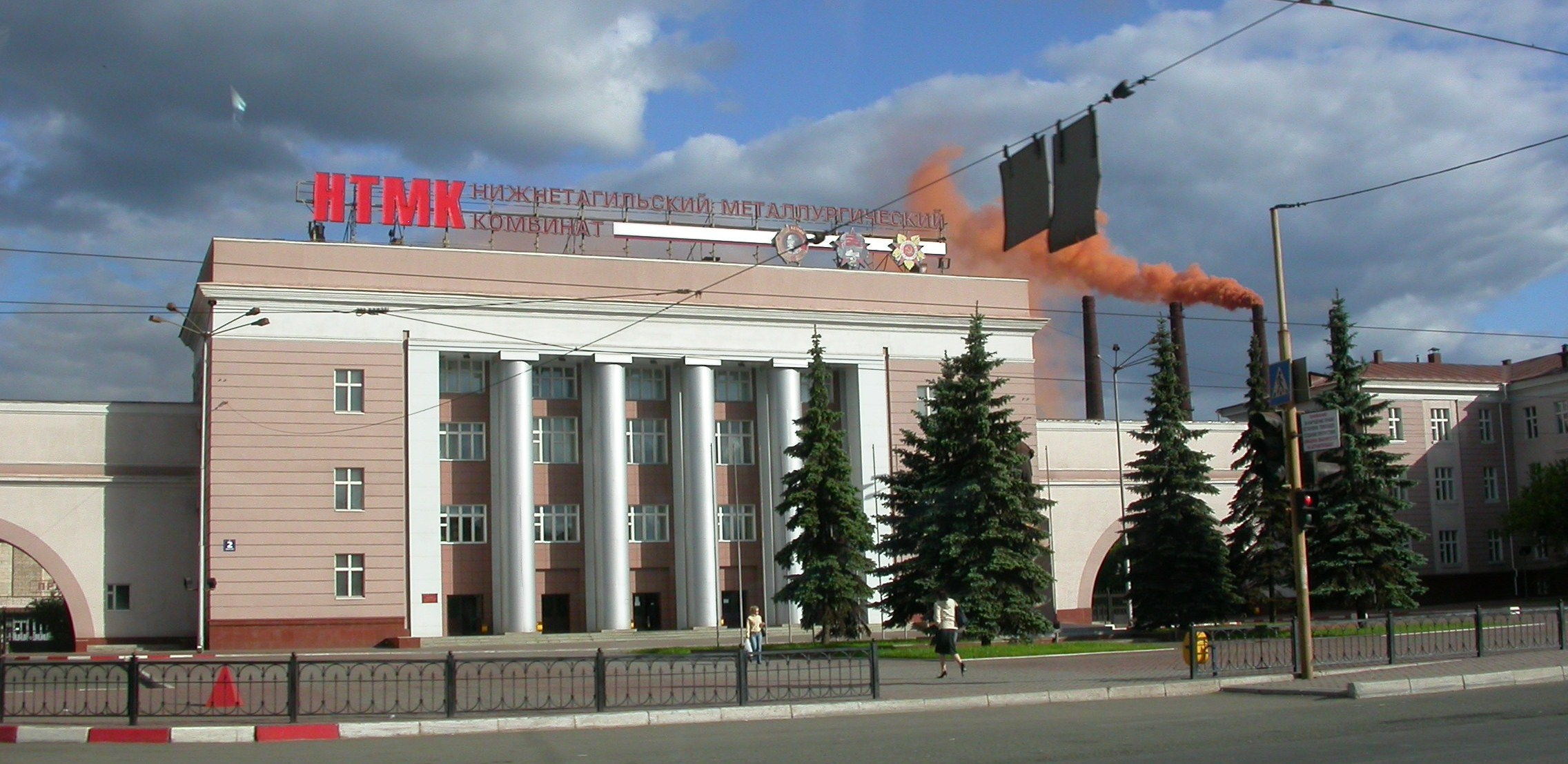
- Native name: Нижнетагильский металлургический комбинат
- Company type: Public
- Industry: Steel
- Founded: 1992
- Headquarters: Nizhniy Tagil
- Key people: Alexey V. Kushnarev, Managing Director; Andrey V. Larin, Financial Director
- Products: Steel; Rolling stock Vanadium steel
- Revenue: ~
- Number of employees: ~
- Website: www.ntmk.ru/en

OJSC Nizhniy Tagil Iron and Steel Works (Russian: ОАО «Нижнетагильский металлургический комбинат», Nizhnetagilsky Metallurgichecky Kombinat) is a Russian steel manufacturer. It is part of the Evraz Group. Its name is abbreviated as NTMK (Russian: НТМК) or Nikom and NTMK is listed in RTS Index.

== History ==
The company is located in the Ural Mountains, in the city of Nizhniy Tagil, in Sverdlovsk Oblast. The city has been a steel-making center for centuries, and the company's website boasts a long historical association with the industry. Large-scale steel manufacture began in 1725, at the end of the reign of Peter the Great. At this time in the town's history, half of the output was exported to England.

In 1992, NTMK underwent privatization and was organized into a joint-stock company.

== Operational details ==
The city is convenient to the Yekaterinburg - Perm railway and through the Kama River to the Volga River.

The orestock in the Nizhniy Tagil region is vanadium-rich. The company has pioneered the blast oxygen process of steelmaking and according to its website, it has the world's largest H-beam manufacturing facility.

NTMK specializes in manufacturing rolling stock, train wheels and train rails.
