= Ryazan Plant for Manufacturing and Processing Non-Ferrous Metals =

Russian manufacturer of lead and lead alloys

CJSC Ryazan Plant for Manufacturing and Processing Non-Ferrous Metals (Ryaztsvetmet)
- Industry: Metals, Smelting
- Founded: 1953
- Headquarters: Ryazan, Russia
- Products: pure lead (99.97% and 99.985%), antimony and tin based lead alloys, lead powder and feathered tin, solder alloys, Babbitts, lead pipes and goods (anodes & wires), crushed polypropylene
- Website: www.rzcm.ru

Ryazan Plant for Manufacturing and Processing Non-Ferrous Metals (Ryaztsvetmet; Russian: ЗАО «Рязцветмет») is Russia’s chief manufacturer of lead and lead alloys. In 2009 the plant underwent a full-scale modernization, including the assembling of the modern automatic equipment. This allowed increasing the production and at the same time dramatically decreasing ecological risks: the emission has been reduced by three times, electrical energy consumption – by 3.8 times.

== Production ==
Ryaztsvetmet produces pure lead (99.97% and 99.985%) and antimony and tin based lead alloys, as well as custom-made lead alloys with alloying additions.

Ryaztsvetmet offers a selection of lead powder and feathered tin, solder alloys, Babbitts, lead pipes and goods (anodes & wires)

The plant also sells crushed polypropylene (from discarded automotive batteries).

== Shipment ==
The products are supplied to manufacturers of accumulator batteries all over the world.

A significant part of the production is sold in the domestic market and used for manufacturing automotive batteries.
