= Sergei Abramov (ice hockey, born 1956) =

Russian ice hockey player (1956–2019)

- Born: July 10, 1956; Novokuznetsk, Russia
- Died: May 23, 2019 (aged 62)
- Height: 5 ft 10 in (178 cm)
- Weight: 198 lb (90 kg; 14 st 2 lb)
- Position: Forward
- Shot: Left
- Played for: HC Izhstal
- NHL draft: Undrafted
- Playing career: 1980–1992

Sergei Abramov (born July 10, 1956) is a Russian former professional ice hockey player who played 165 games in the Soviet Championship League for HC Izhstal. He is currently the head coach of HC Izhstal of the Russian Higher Hockey League.

== Career statistics ==
			Regular season					Playoffs
Season	Team	League	GP	G	A	Pts	PIM	GP	G	A	Pts	PIM
1972–73	Metallurg Novokuznetsk	Soviet2	17	5	1	6	0	—	—	—	—	—
1973–74	Metallurg Novokuznetsk	Soviet2	33	13	6	19	8	—	—	—	—	—
1974–75	Metallurg Novokuznetsk	Soviet2	31	10	9	19	2	—	—	—	—	—
1975–76	Metallurg Novokuznetsk	Soviet3	—	39	—	—	—	—	—	—	—	—
1976–77	Metallurg Novokuznetsk	Soviet3	—	36	—	—	—	—	—	—	—	—
1977–78	Metallurg Novokuznetsk	Soviet3	—	57	—	—	—	—	—	—	—	—
1978–79	SKA Novosibirsk	Soviet3	44	40	34	74	22	—	—	—	—	—
1979–80	SKA Novosibirsk	Soviet2	34	29	26	55	4	—	—	—	—	—
1979–80	Metallurg Novokuznetsk	Soviet3	22	18	7	25	6	—	—	—	—	—
1979–80	Izhstal Izhevsk	Soviet	9	0	1	1	0	—	—	—	—	—
1980–81	Izhstal Izhevsk	Soviet2	60	50	50	100	20	—	—	—	—	—
1981–82	Izhstal Izhevsk	Soviet	44	12	21	33	12	13	5	14	19	4
1982–83	Izhstal Izhevsk	Soviet	42	15	8	23	12	16	8	3	11	6
1983–84	Izhstal Izhevsk	Soviet	44	10	14	24	16	—	—	—	—	—
1984–85	Ishstal Ustinov	Soviet	20	11	13	24	8	28	15	28	43	—
1985–86	Izhstal Ustinov	Soviet	22	14	17	31	12	10	0	2	2	4
1986–87	Izhstal Ustinov	Soviet2	59	37	44	81	26	—	—	—	—	—
1987–88	Izhstal Izhevsk	Soviet	25	15	8	23	12	35	13	21	34	16
1988–89	Izhstal Izhevsk	Soviet2	66	26	42	68	26	—	—	—	—	—
1989–90	Izhstal Izhevsk	Soviet2	52	22	24	46	10	—	—	—	—	—
1990–91	Izhstal Izhevsk	Soviet2	50	17	27	44	10	—	—	—	—	—
1991–92	Izhstal Izhevsk	Soviet2	42	13	13	26	6	—	—	—	—	—
1992–93	Izhstal Izhevsk	Russia2	—	—	—	—	—	—	—	—	—	—
1993–94	Progress Glazov	Russia2	38	9	16	25	16	—	—	—	—	—
1994–85	Progress Glazov	Russia2	—	—	—	—	—	—	—	—	—	—
Soviet totals			206	77	82	159	72	102	41	68	109	30
