= Oregon Steel Mills =

American steel producer

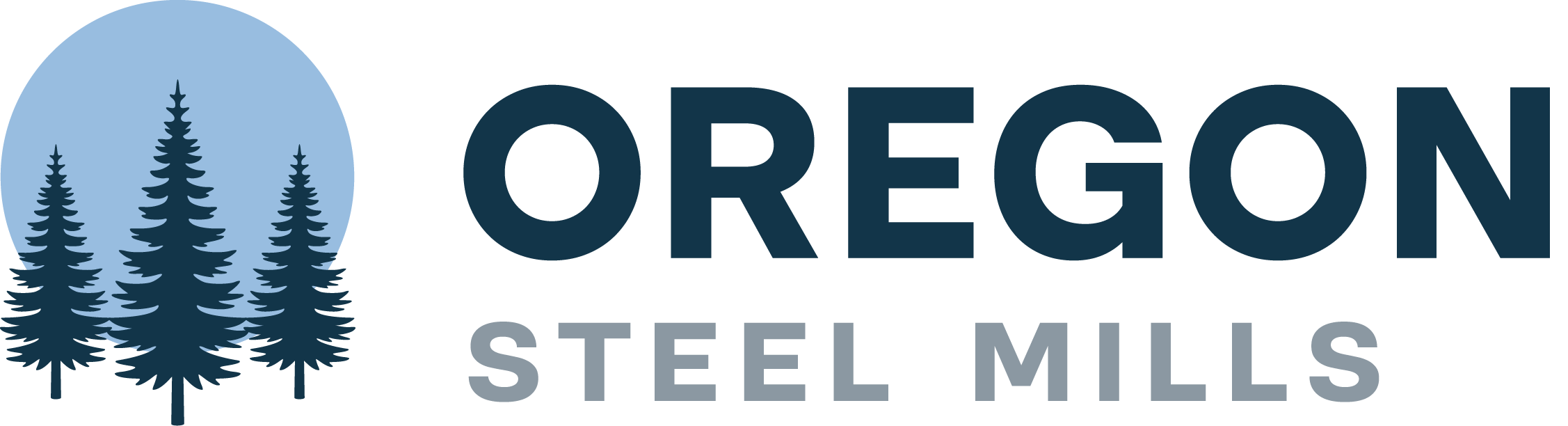
- Type: Subsidiary
- Industry: Steel industry
- Founded: 1926: Launched as Gilmore Steel; 1987: became Oregon Steel; 2007: Oregon Steel Mills became Evraz Oregon Steel Mills; 2025: Evraz Oregon Steel Mills became part of Orion Steel Companies
- Founder: William G. Gilmore
- Headquarters: Portland, Oregon, U.S.
- Key people: James E. Declusin, President & CEO
- Products: rails, structural tubing, pipes
- Revenue: $1,258 million
- Net income: ▲$ 110 million (FY 2005)
- Owner: Atlas Holdings
- Number of employees: 2,000 (2006)
- Parent: Orion Steel Companies
- Website: www.oregonsteelmills.com
- Footnotes; Financial data

Oregon Steel Mills (OSM), a subsidiary of Orion Steel Companies, is an American steelmaker owned by Atlas Holdings. The company was founded in 1926 in Portland, Oregon, United States. The company produces plate and coil products, including ballistic grade steel armor.

== History ==
Oregon Steel began as Gilmore Steel in 1926 when William G. Gilmore started the company.

Thomas Boklund became president of Gilmore Steel in 1982, CEO in 1985, and chairman of the board in 1992. In 1987, the company became Oregon Steel Mills (OSM). It went public in 1988 (trading on the NYSE as OS), launching a series of acquisitions. In 1993, OSM purchased Colorado Fuel and Iron.

In January 2007, the company was acquired by Evraz, a Russian steel producer, for $2.3 billion. In February 2010, Jim Declusin stepped down as CEO of Evraz Oregon Steel Mills after 4 years in office. In January 2011, the company announced moving its headquarters from Portland to Chicago.

In April 2020, Evraz Oregon Steel Mills stopped operating its Portland spiral pipe mill, leading to 230 permanent job cuts, following a downturn in the gas and oil industry amid the COVID-19 pandemic. 65 more workers were laid off in June 2020 at its North Portland mill. This pipe mill had closed in 2009 and reopened in 2012 following the nation's boost in natural gas and oil drilling production. The facilities in Oregon were using steel slabs imported from Russia, but importing steel from Russia became much more expensive due to tariffs imposed during the Trump administration.

Evraz was the largest carbon emitter of the city of Portland as of 2021.

As a result of sanctions placed against it as a result of the 2022 Russian invasion of Ukraine, Evraz announced its intention to sell its North American assets.

On July 31, 2025, Atlas Holdings acquired the North American operations and reorganized them under a new company called Orion Steel.

== Operations ==
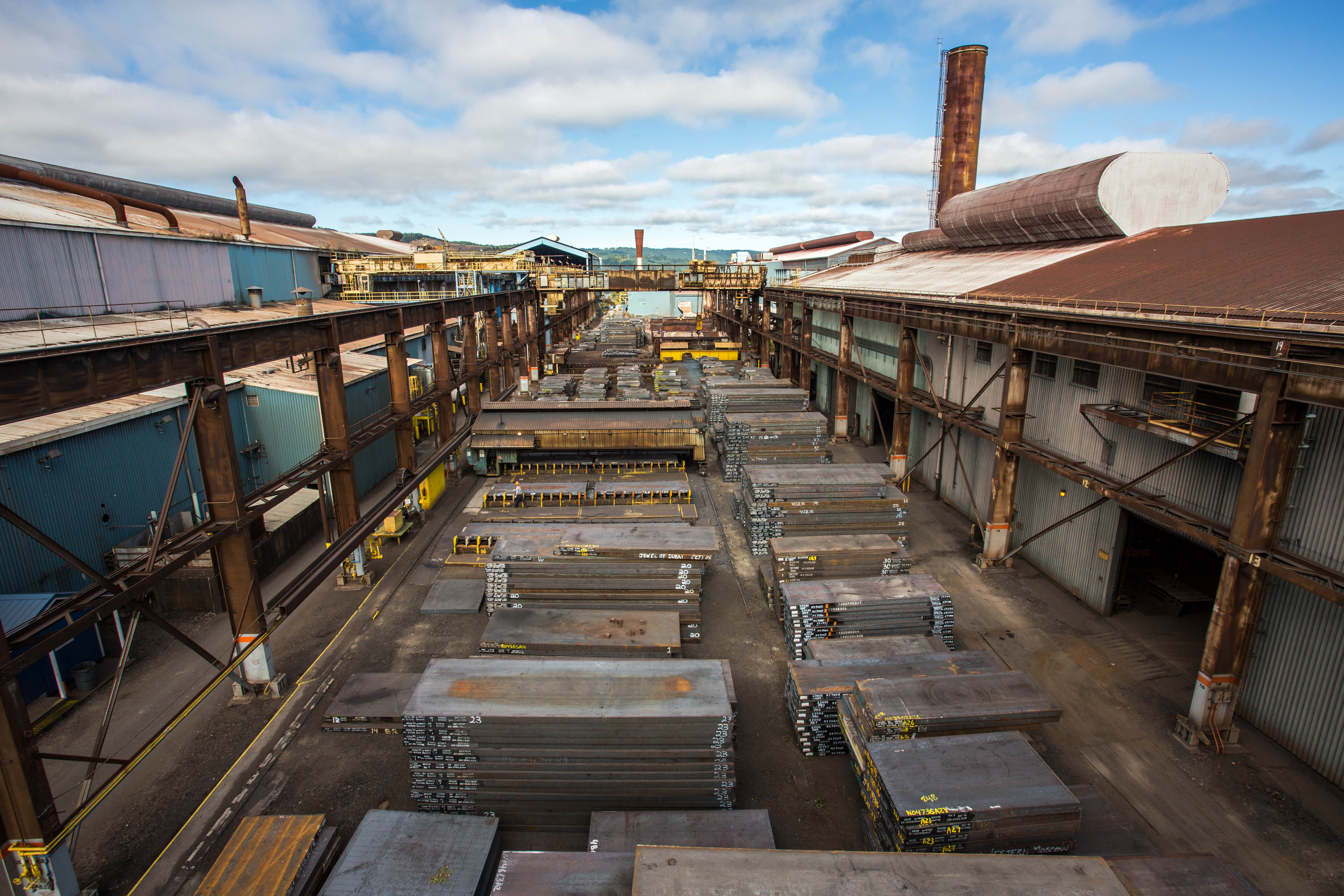
The interior of the steel mill in Portland

The company operates a variety of steel production facilities. These include a plate mill at their OSM Rolling Mill at the Portland Steelworks in Portland, Oregon. OSM manufactures armor plating for the U.S. military. Also at the Portland Steelworks is OSM Tubular that makes pipes for use in areas such as oil and natural gas transmission, this plant was closed in 2015. In Oregon, OSM also operates a structural tubing facility, the only producer in the Northwest, this plant was sold in 2015.
