= Aleksandr Frolov (businessman) =

Russian businessman

- Born: 17 May 1964 (age 62)
- Occupation: CEO of Evraz (2007-2021)
- Website: www.evraz.com

Aleksandr Vladimirovich Frolov (Russian: Александр Владимирович Фролов) (born 17 May 1964) was the CEO of Evraz in 2007-2021, one of the largest steel producers. Since 2013, the company's coal subsidiaries, consolidated under PJSC Raspadskaya in 2020, made it the largest Russian producer of coking coal.

== Career ==
Frolov graduated with honors from the Department of Molecular and Chemical Physics of the Moscow Institute of Physics and Technology in 1987. He received his Ph.D. in physics and mathematics from the same institute in 1991. Frolov worked at the Kurchatov Institute of Atomic Energy in Moscow. In 1994 he became an entrepreneur. From 2007 till September 2021 he was the CEO of Evraz (LSE: EVR). Frolov's partner, Alexander Abramov, was the Chairman of EVRAZ. Both of them resigned from EVRAZ Board of directors in March 2022.

=== Sanctions ===
He was sanctioned by the UK government in 2022 in relation to the Russo-Ukrainian War.

== Net worth ==
According to Forbes list of billionaires, he has a net worth of $2.6 billion as of August 2022. He ranks 1341st on Forbes' List of Billionaires in 2022.

== Personal life ==
Frolov is married and has one child.

== See also ==
- Evraz Group
- Alexander Abramov
