= West-Siberian Metal Plant =

Coordinates: 53.884°N 87.261°E

West-Siberian Metal Plant (Russian: Западно-Сибирский металлургический комбинат) is a metal plant in the city of Novokuznetsk in Kemerovo Oblast in southwestern Siberia, founded on 27 July 1964. The West-Siberian Metallurgical Plant is owned and operated by Evraz. The company's name is abbreviated to ZSMK (Russian:ЗСМК). It is one of the largest smelters in the Siberian region and the fifth-largest metallurgical plant in Russia. ZSMK's products are sold in over 30 countries.

In 2016, over 5.4 million tons of pig iron and over 6.9 million tons of steel were produced by the Metallurgical Plant.
