= Sayan intermontane steppe =

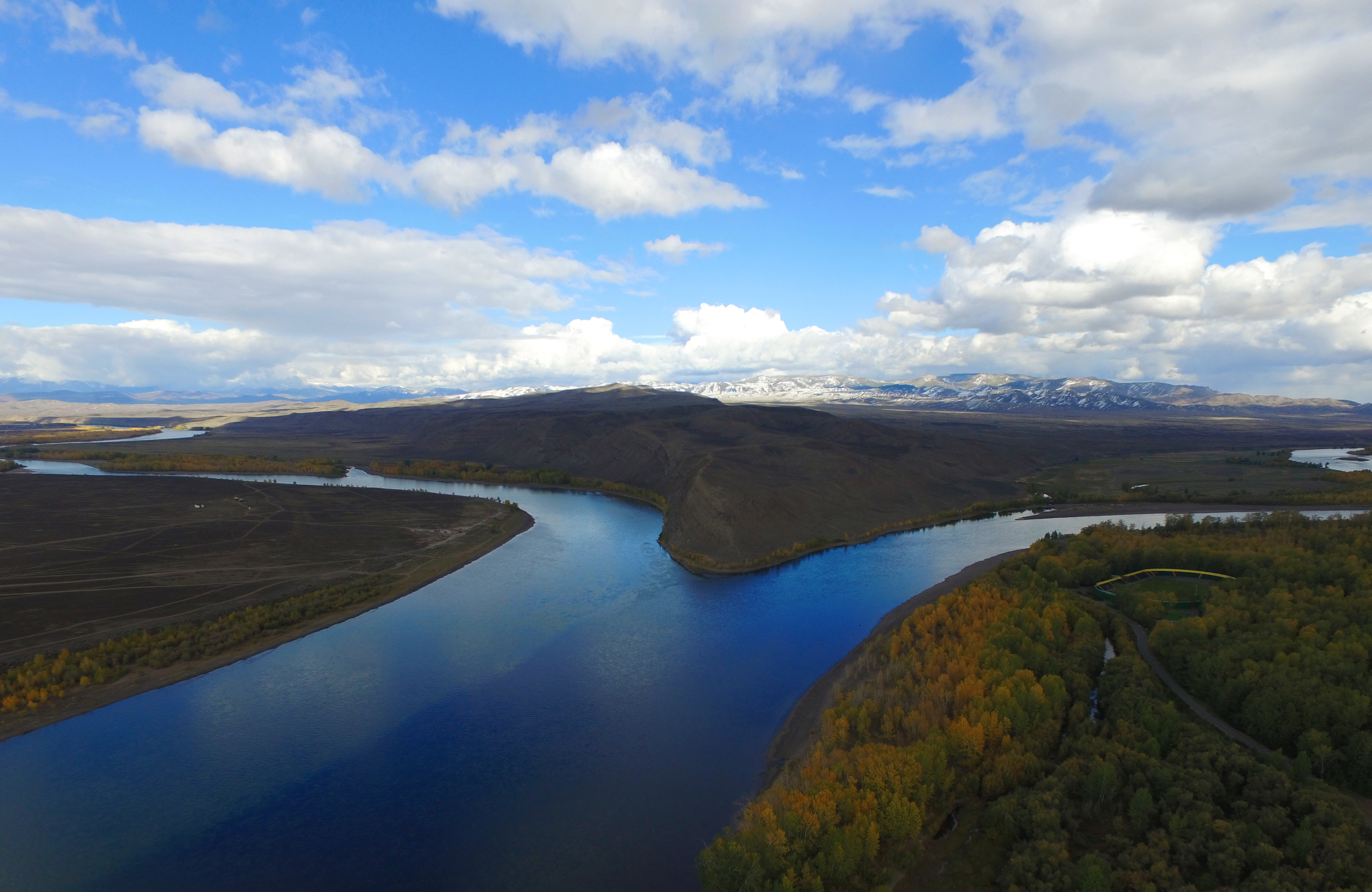
- Confluence of the Kaa-Kem and Pii-Kem Rivers at Kyzyl, Tuva Republic, Russia, in the Sayan intermontane steppe

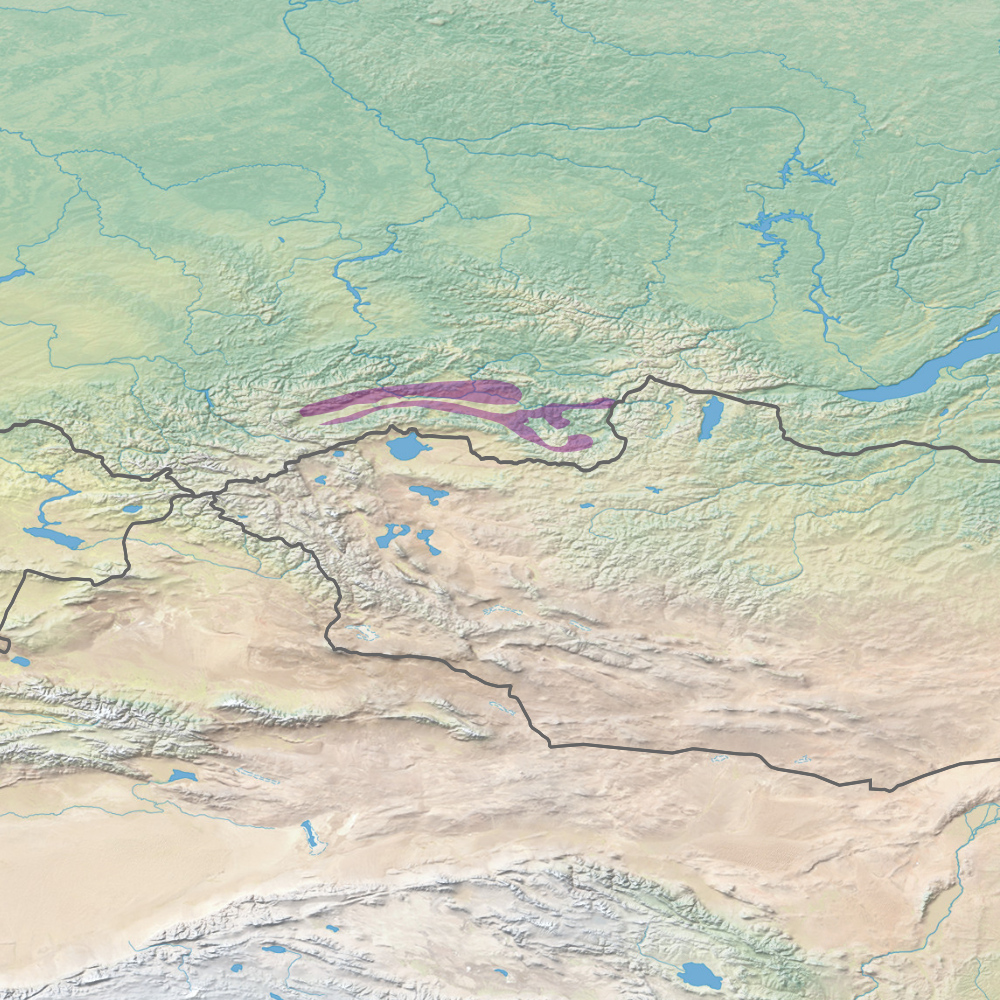
- Ecoregion territory (in purple)

Ecology
- Realm: Palearctic
- Biome: temperate grasslands, savannas, and shrublands

Geography
- Area: 33,928 km^{2} (13,100 sq mi)
- Countries: Mongolia; Russia
- Coordinates: 51.25°N 94.25°E

The Sayan intermontane steppe ecoregion (WWF ID: PA0815) is sometimes referred to as a "steppe island", being an expanse of grassland and shrubs surrounded by mountain forests in the Tyva Republic of south central Siberia, Russia. The Altai Mountains are to the west, the Sayan Mountains to the north, and the Tannu-Ola Mountains to the south. The ecoregion is in the temperate grasslands, savannas, and shrublands biome, and the Palearctic realm, with a Humid Continental climate. For much of its length, it follows the course of the upper Yenisei River. It covers 33,928 km^{2} (13,100 sq mi).

== Location and description ==
The ecoregion ranges over 500 km across the flat terrain north of the Uvs Lake Basin, mostly through the middle of the Tyva Republic, north of the border between Russia and Mongolia. The terrain is relatively flat lowland plains The area is surrounded by the Sayan montane conifer forests ecoregion.

== Climate ==
The region has a Subarctic climate (Koppen classification Dfc). This climate is characterized by high variation in temperature, both daily and seasonally; with long, cold winters and short, cool summers with only three months averaging over 10 °C (50 °F). There is sufficient precipitation (averaging up to 150 mm/year) to support grasses, sedges, and some shrubs. The mean temperature at the center of the ecoregion is −27.5 °C (−17.5 °F) in January, and 17.5 °C (63.5 °F) in July.

== Flora and fauna ==
The ecoregion includes both "true" and "dry steppes", indicating relatively low moisture and narrow leaf species of plants. In the dryer areas, sedges and brush predominate. The area is influenced by the communities of the boreal taiga to the north, and the arid regions of Mongolia to the south. The area has been moderately grazed by sheep over a long period. The soils are generally chestnut or sandy, with dominant species of plants being Stipa krylovii (Feather grass), Potentilla acaulis (Cinquefoils), Festuca ovina (Sheep's fescue), and Artemisia frigida (Fringed sagebrush).

== Protections ==
There are portions of two significant protected areas in the Sayan intermontane steppe ecoregion:

- Sayano-Shushenski Nature Reserve, which has a small sector reaching in to the northwest of the Sayan intermontane steppe ecoregion.
- Uvs Lake Basin, a biosphere reserve with protected portions extending into the Tyva Republic.

== See also ==
- List of ecoregions in Russia
- List of ecoregions in Mongolia
