= South Central Siberia =

Geographical region in North Asia

South Central Siberia is a geographical region in North Asia, just north of the meeting point between Russia, China, Kazakhstan and Mongolia.

Kemerovo Oblast highlighted Kuznetsk Basin to the west and Minusinsk basin to the east. Altai Republic to the south, Altai Krai northwest of that, Khakassia and Tuva to the southeast

== The Four Corners ==
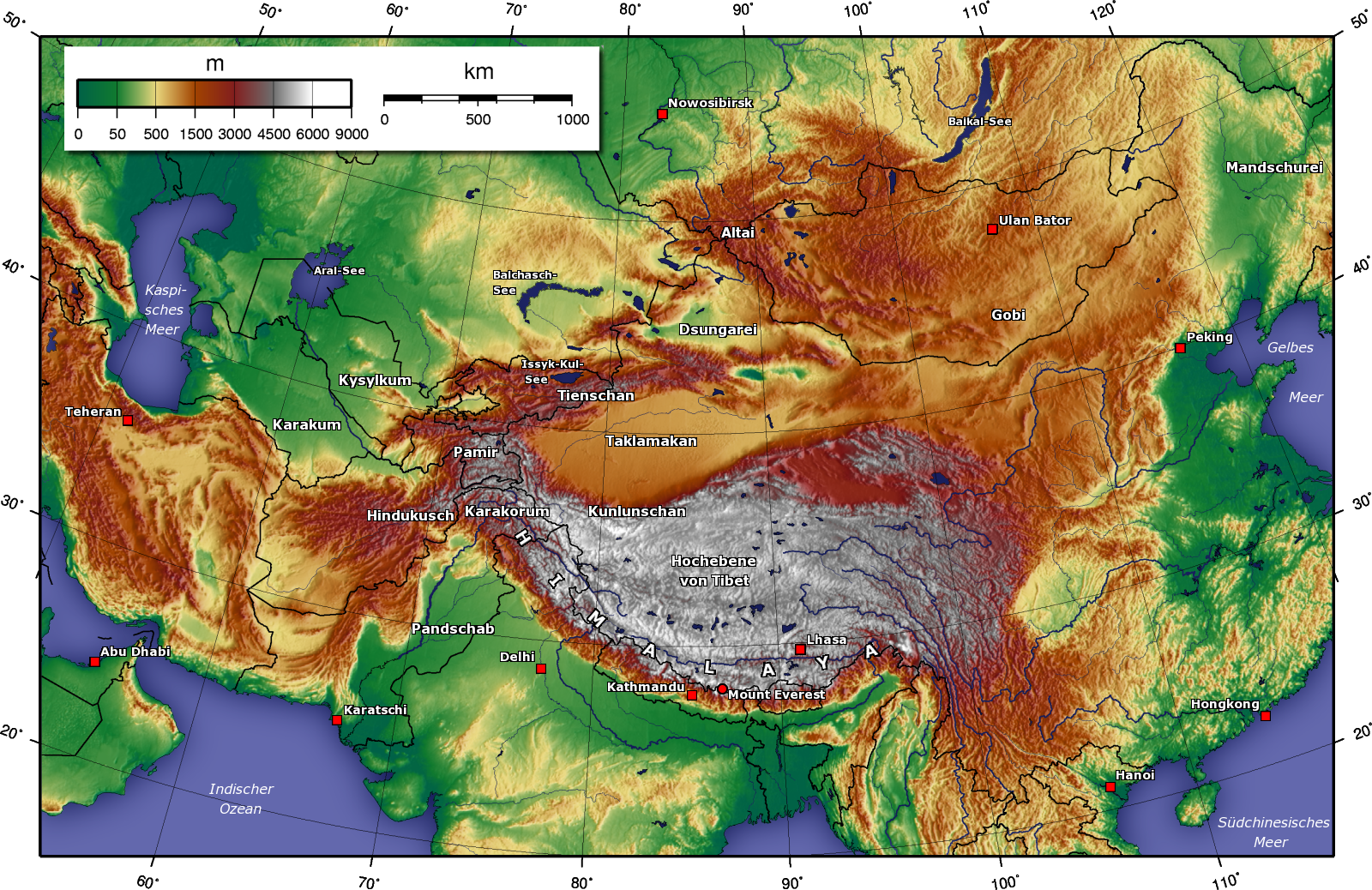
Topographic map of Central Asia. The area in question is between the Altai region and Novosibirsk.

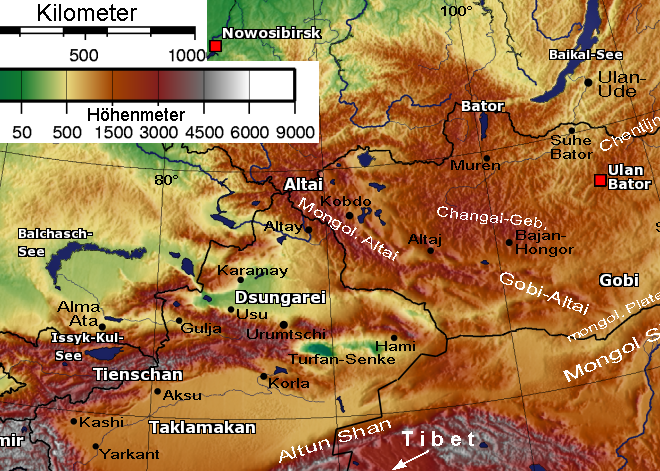
The Altai Mountains and surrounding areas

At approximately 49°8′8″N 87°33′46″E, the borders of Russia, China, Mongolia and Kazakhstan intersect in the Altai Mountains. Mongolia and Kazakhstan are separated by a 55km stretch of the Sino-Russian border between the Altai Republic, a federal subject of Russia, and Altay Prefecture in the Xinjiang Uyghur Autonomous Region of China. To the east, Tavan Bogd Uul in Bayan-Ölgii Province, Mongolia, marks the end of the Sino-Russian border. To the west, is Kazakhstan's East Kazakhstan Province.

The Altai mountains on the Russian side of the border have been designated a UNESCO World Heritage Site.

== South: Altai Republic ==
Above the "Four Corners" and in the southern part of South Central Siberia is the Altai Republic (not to be confused with the Altai Krai to the northwest). It contains the central knot to the Altai Mountains. The area is very mountainous and has few good roads. It was inhabited by various Turkic groups who gradually became the Altay people. As the surrounding steppes filled with Russians, many of the lowland Turks were Russified or retreated to the mountains. The area only came under definitive Russian control in the 1860s. The M52 highway (Russia) runs northwest from here.

== Northern mountain range: Abakans and Kuznetsk Alatau ==
Northern South Central Siberia includes the Altai Republic, which is a 400 km projection of forested mountains which bends slightly to the west at the tip. It is called the Abakan Range in the south and Kuznetsk Alatau in the north. North of its northern end is the town of Tomsk.

== West: Kuznetsk Depression ==
The west part of South Central Siberia includes the steppe of the Kuznetsk Depression, which contains the large Kuznetsk Basin coal fields, the mountains of the Abakans and Kuznetsk Alatau and the Salair Ridge which ends near Novosibirsk.

In the Soviet era, the Kuznetsk Basin coal fields were the largest Russian coal field after the Donets Basin. The name Kuznets means blacksmith and comes from the 'Blacksmith Tatars' or Shors, who were notable metal workers.

The Russians reached the area as early as 1618. The Abakans, Kuznetsk Alatau and the Kuznetsk Basin form the Kemerovo Oblast with its mostly Russian population. The Tom River drains the basin and joins the Ob River north of Tomsk. The town of Novokuznetsk was founded in 1618.

== East: Minusinsk Depression ==
The eastern part of South Central Siberia, between the Kuznetsk Alatau and the Sayan Mountains, includes the steppe of the Minusinsk Depression which is the core of Khakassia. The Yenisei River flows north through its center. The Abakan River flows from the base of the depression north and slightly east to the Yenisei at Abakan town, near where another river comes in from the east. Minusinsk town is a few kilometres east of Abakan. The Chulym River (Ob River) starts in the northwest corner of the depression, arcs into the Taiga north of the Alatau and joins the Ob River. East of the river is the southern tip of Krasnoyarsk Krai.

This area was a center of the Afanasevo culture, a suggested homeland for the Tocharians. Later it was the home of the Yenisei Kirghiz, who gave their name to the Kirgiz further south. The Khakas of Khakassia may be their descendants.

== Southeast: Tuva ==
East of the Altai and southeast of Minusinsk is Tuva. Tuva is bordered on the south by the Tannu-Ola Mountains, which separate it from the Mongolian Great Lakes Depression, on the west by the Altai, on the northwest by the Western Sayans which separate it from the Minusinsk Depression, on the north by the Eastern Sayans and on the east by mountains on the Mongolian border.

The core area is the Tuva Depression, where Kyzyl is located, the capital city of the Tuva Republic. The Yenisei River flows west here and then breaks through the Western Sayans in a long narrow gorge which contains the Sayano-Shushenskaya Dam north of the Tuva border.

Tuva was traditionally part of Mongolia, and only passed to the Soviet Union—Russia in the 20th century.

== Surrounding area ==
To the north, South Central Siberia merges into the Siberian forests.

To the south, South Central Siberia merges into the mountains along the former Sino-Soviet border. Dzungaria is directly to the south.

To the west of South Central Siberia is the agricultural steppe of the Altai Krai with its Russian population. Here the Katun River and the Biya River join to form the Ob River. Further west, between the Ob and Irtysh Rivers are the Baraba steppe in the north and the Kalunda Steppe in the south.

To the east, the Western and then Eastern Sayan Mountains extend east to the southern tip of Lake Baikal.

== Other information ==
- Large cities in South Central Siberia include Novosibirsk on the Ob River, Tomsk north of the Kuznetsk Alatau, Krasnoyarsk north of the Minusinsk Depression on the Yenisei, and Barnaul on the steppe south of Novosibirsk.
- The Trans-Siberian Railway runs through this region from Novosibirsk to Krasnoyarsk.
- The area to the west is steppe or forest-steppe. The steppe curves around north of the Kuznetsk Alatau into the Minusinsk Depression. The land to the north and east is Taiga.
- The Russians first entered the area in about 1620. Seeking furs, they stayed in the forest area to the north. Massive peasant colonization of the steppe area only began after about 1860.

== See also ==
- Altai-Sayan region
- Barabinsk Steppe
- Kanas Lake
- Great Lakes Depression
- Saylyugemsky National Park
- Shorsky National Park
- Denisova Cave
- Ukok Plateau
- Pazyryk Culture
- Lykov family
- South Siberian Mountains
