= Kuznetsk (disambiguation) =

Kuznetsk (Russian: Кузне́цк) is a town in Penza Oblast, Russia.

Kuznetsk may also refer to:

- Kuznetsk, former name of Novokuznetsk, a city in Kemerovo Oblast in south-western Siberia
- Kuznetsk Basin, a large Russian coal mining region in southwestern Siberia
  - Leninsk-Kuznetsky (city), a city in the Kuznetsk Basin
  - Leninsk-Kuznetsky District, an administrative district in the Kemerovo Oblast, Russia, which lies in the Kuznetsk Basin
- Kuznetsk Depression, a geological landform in south-central Siberia

== See also ==
- Kuznetsk Alatau, a mountain range in southern Siberia
- Novokuznetsk, the second most populous city in Kemerovo Oblast, also known as Kuzbass (Кузба́сс), which is a portmanteau for the Kuznetsk Basin
