= Salair =

Salair may refer to:

- Salair (town), a town in Kemerovo Oblast, Russia
- Salair Ridge, an eroded highland in southwestern Siberia, Russia
- Salair National Park
- Salair (airline), an American airline (1980-1998)
