= Gornaya Shoriya =

Territory in southern Siberia, Russia

Coordinates: 52°50′18″N 87°56′14″E

Gornaya Shoria, Mountainous Shoria, or Mountain Shoria (Russian: Горная Шория, Gornaya Shoriya, Shor: Тағлығ Шор, romanized: Taglıg Şor) is a territory in southern Siberia, Russia, east of the Altay Mountains. It is the southern part of Kemerovo Oblast. The indigenous population of the region are the Shors.

The territory is mountainous: spurs of Abakan Range, Salair Ridge and Kuznetsk Alatau. It is rich in ores, and it is also part of the Kuznetsk Coal Basin. Other industries include logging, fur hunting, pine nut harvesting and tourism (ski resort in Sheregesh).

== See also ==
- Gornaya Shoria megaliths
