= Tuva Depression =

- Depression
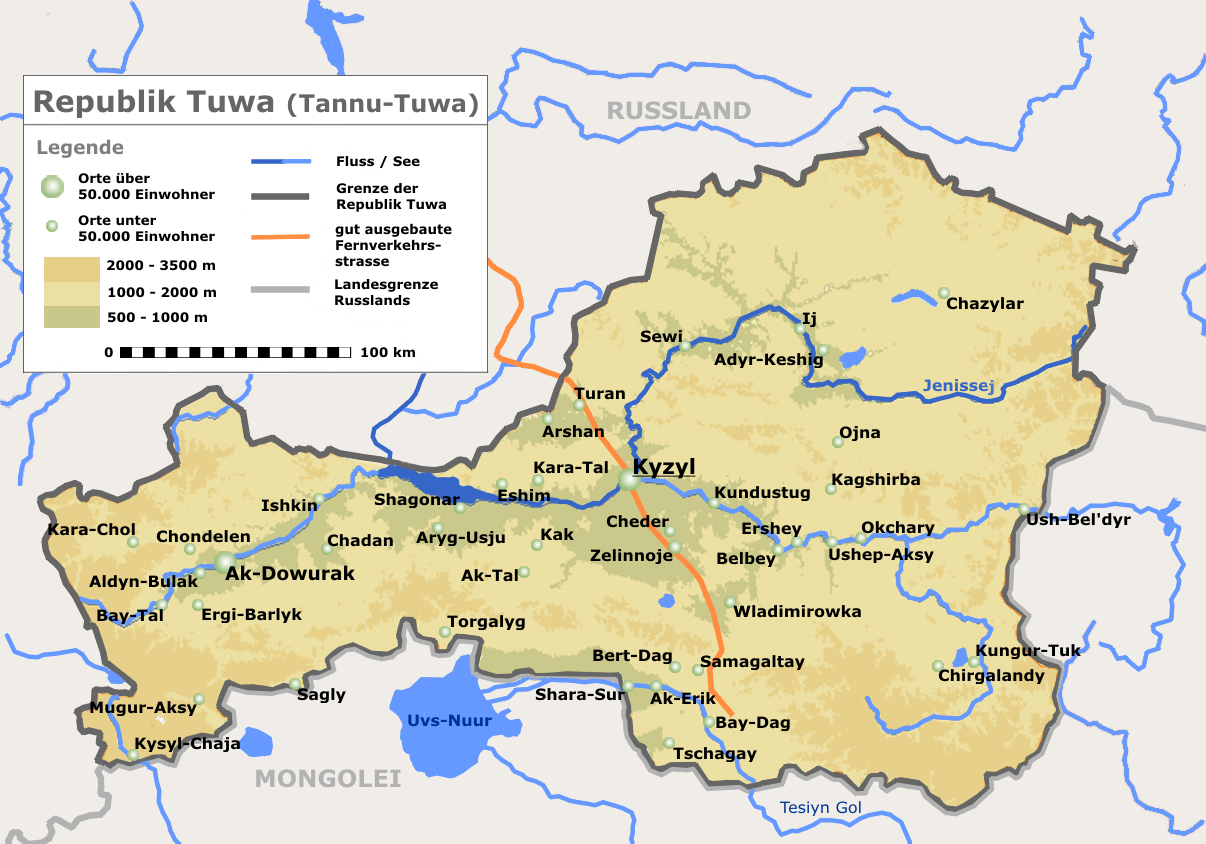
- Tuva map

- Coordinates: 51°35′00″N 93°20′00″E

Tuva Depression (Russian: Тувинская котловина, romanized: Tuvinskaya kotlovina) is located among mountains of South Central Siberia — the Tannu-Ola Mountains, Eastern Sayans and Western Sayans, and the Altay Mountains region. It is part of a region with a combination of raised lands and depressions.

This Tuva Depression is within the Tuva Republic.

The elevation of the depression varies between 500–1,000 metres (1,600–3,300 ft).

== See also ==
- Depression (geology)
- Kuznetsk Depression
- Minusinsk Depression
- Geography of South-Central Siberia
