= Nogino =

Nogino Ногино
- Selo
- Location within Altai Krai Location within Russia
- Coordinates: 53°57′N 84°13′E
- Country: Russia
- Region: Altai Krai
- District: Pervomaysky District
- Time zone: UTC+7:00

Nogino (Russian: Ногино) is a rural locality (a selo) in Akulovsky Selsoviet, Pervomaysky District, Altai Krai, Russia. The population was 3 as of 2013.

== Geography ==
It is located on the Chumysh River.
