= Tannu =

Tannu may refer to:

- Tannu-Tuva, a partially recognized socialist republic
- Tannu-Ola mountains, a mountain range in southern Siberia
- Tannu Uriankhai, a historic region of the Mongol Empire
