= Sayan montane conifer forests =

Coniferous forests in Russia and Mongolia

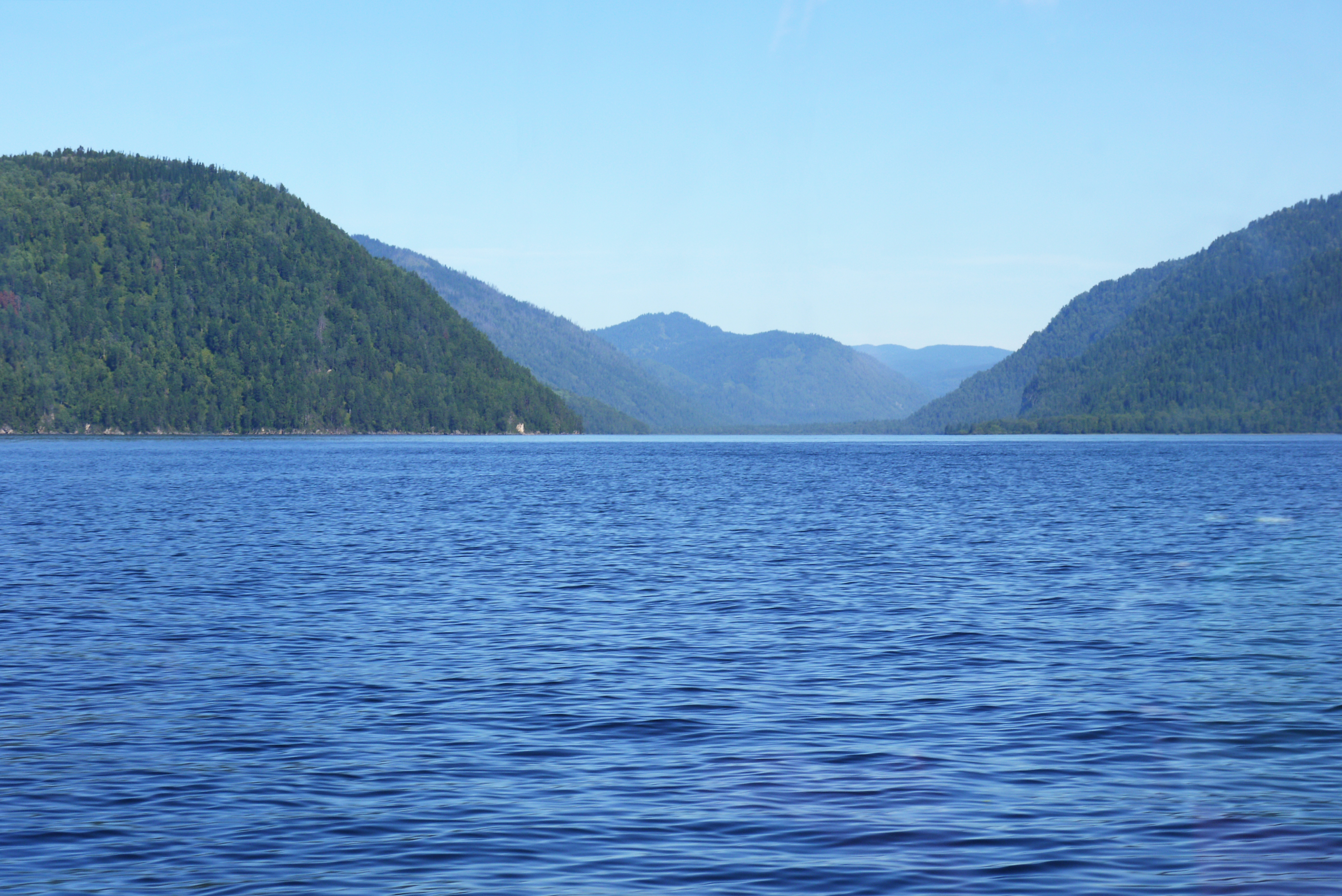
- Altai Nature Reserve, in the ecoregion

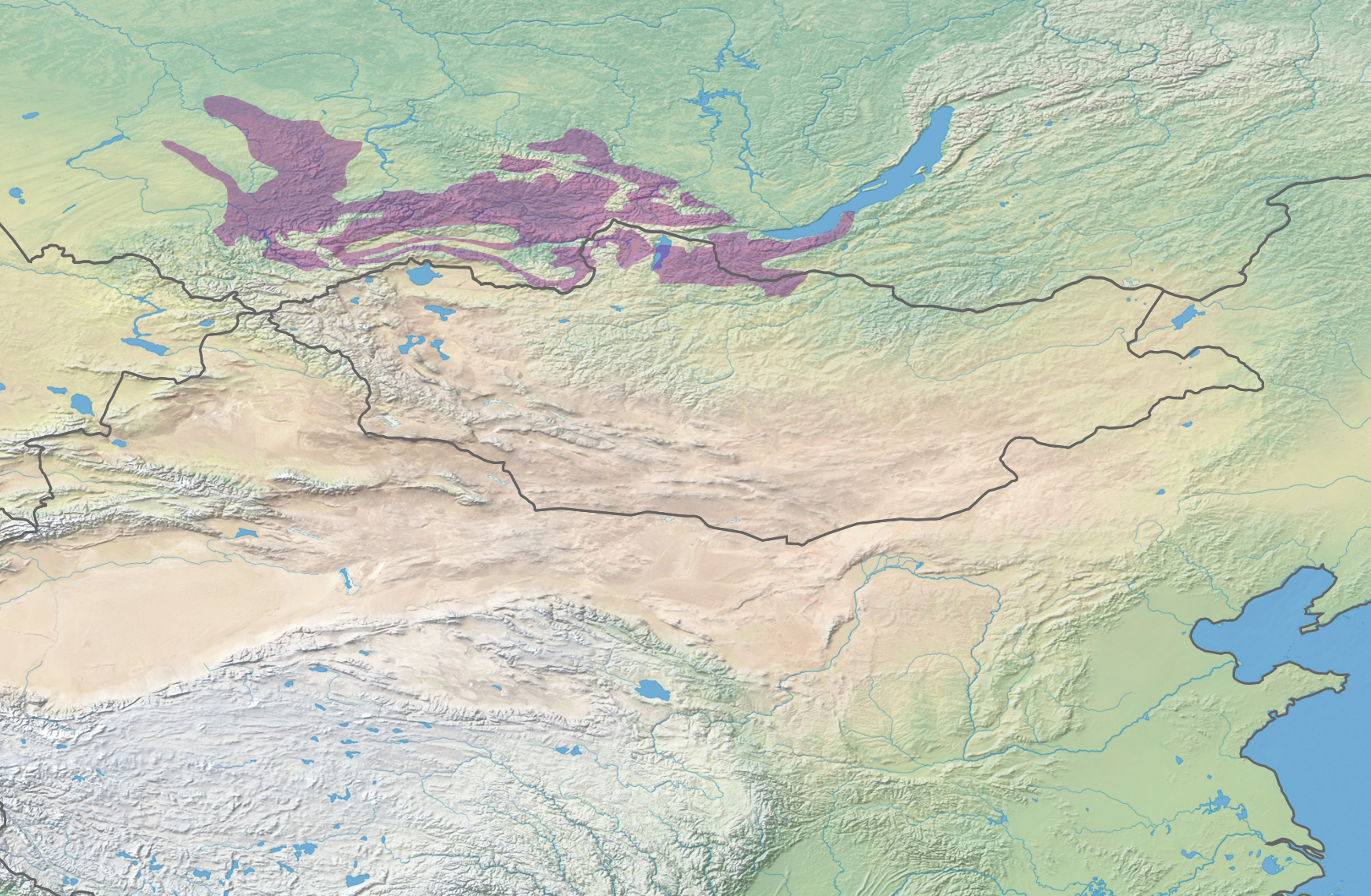
- Ecoregion territory (in purple)

Ecology
- Realm: Palearctic
- Biome: temperate coniferous forests

Geography
- Countries: Russia; Mongolia
- Coordinates: 52.25°N 94.75°E

The Sayan montane conifer forests ecoregion (WWF ID: PA0519) covers the mid-elevation levels of the Sayan Mountains, the high mountain range between the taiga of Siberia, Russia to the north, and the steppes of Mongolia to the south. The slopes of the mountains at the mid-altitudes are covered by Temperate coniferous forest. The ecoregion is in the Palearctic realm, with a cold semi-arid climate. It covers 35,741,835 km^{2} (13,800,000 sq mi).

== Location and description ==
The ecoregion stretches some 2,500 km from the Kuznetsk Alatau mountains in the west, across the western and eastern Sayan Mountain ranges, to the southeastern shores of Lake Baikal. The ecoregion covers the forested mid-altitudes of the mountains, with a lower bound ranging from 600 to 900 meters above sea level (depending on local conditions), and an upper bound of 1,800 meters. This ecoregion is one of high biodiversity, due to its position on the meeting lines of climate and floral zones, and the many micro-climates created by the mountainous terrain and steep river valleys.

== Climate ==
Because of its altitude and distance from the ocean, the ecoregion has a subarctic climate (Köppen climate classification Dfc). This indicates a continental climate characterized by short, cool summers, and very cold, long winters, with wide differences between day and night temperatures. This region is also heavily influenced by the high barometric pressures over Mongolia. The Altai mountains on the west of the ecoregion capture humidity in the winds from the west; precipitation is accordingly higher on the western side of the ecoregion than the drier east.

Climate at 52.25 N, 94.75 E

Climate chart (precipitation, max. and min. temperature)
J	F	M	A	M	J	J	A	S	O	N	D
0.7 −8 −30	0.6 −3 −29	0.9 14 −12	1.9 38 15	2.5 56 29	3.3 67 41	4.6 70 46	4 66 41	2.5 55 32	1.8 38 16	1.6 15 −6	1.1 −4 −24
- █ Average max. and min. temperatures in °F
- █ Precipitation totals in inches
- Source: GlobalSpecies.org
Metric conversion
J	F	M	A	M	J	J	A	S	O	N	D
18 −22 −34	15 −20 −34	23 −10 −25	48 3 −10	64 13 −2	84 19 5	117 21 8	102 19 5	64 13 0	46 3 −9	41 −9 −21	28 −20 −31
- █ Average max. and min. temperatures in °C
- █ Precipitation totals in mm

== Flora and fauna ==
The mid-altitude forest belt can be divided into three sub-zones. The highest is the 'Light Needle-Leaf Sparse Taiga' zone (1,400 meters to 1,800 meters), an open canopy forest of Larix sibirica (Sibirian larch), with notable shrub and grass layers. The 'Dark Needle-Leaf Taiga' zone (900 meters - 1,400 meters) if dominated by Abies sibirica (Siberian fir) and stands of Pinus sibirica (Siberian pine) and Picea obovata (Siberian spruce). The 'dark taiga' zone (600 meters to 900 meters) has the same trees as the middle sub-zone, but more vertically developed shrub and grass layers, and richer soil. Over 800 species of flora are recorded in the ecoregion.

== Protections ==
Officially protected areas in the region include:

- Altai Nature Reserve ("Altaisky"). An IUCN class Ia "strict ecological reserve" (a Zapovednik) located in the north and east of Altai Republic. (Area: 8,812 km^{2}).
- Baikal Nature Reserve ("Baikalsky"). An IUCN class Ia "strict ecological reserve" (a Zapovednik) located on the southeast shore of Lake Baikal and the neighboring central part of the Khamar-Daban Range, in southern Buryatia. (Area: 1,657 km^{2}).
- Khakassia Nature Reserve ("Khakassky"). An IUCN class Ia "strict ecological reserve" (a Zapovednik) covering two large mountain areas (alpine and mountain-steppe), and a cluster of seven steppe sites located within the left bank of the Minusinsk Hollow. (Area: 2,675 km^{2}).
- Kuznetsk Alatau Nature Reserve. An IUCN class Ia "strict ecological reserve" (a Zapovednik) located on the Kuznetsk Alatau, a mountain ridge in the Altai-Sayan mountain region in southwestern Siberia, in the watershed of the Tom River and the Chuly River. (Area: 4,129 km^{2}).
- Sayano-Shushenski Nature Reserve. An IUCN class Ia "strict ecological reserve" (a Zapovednik) located in a remote area of the West Sayan Mountains of south Siberia, on the southern bank of the Yenisei River along the Sayano-Shushenskoye reservoir. (Area: 3,904 km^{2}).
- Shorsky National Park. An IUCN class Ia "strict ecological reserve" (a Zapovednik) located where the West Siberian Plain meets the South Siberian Mountain. (Area: 4,180 km^{2}).
- Shushensky Bor National Park. An IUCN class Ia "strict ecological reserve" (a Zapovednik) located in the extreme southwest of Siberia, in the northern foothills of the Western Sayan Mountains. (Area: 392 km^{2}).
- Tunkinsky National Park. An IUCN class Ia "strict ecological reserve" (a Zapovednik) located in a mountainous region centered on the Irkut River valley (also referred to as the Tunka Valley) that continues from the rift valley of Lake Baikal southwest to the border of Mongolia. (Area: 11,837 km^{2}).
- Ubsunur Hollow Biosphere Reserve. An IUCN class Ia "strict ecological reserve" (a Zapovednik) located a fragile mountain hollow or depression located on the territorial border of Mongolia and the Republic of Tuva in the Russian Federation among the mountains — Tannu-Ola Mountains, and the Altay Mountains region. (Area: 10,688 km^{2}).
- Lake Khövsgöl National Park (Mongolia). The park covers territory surrounding Lake Khovsgul, the largest freshwater lake in Mongolia (over 1,000 square miles and averaging over 450 feet in depth). (Area: 8,381 km^{2})
- Tengis-Shishged National Park (Mongolia). Covers the lower Shishged River as if flows west from the Darkhad Valley in northern Mongolia. The landscape is one of high peaks with steep sides and wide glaciated valleys. (Area: 8,757 km^{2})

== See also ==
- List of ecoregions in Russia
- List of ecoregions in Mongolia
