= Shorsky National Park =

National park in Russia

- IUCN category II (national park)
- Shorsky National Park
- Location within Russia
- Location: Tashtagolsky District of the Kemerovo Oblast
- Nearest city: Kemerovo
- Coordinates: 52°35′N 88°20′E
- Area: 418,000 hectares (1,032,900 acres; 4,180 km^{2}; 1,614 sq mi)
- Established: December 27, 1989

Shorsky National Park (Russian: Шорский национальный парк) is a forested, mountainous area in southwestern Siberia, where the West Siberian Plain meets the South Siberian Mountains. It is representative of areas with dark taiga tree cover (92% of the park is forested). With an area of 1,614 square miles (4,180 km^{2}), the park covers over a third of Tashtagolsky District at the southern end of Kemerovo Oblast, about 300 kilometres (190 mi) south of the city of Kemerovo. The area is the home of the Shors people, and has historically been associated with mining and logging industries before being established as a protected area in 1999.

== Topography ==
Most of the park is of medium-sized mountains, with deep river valleys. The mountains average 500–800 metres (1,600–2,600 ft) in height above sea level, with a maximum of 1,555 metres (5,102 ft) on Kubez Mountain. On the west it is bordered by a spur of the higher Altai mountain range, and to the east by the Abakan Range. The Mrassu River (meaning "Siberian Pine River" in the Shor language), is the main river through the park, running from north to south through its middle. The park stretches 110 km north to south, and 90 km east to west. Much of the geology is karst landscape, with soluble rocks such as limestone creating the conditions for springs, caves, and unusual rock formations.

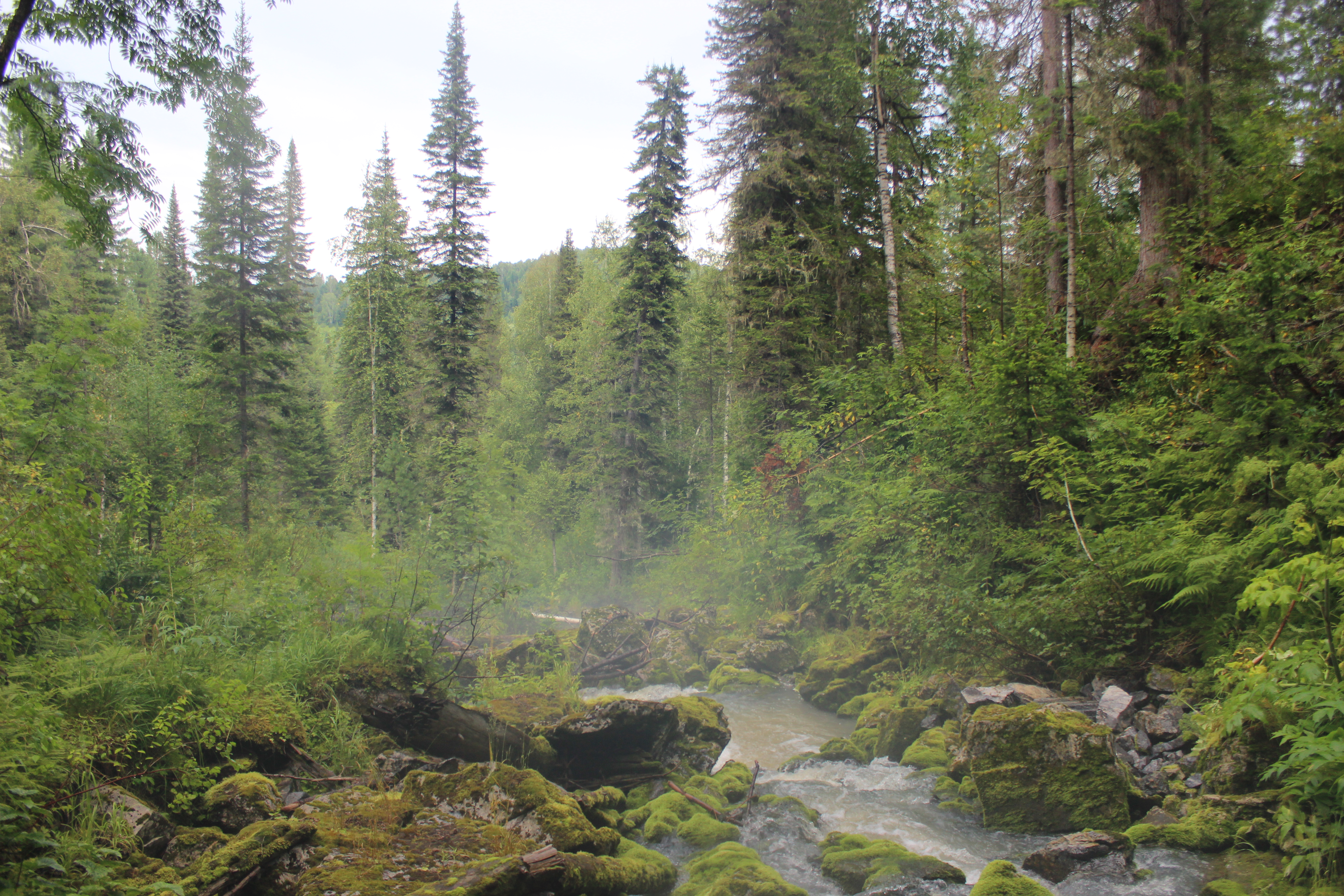
Shor, Tashtogal District

The park provides paths and access to particular land-forms of interest. These include the "Saga Waterfall", a multi-tier cascade over rocks to a calm pool and grotto from a height of 15 meters; the "Tsar's Gate" rocks, a large formation with an opening through it on a rise over the Mrassu river; the "Moonlight" cave, 200 meters long and covered inside with stalactites and stalagmites; the "Azasskoy" cave, which boasts a large gallery; and over 60 other named caves and outcrops.

== Climate ==
The climate of Shorsky is Humid continental climate, warm summer (Köpen climate classification (Dfb)). This climate is characterized by large swings in temperature, both diurnally and seasonally, with mild summers and cold, snowy winters. The area as unusual characteristics due to the distance from ocean, the topography of the surrounding area, and the local westerly winds – the park is an area of local high temperatures and high precipitation (rainfall averages 950 mm/year, and average snow cover is 70 cm).

== Plants ==
The park is in the 'Sayan montane conifer forests' ecoregion. The forested area is southern Siberian tiaga, with Siberian pine and Siberian fir being the most common trees. Less common are spruce, pine and aspen; willows are found along low floodplains. The diversity of plants in Shorksy reflects the park's position as a forested transition zone between the Altair mountains and the lower Siberian lands. The park has recorded 51 species of tree and bush, over 600 vascular plants, 300 species of moss, and over 200 species of mushrooms.

== Animals ==
Large mammals in the park include brown bear, red deer, roe deer, mink, and sable (for which is the area is particularly known). There are 61 recorded mammal species, 183 bird species, and 14 species of fish. Other predatory mammals include wolf, fox, wolverine, weasel, ermine, mink, otter, badger, and lynx. There are relatively few species associated with steppe and forest-steppe landscapes.

== History ==
The indigenous Shor people have traditionally considered this area their home. Historically, they have been known in Russia for their iron-smelting skills, and for their practice of Shamanism. Today, there are small Shor villages in the park along the river banks. Active logging in the area ceased after creation of the park, and the mature forest is now growing.

== Tourism ==
Visitors are welcome; hiking, horseback riding, climbing, and caving are popular. Tickets to the protected area can be obtained at the park headquarters in the town of Tashtagol. Tour guides in the area provided guided hikes, rafting tours on the Mrassu River, and facilities outside the park. There are three shelters in the park in which visitors can stay in wooden huts in all seasons.

== See also ==
- National parks of Russia
- Nature reserves of Russia (zapovedniks)
