= Suenga (river) =

- Native name: Суенга (Russian)

Location
- Country: Russia
- Region: Novosibirsk Oblast

Physical characteristics
- Mouth: Berd
  - coordinates: 54°37′43″N 84°58′14″E
- Length: 71 km (44 mi)

Suenga (Russian: Суенга) is a river in Maslyaninsky District of Novosibirsk Oblast. The river flows into the Berd. Its length is 71 km (44 mi), with drainage basin 821 square kilometres. The river rises on the western slopes of the Salair Ridge.

== Tributaries ==
Kinterep (2 km), Mostovka (11 km), Kamenka (22 km), Bolshiye Taily (31 km), Drazhny Taily (44 km), Poldnevaya (57 km).

== Economy ==
In 1781, a gold deposit was discovered near the river by the exiled D. M. Popov. In 1830 Yegoryevsky Gold Mine was founded here. The mines were owned by the Imperial Cabinet, English and German concessionaires and the Russian Gold Mining Society at different times. Gold was also mined during the Soviet period and continues to be mined in the 21st century.

From the 1950s to the 1970s, a hydroelectric power plant operated on the river.
