= Kuznetsk Depression =

- Depression
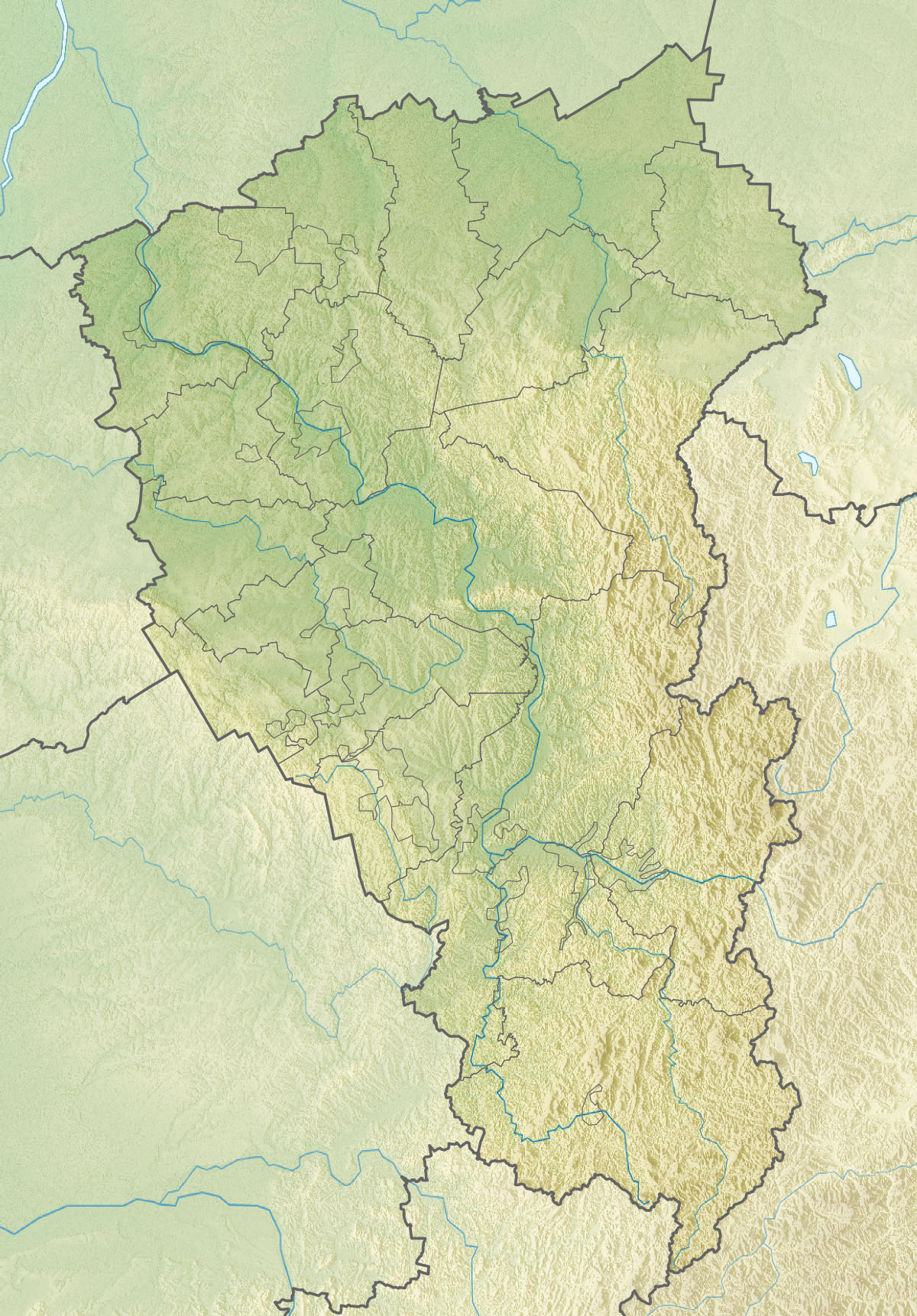
- Coordinates: 54°13′26″N 86°20′32″E

Area
  - Total: 70,000 km^{2} (27,000 mi^{2})

Kuznetsk Depression (Russian: Кузнецкая котловина, Kuznetskaya kotlovina) is located among mountains of South-Central Siberia, including: Kuznetsk Alatau to the Northeast, Salair Ridge to the Southwest, and Mountainous Shoria to the South. It is within Kemerovo Oblast.

== Geography ==
The depression has elevations up to 500 metres (1,600 ft),. It has an area of 70,000 km^{2}, with a length of 400 kilometres (250 mi) and width of 120 kilometres (75 mi).

It is split by a network of river valleys. The major rivers are the Tom River and Inya River, with other tributaries of Ob River.

The central section has several Mesozoic basalt mountain ridges with heights of 600–740 metres (1,970–2,430 ft). They include Taradanov's Ridge, Saltymakov's Ridge, and the Karakan Mountains.

== Economy ==
The Kuznetsk Depression contains the famous coal-mining Kuznetsk Basin. The main cities in it are Kemerovo, Novokuznetsk, and Prokopyevsk.

== See also ==
- Kuznetsk Basin
- Depression (geology)
- Geography of South-Central Siberia
- Minusinsk Depression
- Tuva Depression
