= Shushensky Bor National Park =

National park of Russia

- Russian: Шушенский бор
- IUCN category II (national park)
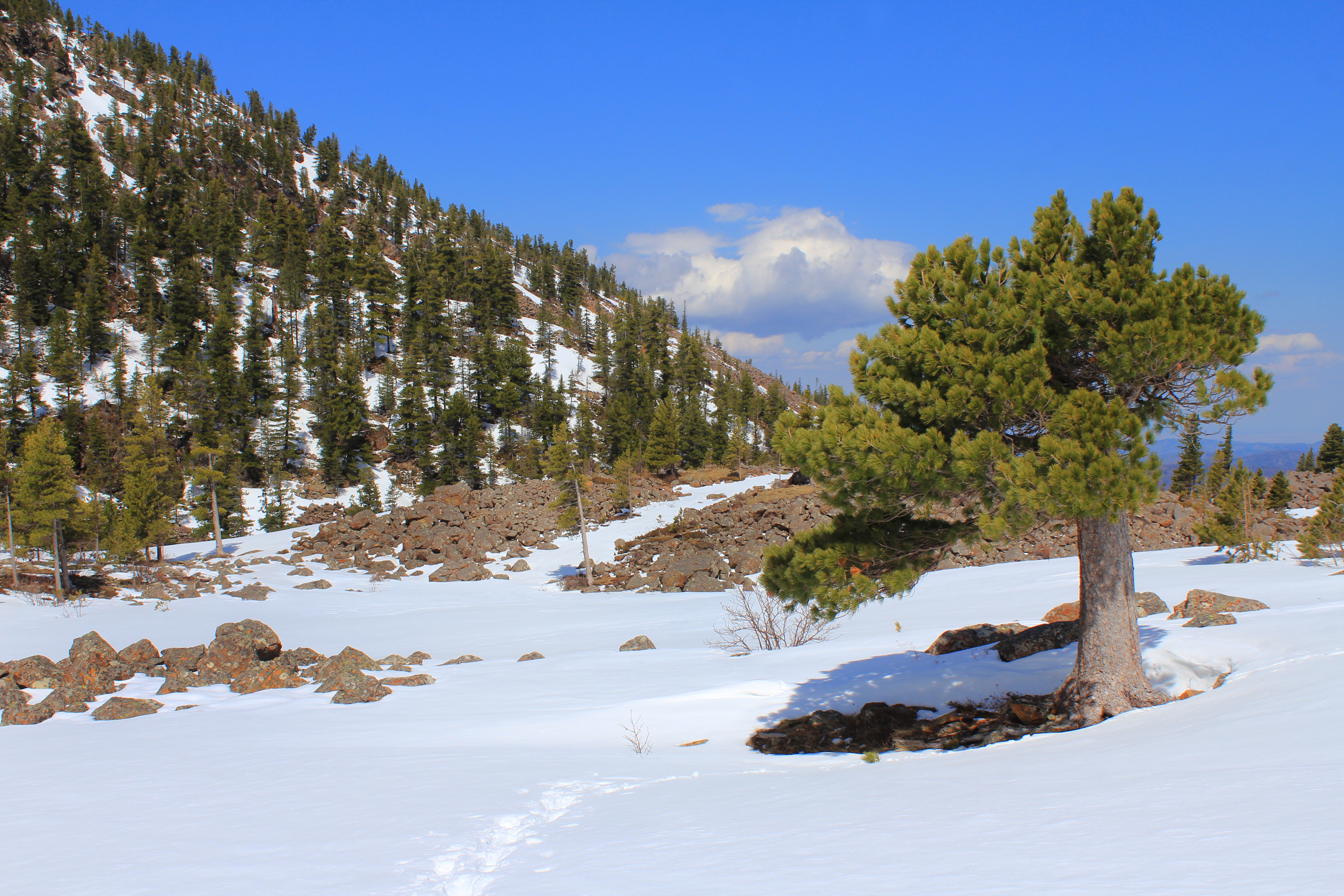

- Location within Russia
- Location: Krasnoyarsk Krai
- Nearest city: Shushenskoye
- Coordinates: 52°42′N 91°30′E
- Area: 39,180 hectares (96,816 acres; 392 km^{2}; 151 sq mi)
- Established: 1995
- Governing body: FGBU "Shushensky Bor"
- Website: http://www.shushbor.ru/

Shushensky Bor National Park (Russian: (национальный парк «Шушенский бор»)) ("Sushenshky Forest") consists of two representative forests in the extreme southwest of Siberia, in the northern foothills of the Western Sayan Mountains. The northern section is forest-steppe in character, while the southern section is mountain conifer forest. The southern section is bordered on two sides by the Yenisei river reservoir behind the Sayano-Shushenskaya Dam, the largest hydroelectric dam in Russia. The forest has both high biodiversity value and recreational value for hikers and tourists. It is located in the Shushensky District of Krasnoyarsk Krai.

== Topography ==
The forest is divided into two parts: a small section ("Preovsky") located on relatively flat forest-steppe land (the "Minusink basin") 60 km north of the ridge of the West Sayan Mountains, and a much larger "Mountain section" on the north slope of the Western Sayan range. The forest displays the transition between two climatic zones - forest-steppe and taiga, as well as altitude zoning in the types of trees and forest community. The Perovsky (forest-steppe zone, 4,410 ha) and Mountain (Western Sayan, 34,760 ha) combine for a total area of 39,170 hectares (96,800 acres).

Area of Sushensky Forest National Park. Sayano-Shushenskoye Reservoir (of the Yenisei River) is southern boundary, The Sayano-Shushenskaya Dam in upper left, at the town of Cheremushky

The western and southern borders of the Mountain section are formed by the Sayano-Shushenskoye Reservoir, backed up behind the Sayano-Shushenskaya Dam.

The mountain section in dominated by the Borus Massive, a high ridge of five peaks that runs north-south through the middle of the forest. The highest peak is Mt. Poilovo (2,309 metres (7,575 ft)).

== Climate and ecoregion ==
The ecoregion for the Mountain section of Shushensky Bor is Sayan montane conifer forests (WWF ID#509). This region describes the mid-elevation portion of the high mountains of Siberia, in the transition zone between the Siberian taiga and the Mongolian steppe. Flora and fauna at any locality is determined by relief and elevation.

The climate of the Shushensky area is Humid continental climate, warm summer (Köppen climate classification (Dfb)). This climate is characterized by large swings in temperature, both diurnally and seasonally, with mild summers and cold, snowy winters.

Shushenskoye, (Russia)

Climate chart (precipitation, max. and min. temperature)
J	F	M	A	M	J	J	A	S	O	N	D
0.5 7 −15	0.4 13 −13	0.4 30 5	0.9 50 27	1.7 66 39	2.3 77 51	3 80 56	2.8 76 51	1.9 64 39	1.3 46 27	0.8 26 8	0.6 12 −7
- █ Average max. and min. temperatures in °F
- █ Precipitation totals in inches
- Source: climate-date.org
Metric conversion
J	F	M	A	M	J	J	A	S	O	N	D
13 −14 −26	9.9 −11 −25	8.9 −1 −15	23 10 −3	44 19 4	58 25 10	76 27 13	70 24 11	49 18 4	34 8 −3	20 −3 −14	16 −11 −22
- █ Average max. and min. temperatures in °C
- █ Precipitation totals in mm

== Plants ==
Except for the treeless alpine tundra zone at the top of the Borus Massif, the forest is a subalpine zone and divided into three subzones. Above 1,400 meters is the light needle-leaf sparse taiga. From 900 - 1,400 meters is the dark needle-leaf taiga. Below 900 meters is the black taiga pine forest on rich alluvial soils. In Spring, the alpine meadows are bright with colorful flowers.

== Animals ==
Common mammals in the park include hare, red squirrel, brown bear, common fox, sable, red deer, roe deer, musk deer, elk, and wild boar. Bird records indicate the presence of 272 species, including golden eagle (Aquila chrysaetos), Osprey (Pandion haliaetus), and Black Stork (Cinonia nigra).

== Tourism ==
Hiking and ecotourism are popular due to the remoteness and diversity of the terrain, plants, and animals. There are developed educational trails, and the park offers guided tours and services. Visitors are required to register and pay a small fee to enter the mountain section. The park also runs boat excursions on the reservoir (sometimes called the "Sayan Sea").

== See also ==
- Protected areas of Russia
- 2009 Sayano-Shushenskaya power station accident
- Zapovednik
