= Gornaya Shoria megaliths =

Rock formation in Siberia

Coordinates: 53°15′6.44″N 88°32′37.20″E

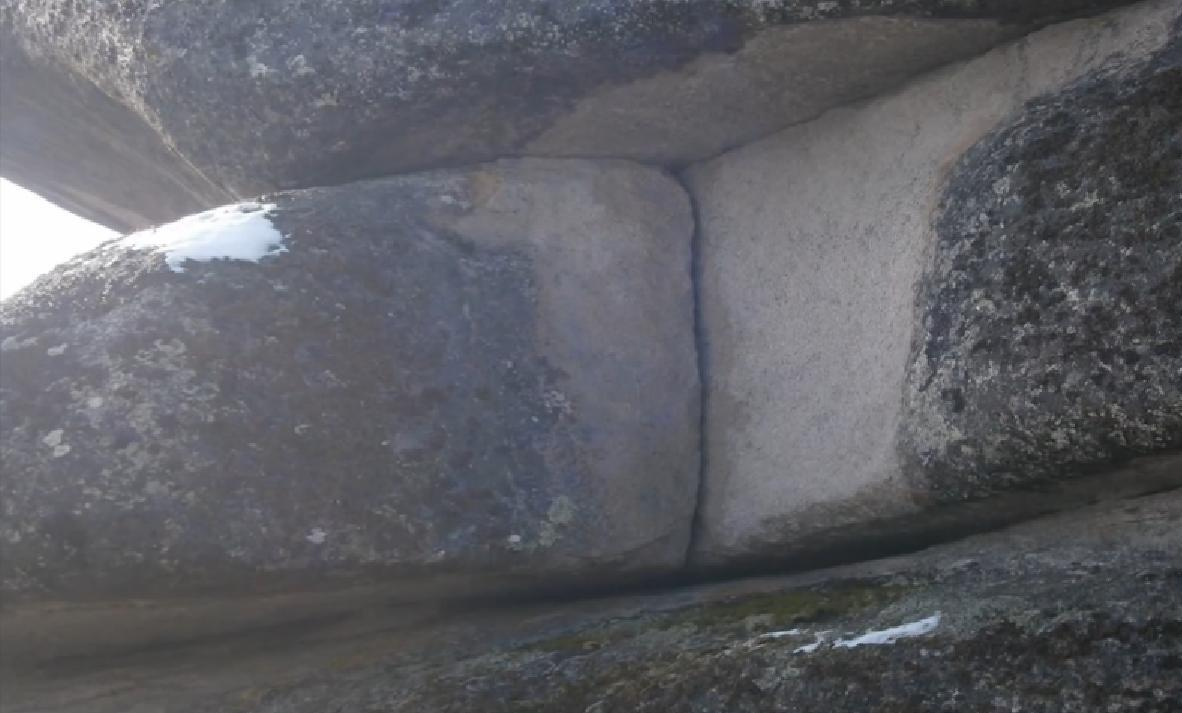
Shoria megaliths

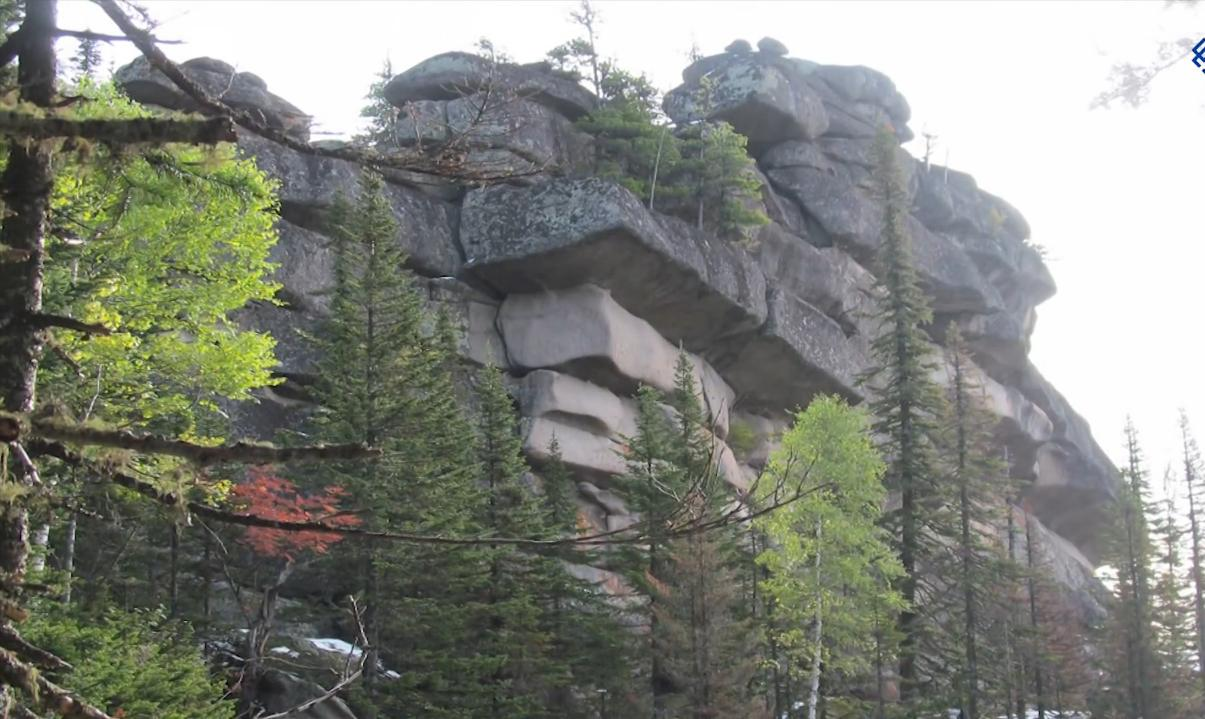
Shoria megaliths

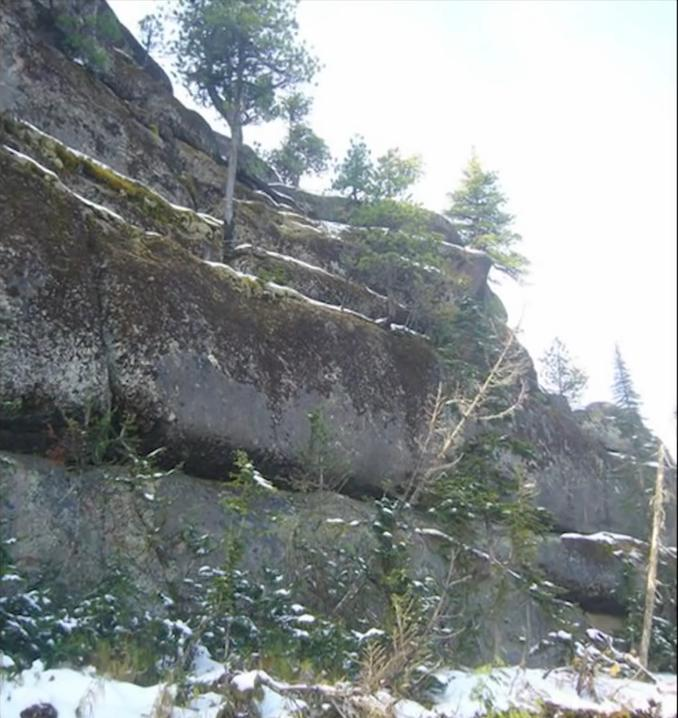
Shoria megaliths

The Gornaya Shoria megaliths, meaning Mountain Shoria megaliths, are rock formations found within the Mountain Shoria (Gornaya Shoriya)(Russian: Горная Шория) region that comprises the southern part of Kemerovo Oblast in southern Siberia, Russia. The Gornaya Shoria megaliths, also known as the Surak-Kuilum megalithic complex and by other names, form the ridgecrests and summit of Mount Kuylyum (Kuilum, Kulyum)(Russian: Горна Куйлюм), 1,203 m (3,947 ft) in elevation. The base of this mountain is located 8 km away from the village of Orton (Russian: Ортон). Mount Kuylyum is part of the Kulyum-Surak granite massif in the Shoria Mountains. The ridgecrests and summits of this massif ranges in elevation between 700 and 1,203 m (2,297 and 3,947 ft).

Fringe articles have claimed these rock formations are gigantic prehistoric man-made blocks, or megaliths. Geologic mapping of ridgecrests and summit of Mount Kuylyum by geologists, which was conducted in the late 1990s, identified these rock formations as denudated prepared ridges (Russian: Денудационные отпрепарированные гребни и гряды), which are ridges created by the natural and differential erosion of local bedrock.

== Theories on formation ==
Russian popular articles have reported that scientists have proposed the rock formation to be the result of geological processes associated with the intense weathering of the rock composing Mount Shoriya. Both tectonic forces acting on deeply buried bedrock and pressure release that occurs within nearsurface bedrock as it is uplifted and eroded commonly form rectangular, block-like, rock formations that consist of jointed rock. Tectonic forces acting on deeply buried massive bedrock, such as granite, and pressure release as this bedrock is uncovered by erosion, can create sets of joints which are known as orthogonal joint sets, that intersect at nearly 90 degrees. Orthogonal joint sets quite often result in the formation of rock formations that are comparable in size and shape to the blocks shown in pictures of the alleged megaliths.

It is quite common for spheroidal weathering, a form of chemical weathering, to occur as groundwater circulates through orthogonal joint sets in the near-surface. This process results in the alteration and disintegration of bedrock adjacent to the joints. The preferential removal of weathered bedrock by erosion often creates bedrock blocks, which are called corestones. These bedrock blocks commonly have rounded corners and are separated from each other by cracks of variable size. Such corestones form both hills and mountains composed of exposed and rectangular blocks of jointed bedrock that are comparable to the rock formations found in the Mountain Shoriya. These hills and mountains are known as either tors or koppies.
