= Salair National Park =

National park of Russia

- (Russian: Салаир)
- IUCN category II (national park)
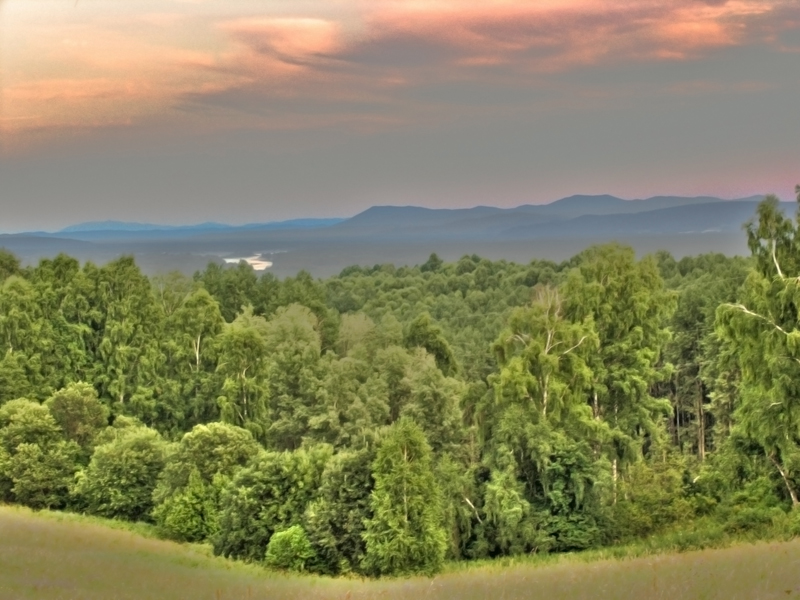
- Southern Salair Ridge in distance, from Soltonsky District

- Location within Russia
- Location: Altai Republic
- Nearest city: Barnaul
- Coordinates: 53°30′N 86°24′E
- Area: 161,221 hectares (398,386 acres; 1,612 km^{2}; 622 sq mi)
- Established: September 11, 2020
- Governing body: FGBU "Salair"
- Website: http://www.tigirek.ru/en/node/1653

Salair National Park (Russian: Национальный парк «Салаир») is located on the west slope of the Salair Ridge, which separates Altai Krai (west side) from Kemerovo Oblast (east side). The low mountains are covered with coniferous forest, while the non-park surroundings to the west are steppe and forest steppe that has mostly been converted to agriculture. Because of its warm, humid summers, scientists have referred to Salair as the "rainforest of Siberia", with resulting high biodiversity and relict plants preserved from the pre-glacial period. The park was officially created in 2020; it is located in the districts of Zarinsk, Togulsky, Yeltsovsky and Soltonsky of Altai Krai.

== Topography ==
In aspect, the Salair resemble gentle hills: the highest point in the park is Mount Kivda (621 metres (2,037 ft)). The terrain is marked by a highly networked system of ravines and valleys. The Salair Ridge is a low northern extension of the Altai Mountains.

== Ecoregion and climate ==
The Salair ridge forms a northwestern extension of the Sayan montane conifer forests ecoregion. It is closely surrounded at lower altitudes on the east and west by the Western Siberian hemiboreal forests ecoregion.

The climate of the park is Humid continental climate, warm summer (Köppen climate classification (Dfb)). This climate is characterized by large seasonal temperature differentials and a warm summer (at least four months averaging over 10 °C (50 °F), but no month averaging over 22 °C (72 °F).

Barnaul, Altai Krai

Climate chart (precipitation, max. and min. temperature)
J	F	M	A	M	J	J	A	S	O	N	D
1.2 8 −5	1.1 14 −1	1.2 30 13	1.6 49 28	2 65 43	2.6 75 56	3.3 77 59	2.3 74 55	1.9 62 44	1.9 47 32	2.2 27 15	1.8 15 2
- █ Average max. and min. temperatures in °F
- █ Precipitation totals in inches
- Source: world-climates.com
Metric conversion
J	F	M	A	M	J	J	A	S	O	N	D
30 −13 −21	28 −10 −18	30 −1 −10	41 10 −2	51 18 6	66 24 13	84 25 15	58 23 13	48 17 7	48 8 0	56 −3 −9	46 −10 −17
- █ Average max. and min. temperatures in °C
- █ Precipitation totals in mm

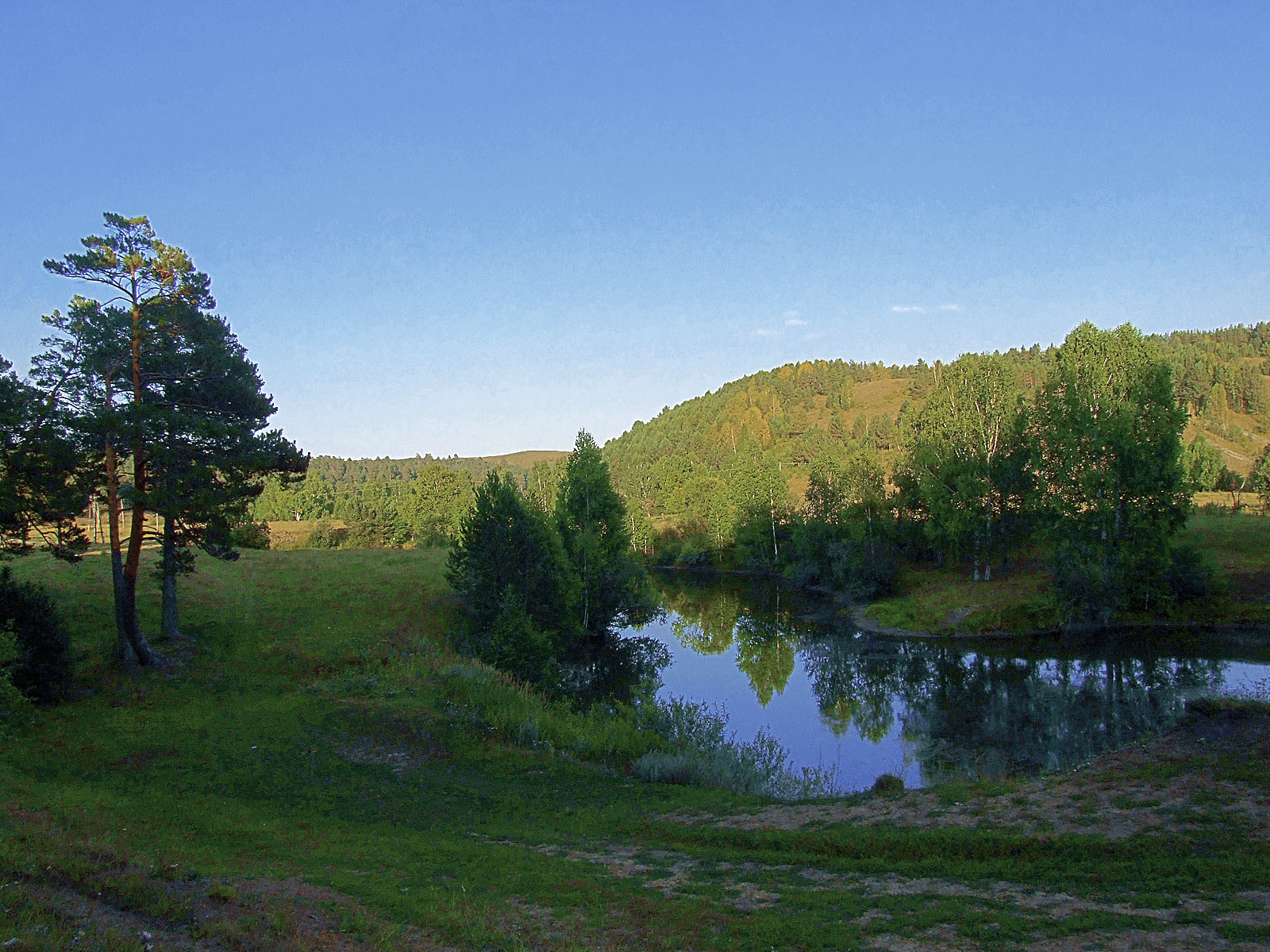
Forest on Salair Ridge

== Plants and animals ==
The park is covered with "dark taiga" coniferous forest: stands of Pinus sibirica (Siberian pine), Picea obovata (Siberian spruce), Abies sibirica (Siberian fir), and stands of Tilia sibirica L. (Siberian linden), with vertically developed shrub and grass layers. There are occasional stands of old-growth cedar and the only stand of indigenous Populus tremula (Quaking aspen) in Siberia. Individual Siberian pines reach 800 years old. Present on the forest floor are Asperula odorata, Asarum europaeum, Sanicula europaea, and Brachypodium sylvaticum There are tall grasses and meadow steppe terrain at lower altitude and in clearings.

Mammals in the park include elk, red deer, roe deer, marmot, American mink, and beaver.

== See also ==
- Protected areas of Russia
