= Abakan Range =

Mountain range in Siberia, Russia

- Абаканский хребет
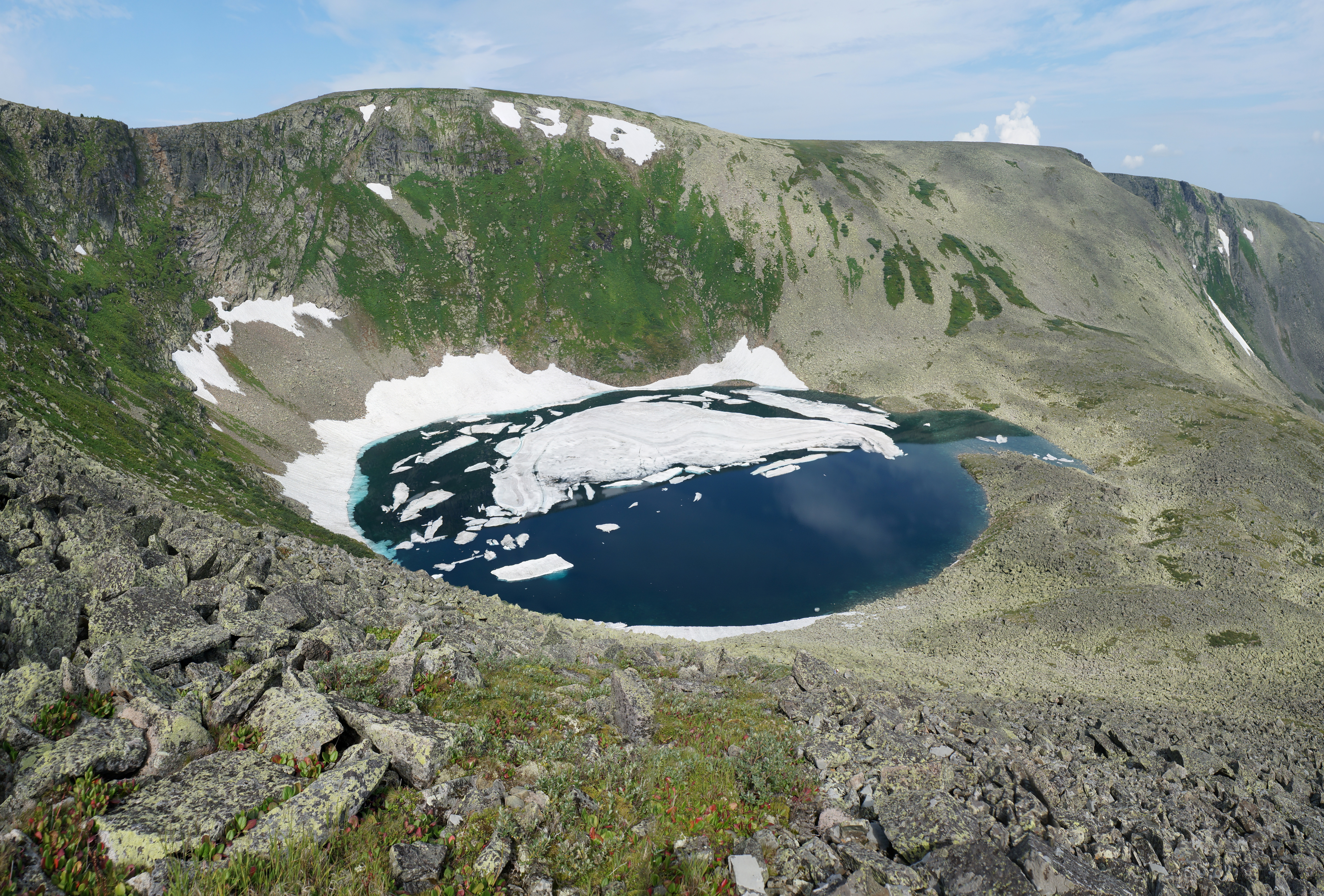
- Bolshaya Koltaiga, a mountain of the Abakan Range

Highest point
- Peak: Choochek
- Elevation: 1,984 m (6,509 ft)

Dimensions
- Length: 300 km (190 mi)

Geography
- Location within Russia
- Country: Russia
- Region: Siberia
- Range coordinates: 53°40′N 89°16′E
- Parent range: Altai Mountains

Geology
- Rock type: Metamorphic rock

Abakan Range (Russian: Абаканский хребет) is a mountain range in Southwestern Siberia, located mainly in Khakassia, Russia: It is mostly covered by taiga, up to 1,500 m (4,900 ft), followed by mountainous tundra. The range also consists sparse areas of granite, gabbro, and diorite.

== Geography ==
The range has a length of 300 km (190 mi) and an elevation of up to 1,984 m (6,509 ft). It is at the southern border of the Kuznetsk Depression that contains the Kuznetsk Basin of Kemerovo Oblast. The range is part of the water divide between Abakan River, Tom River, and Lebed River. It is a Northern extension of Altai Mountains and Southern extension of Kuznetsk Alatau.

== Vegetation ==
The Abakan Range has forests of dark coniferous taiga, which include silver fir, spruce, and cedar, growing on its slopes up to an elevation of 1,700 m (5,577 ft). Higher than that, the mountains are covered in tundra.

== See also ==
- Geography of South-Central Siberia
