= Sayano-Shushenski Nature Reserve =

Nature reserve in Krasnoyarsk Krai, Russia

- Russian: Саяно-Шушенский заповедник (Also: Sayano-Shushensky)
- IUCN category Ia (strict nature reserve)
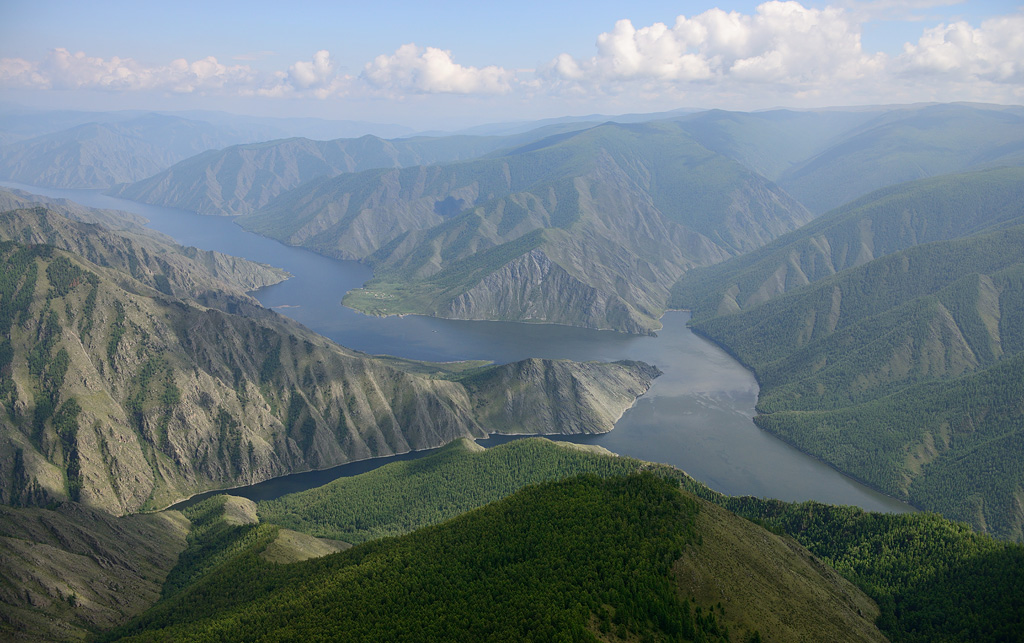
- Sayano-Shushenski Reserve, and Sayano-Shushensky Reservoir

- Location within Russia
- Location: Krasnoyarsk Krai
- Nearest city: Shushenskoye
- Coordinates: 52°7′44″N 91°47′34″E
- Area: 390,368 hectares (964,620 acres; 1,507 sq mi)
- Established: 1976
- Governing body: Ministry of Natural Resources and Environment (Russia)
- Website: https://www.sayanzapoved.ru/

Sayano-Shushenski Nature Reserve (Russian: Саяно-Шушенский заповедник) (also Sayano-Shushensky) is a Russian 'zapovednik' (strict ecological reserve) reserve in a remote area of the West Sayan Mountains of south Siberia. It is on the southern bank of the Yenisei River along the Sayano-Shushenskoye reservoir. The reserve thus protects a large section of the wooded, mountainous territory above the reservoir created by the Sayano-Shushenskaya Dam, the largest power plant in Russia. Both the reserve and the dam were established 1976, and a major purpose of the reserve besides conservation is the study of the ecological effects of a large reservoir on the local ecology. The reserve covers an area of 390,368 ha (1,507.22 sq mi). It is situated in the Shushensky District of Krasnoyarsk Krai.

== Topography ==
The Sayano-Shushenski Reserve covers mountainous terrain on the axial ridge of the western Sayan mountains, including the Khemchiksky Ridge (northern slope) and Kantegirsky range (eastern spurs). It is bounded on the north by the Yenisei River. Elevations range from 500 to 2735 meters.

== Climate and ecoregion ==
Sayano-Shushenski is located in the Sayan montane conifer forests ecoregion, an ecoregion that is at the mid-elevation levels of the Sayan Mountains, the highest mountains in Siberia. It is in a transition zone between the Siberian taiga to the north and the Mongolian steppe to the south. This ecoregion has high levels of biodiversity due to the meeting of ecological zones, the variations in altitude, and the variations in relief.

The climate of Sayano-Shushenski is Subarctic climate, without dry season (Köppen climate classification Subarctic climate (Dfc)). This climate is characterized by mild summers (only 1–3 months above 10 °C (50.0 °F)) and cold, snowy winters (coldest month below −3 °C (26.6 °F)). The Sayano Reserve experiences not only climate differences based on altitude, but across the line of the ranges: the north slope is wet (1000–1500 mm/year of precipitation), while the southern steppe side averages only 400 mm/year. The north slope may see 1.5 meters of snow while the southern sees 0.3 meters.

== Flora and fauna ==
The forests of the reserve vary by elevation and by proximity to the reservoir. The mid-level forests are mostly taiga fir and pine, with some zones of larch forests. The mountain steppe regions grade out to even shrubs-steppe and grassland. Fluctuations in the water level due to operations of the dam can be dramatic (up to 40 meters). This leads to plant zones that contain species that reflect the influence of human actions, and are a primary focus of scientists in the reserve. In the upper regions of the reservoir, the receding waters have produced broad floodplains.

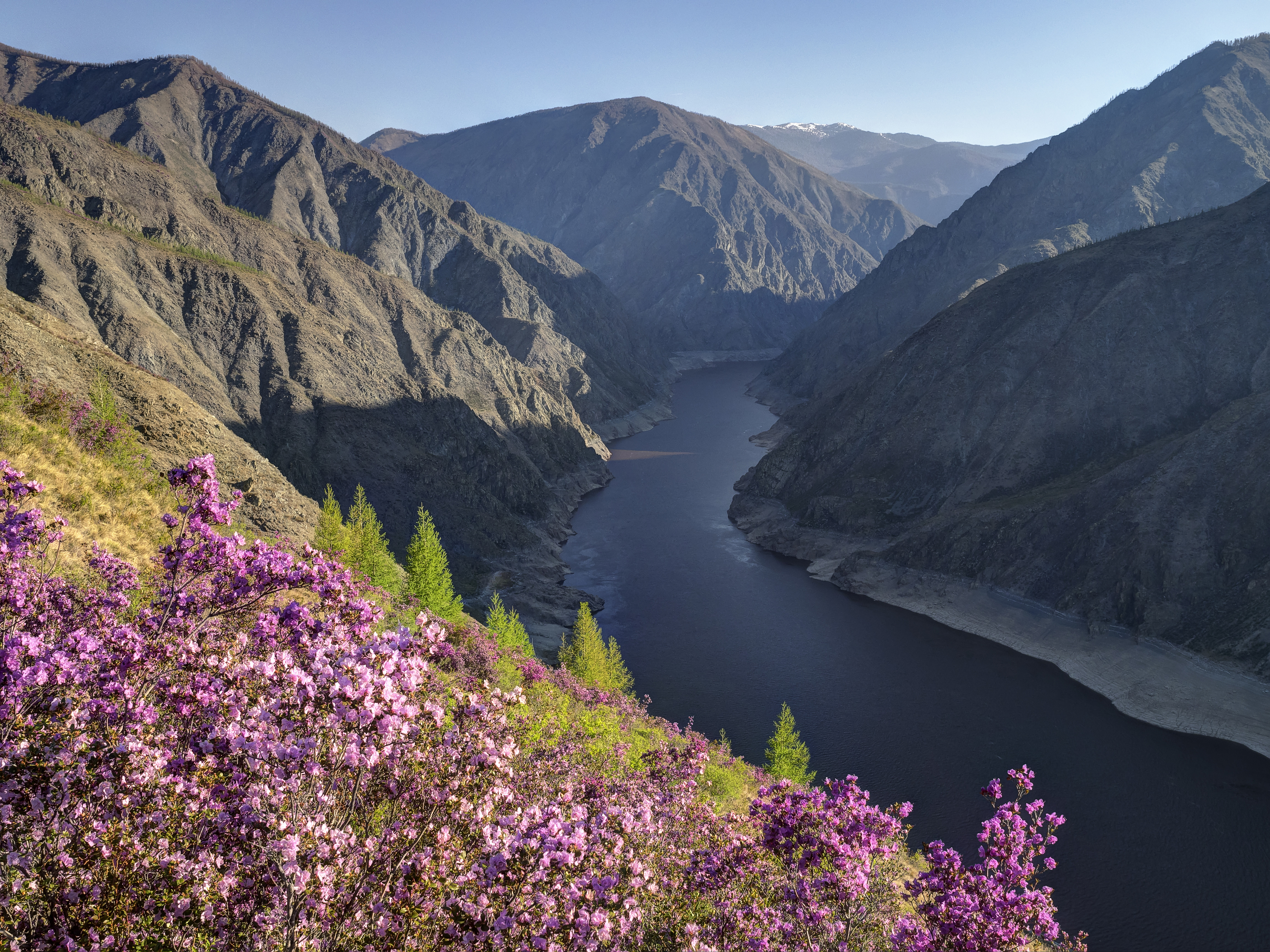
Yenisei River in the reserve. Note the banks of the river where water level fluctuates

The most common mammals in the reserve are those that are widespread in Siberia: sable, squirrel, elk, wolf, wolverine, lynx and others. In the upper levels of the mountains there are typical Arctic species: arctic shrews and reindeer. In steppe region are more Mongolian-representative species: Siberian mountain goat, Pallas's cat, long-tailed hamster and the grey marmot. There a small number of snow leopards in the reserve. Over 100 species of birds are recorded. Those representative of the Siberian taiga include the Eurasian nuthatch, blue nightingale, nightingale whistler, nutcracker, Himalayan Cuckoo, and grouse. The bearded partridge is typical of the rocky steppe areas, and birds of prey such as ospreys, falcons and eagles are common throughout. Reptiles include copperhead snakes and adders; amphibians are represented by the moor frog and common toad.

== Ecoeducation and access ==
As a strict nature reserve, the Sayano-Shushenski Reserve is mostly closed to the general public, although scientists and those with 'environmental education' purposes can make arrangements with park management for visits. The reserves maintains a nature museum that is open to the public, and there are two 'ecotourist' routes through the territory that are open to the public, but require these permits to be obtained in advance. The main office is in the city of Shushenskoye.

== See also ==
- List of Russian Nature Reserves (class 1a 'zapovedniks')
- National Parks of Russia
