= Kuznetsk Basin =

Geographic region in Russia

Coordinates: 55°21′16″N 86°5′19″E

The Kuznetsk Basin (Russian: Кузнецкий угольный бассейн, Кузбасс; often abbreviated as Kuzbass or Kuzbas) in southwestern Siberia, Russia, is one of the largest coal mining areas in Russia, covering an area of around 10,000 square miles (26,000 km^{2}). It lies in the Kuznetsk Depression between Tomsk and Novokuznetsk in the basin of the Tom River. From the south it borders the Abakan Range, from the west Salair Ridge, and Kuznetsk Alatau from the east.

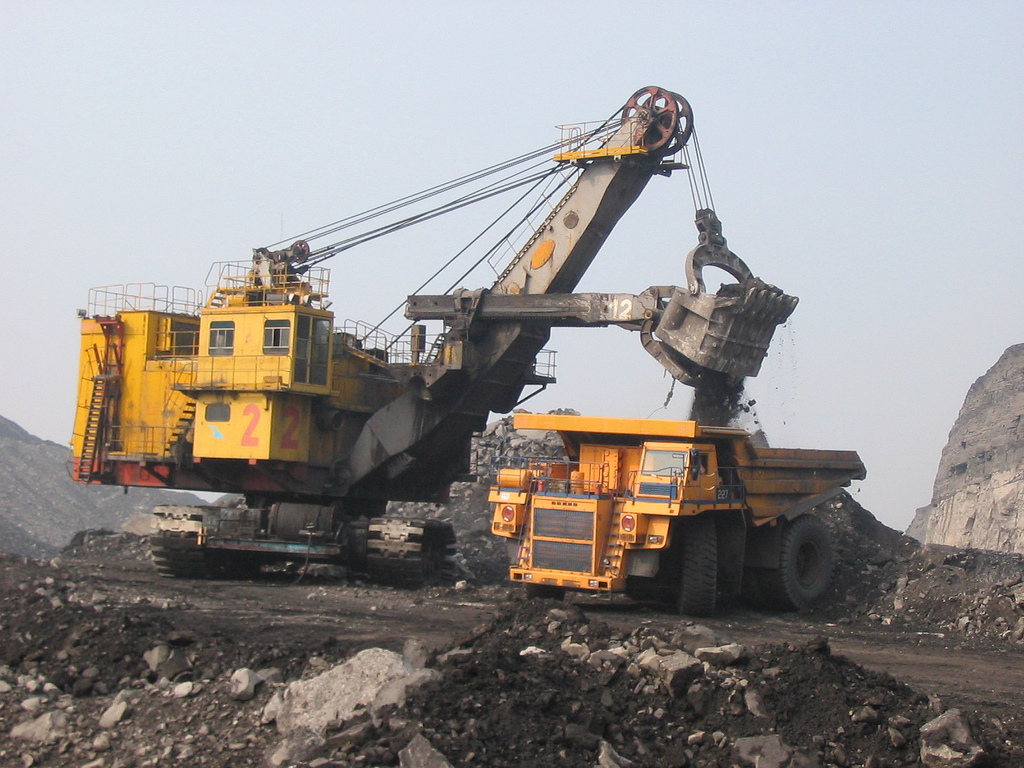
Mining in Mezhdurechensk.

It possesses some of the most extensive coal deposits anywhere in the world; coal-bearing seams extend over an area of 10,309 square miles (26,700 km^{2}) and reach to a depth of 5,905 feet (1,800 m). Overall coal deposits are estimated at 725 billion tonnes. The region's other industries, such as machine construction, chemicals and metallurgy, are based on coal mining.

== History ==
Coal deposits in the area were first discovered in 1721.

During the Soviet era, the Kuznetsk Basin was second only to the Donets Basin in terms of regional coal production. Iron smelting began there as early as 1697 and coal was discovered in 1721, although it was not systematically mined until 1851. The late-19th-century industrialisation of Russia prompted a rapid growth in the area's industries, which was further boosted by the completion of the Trans-Siberian Railway. Under Joseph Stalin's first five-year plan, the Ural-Kuznetsk industrial combine was formed in the early 1930s. It became a centre for the production of iron and steel, zinc, aluminium, machinery and chemicals, with raw materials and finished products being shipped to and from sites in the Kuzbas and Urals.

A series of coal miners' strikes in the late 1980s took place in the region. The strike resulted in the formation of the Kuzbass Soviet of Workers' Committees and the Kuzbass Workers' Union. The Union issued a manifesto which criticised the party bureaucracy, but also declared that they were still committed to socialism and rejected private property. The miners at first expelled members of the Democratic Union Party who supported capitalist reforms, though by 1990 the strength of pro-Communist factions in the strike had weakened and this categorical opposition to capitalism was no longer present. Yeltsin chose to support the Kuzbass Soviet and pledged to address their economic concerns if they supported him and his economic reforms, however at no point under Yelstin's presidency did he meet any of the promises made to the Kuzbass soviet.

Following the dissolution of the Soviet Union and the collapse of the planned economy, the region's industries faced a further crisis. Since then, however, its significance has grown. The Kuzbass now extracts ca. 60 percent of Russia's total coal production and is the main fuel and energy base for eastern Russia.

Administratively, the Kuznetsk Basin lies in Kemerovo Oblast with its capital in the city of Kemerovo. Other major cities in the area include Anzhero-Sudzhensk, Leninsk-Kuznetsky, Kiselyovsk, and Prokopyevsk.

== Pollution ==
The large amount of coal mining in the region resulted in significant pollution. In a report done by the Central Intelligence Agency, the region was said to be home of "environmental problems" which were "causing increasing deaths and genetic defects among babies". A study by the British Geological Survey found that "annual methane emissions into the atmosphere from Kuzbass coal mines amount to 1–2 billion cubic metres", with much of that coming from now abandoned mines.

== See also ==
- Coal in Russia
- Kuzbass Autonomous Industrial Colony
