= Chumysh =

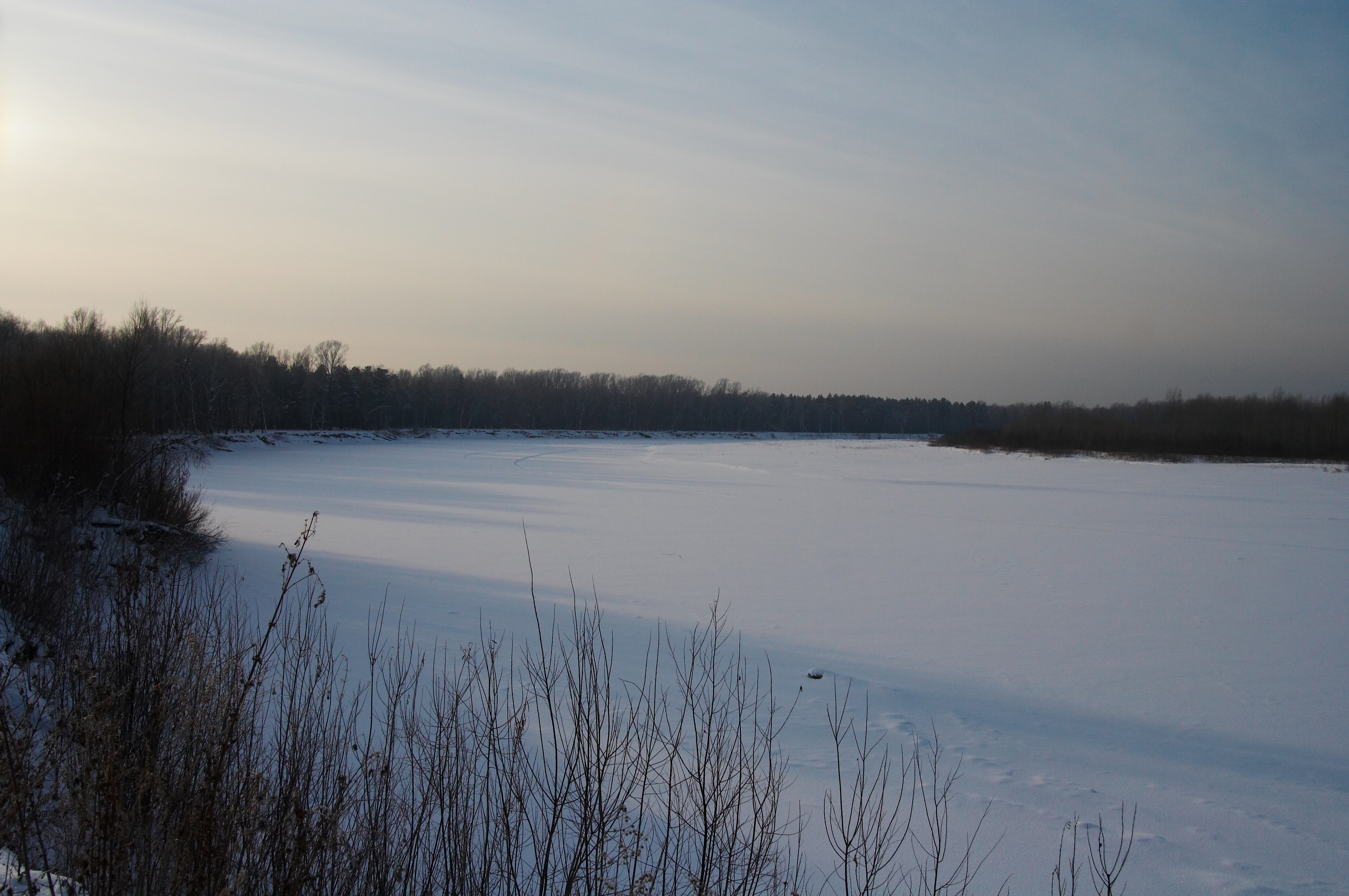
- The Chumysh under the ice cover just before the confluence with the Ob, Yazovo village, Altai Krai

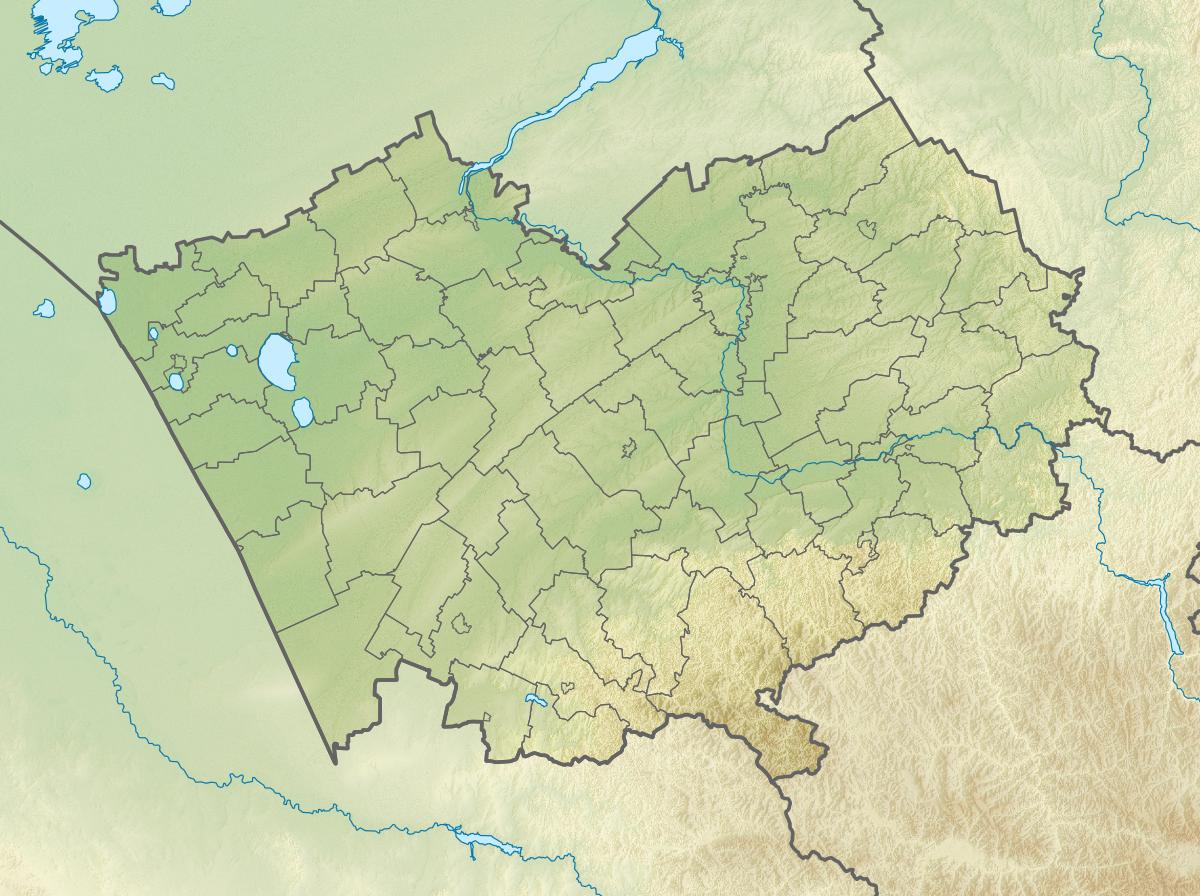
- Mouth location in Altai Krai, Russia

Location
- Country: Russia

Physical characteristics
- Mouth: Ob
  - coordinates: 53°32′25″N 83°10′04″E
- Length: 644 km (400 mi)
- Basin size: 23,900 km^{2} (9,200 sq mi)

Basin features
- Progression: Ob→ Kara Sea

The Chumysh (Russian: Чумыш) is a river in Russia, a right branch of the Ob River. It enters the Ob 88 kilometres (55 mi) downriver from Barnaul. The Chumysh begins at the confluence of the Kara-Chumysh and the Tom-Chumysh rivers in Kemerovo Oblast. The Chumysh is 644 kilometres (400 mi) long, and it drains a basin of 23,900 square kilometres (9,200 mi^{2}).

About 68 percent of its right-side basin is known as the Salair Ridge (Russian: Салаирский кряж) and the Pre-Salair plains.

== Main tributaries ==
=== Left ===
- Kara-Chumysh (Кара-Чумыш), length 173 kilometres (107 mi)
- Sary-Chumysh (Сары-Чумыш), length 98 kilometres (61 mi)
- Kashkaragaikha (Кашкарагаиха), length 84 kilometres (52 mi)
- Taraba (Тараба), length 70 kilometres (43 mi)
- Yama (Яма), length 67 kilometres (42 mi)
- Angurep (Ангуреп), length 48 kilometres (30 mi)

=== Right ===
- Tom-Chumysh (Томь-Чумыш), length 110 kilometres (68 mi)
- Uksunay (Уксунай), length 165 kilometres (103 mi)
- Alambay (Аламбай), length 140 kilometres (87 mi)
- Sungay (Сунгай), length 103 kilometres (64 mi)
- Talmenka (Тальменка), length 99 kilometres (62 mi)
- Kamenka (Каменка), length 78 kilometres (48 mi)
