= Salair Ridge =

Mountain range in Altai Krai, Russia

- Салаирский кряж
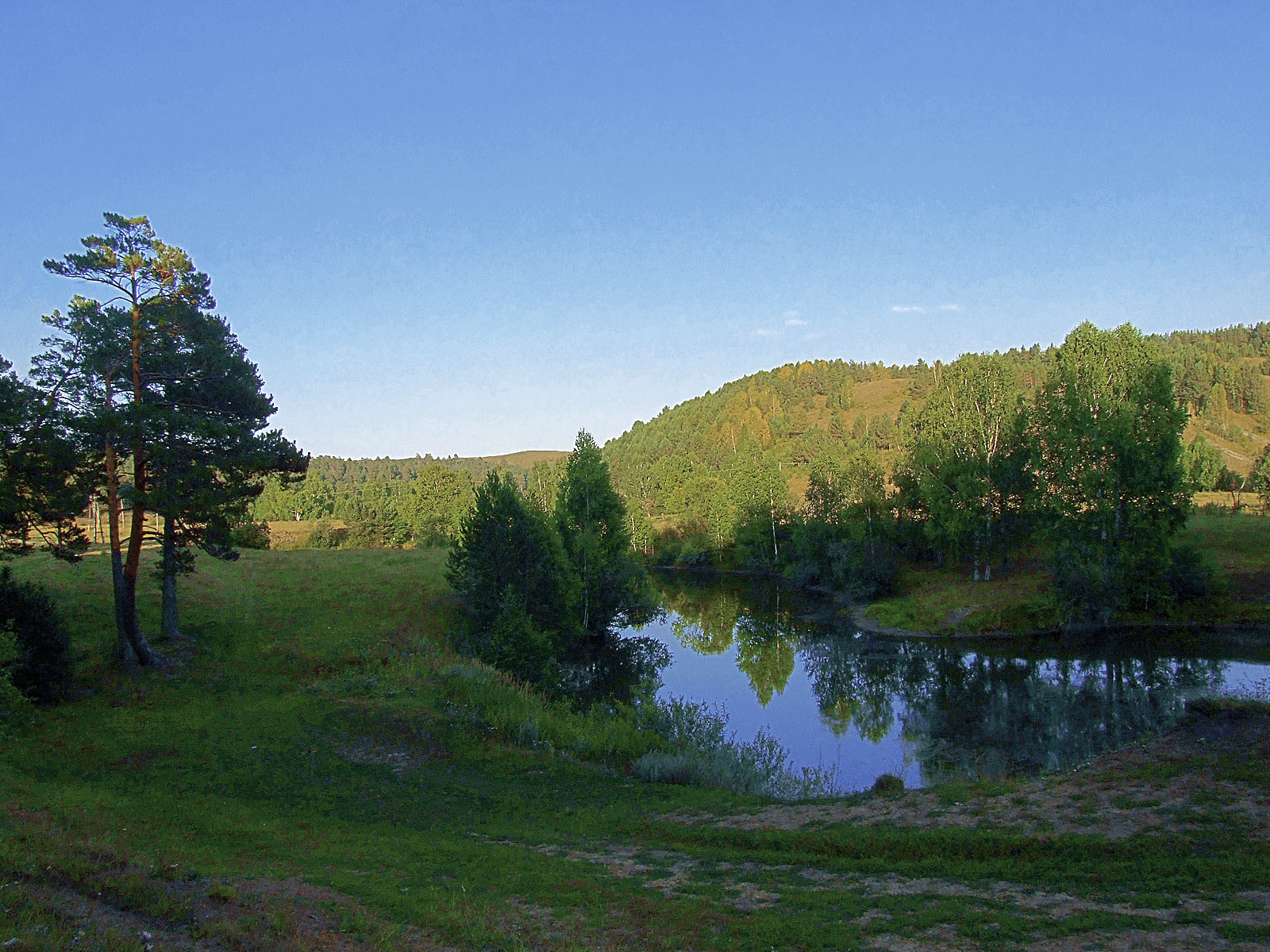
- View of the range

Highest point
- Peak: Kivda
- Elevation: 621 m (2,037 ft)
- Coordinates: 54°05′N 85°50′E

Dimensions
- Length: 300 km (190 mi) NW / SE
- Width: 30 km (19 mi) NE/ SW

Geography
- Location within Russia
- Location: Altai Krai, Kemerovo Oblast and Novosibirsk Oblast
- Parent range: Altai Mountains, South Siberian System

Geology
- Orogeny: Alpine orogeny
- Rock types: Granite, sandstone, limestone and tuff

Climbing
- Easiest route: from Novokuznetsk

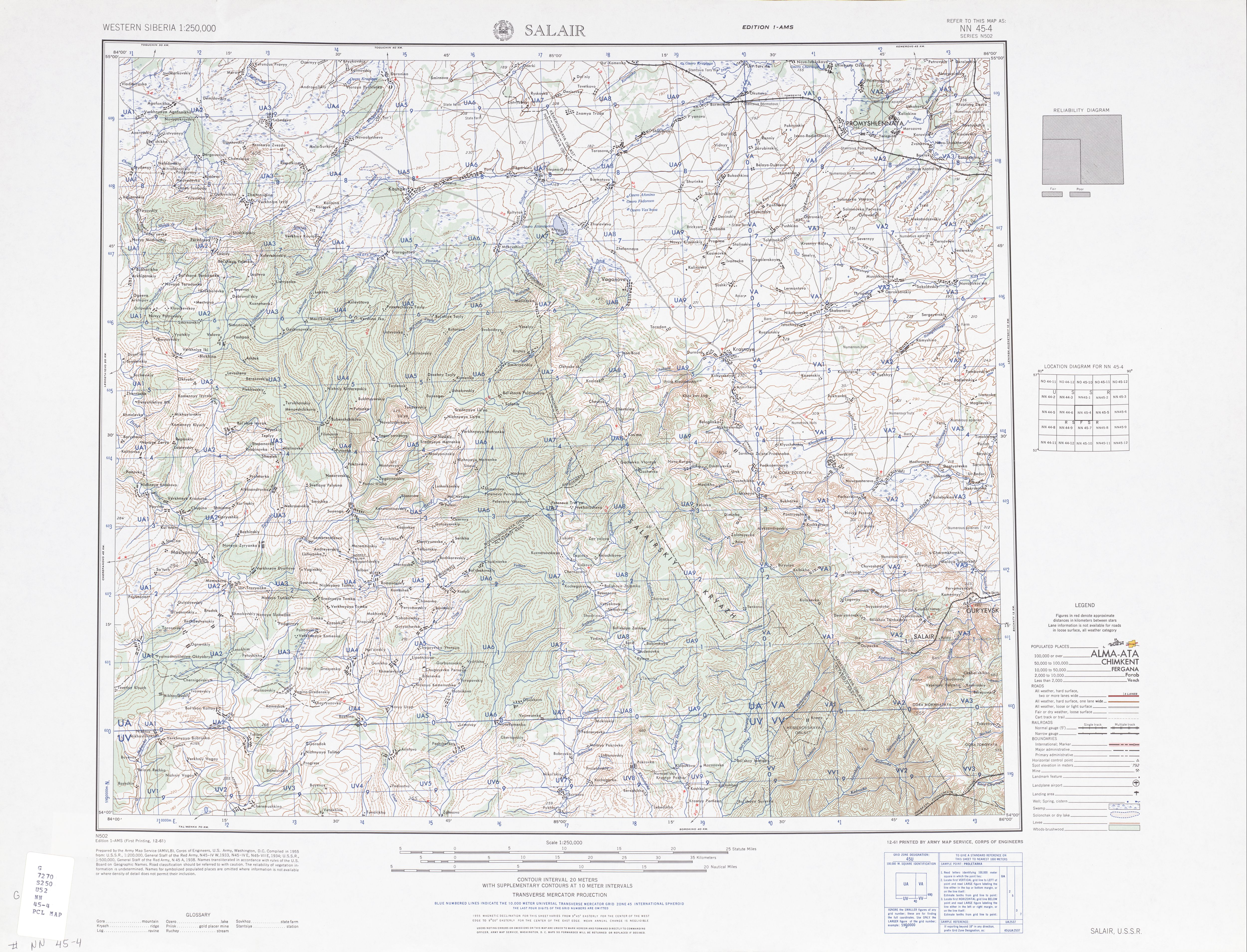
USSR map of Salair Ridge

Salair Ridge (pronounced sah-lah-EER; Russian: Салаирский кряж is a plateau-type highland in Altai Krai, Kemerovo Oblast and Novosibirsk Oblast, Russian Federation.

There are ski resorts in the mountains. The Salair National Park is a protected area in the western slopes.

== Geography ==
It is a low and eroded prolongation of the Altai Mountains in Southwestern Siberia and separates the Kuznetsk Depression from the Ob River Plain to the southwest, ending with the Bugotak Hills. Its main ridge is nearly parallel to that of the Kuznetsk Alatau. The ridge is some 300 kilometres (190 mi) in length and between 15 kilometres (9.3 mi) and 40 kilometres (25 mi) wide.

The mountains are rich in complex ores. The highest peak is Kivda (Russian: Кивда), at 621 metres (2,037 ft).

Major rivers include the Berd, Suenga, and Chumysh.

== See also ==
- Geography of South-Central Siberia
- South Siberian Mountains
