= Minusinsk Hollow =

Geographic region of Siberia

Minusinsk Basin
- Basin
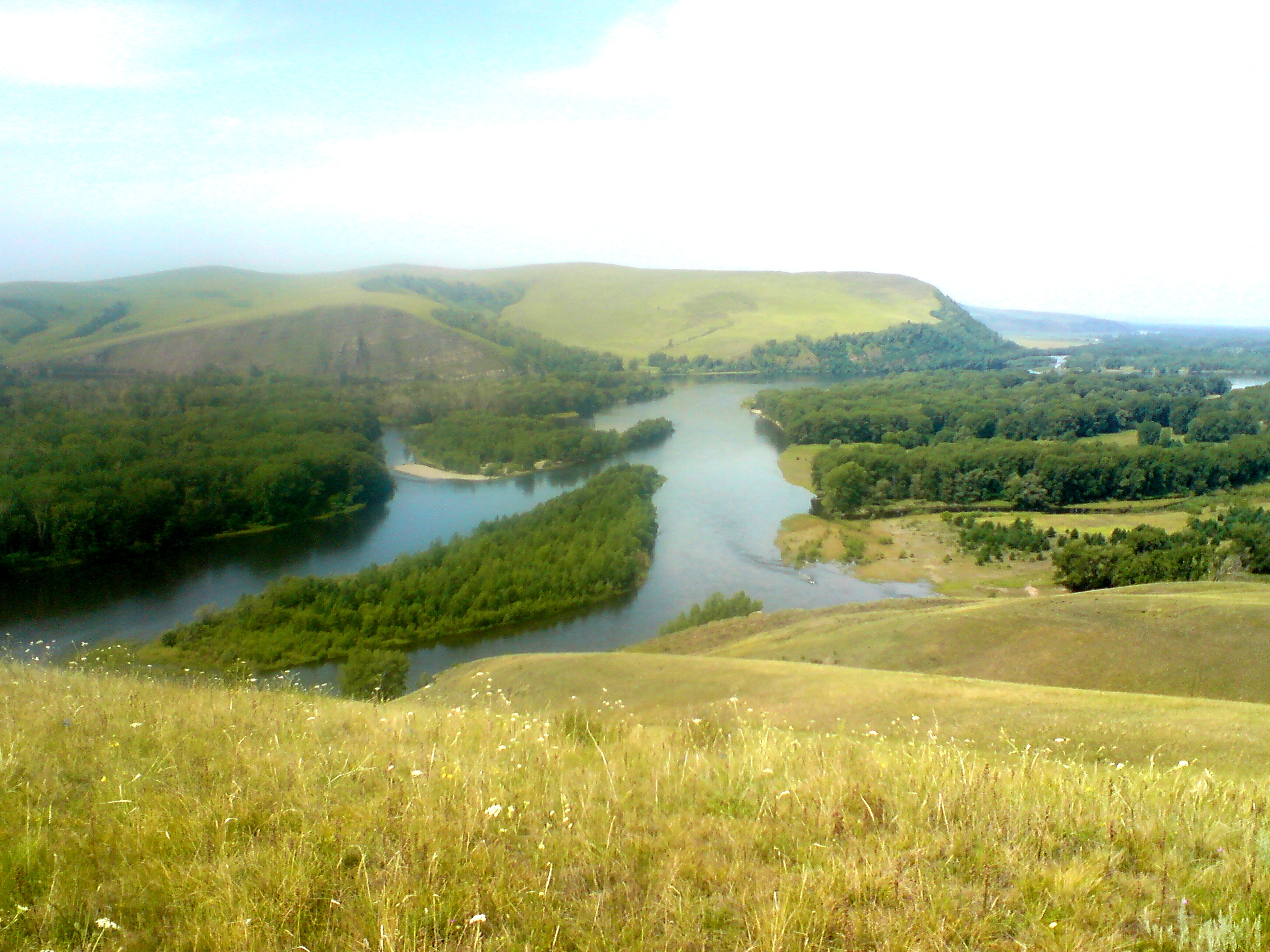
- Yenisey River

- Location within Continental Asia Location within Krasnoyarsk Krai Location within Russia
- Coordinates: 54°00′N 91°30′E

Minusinsk Basin or Khakass-Minusinsk Basin (Russian: Минусинская (Хакасско-Минусинская) котловина, Minusinskaya (Chakassko-Minusinskaya) kotlovina) is in Khakassia and Krasnoyarsk Krai, Russia located among mountains of South Siberia.

== Geography ==
It is bounded on the west by Kuznetsk Alatau, and east by the Sayan Mountains. See Geography of South-Central Siberia. Elevation varies between 200 and 700 m, constituting a plain with sparse hillocks and cut by valleys.

The Yenisey River and its major tributaries Abakan, Oia (Russian: Оя) and Tuba flow through the valley. Its major towns are Minusinsk and Abakan. The hollow has a large number of lakes, including saltwater ones. The depression is an important agricultural area; it also has coal deposits (Minusinsk Coal Basin).

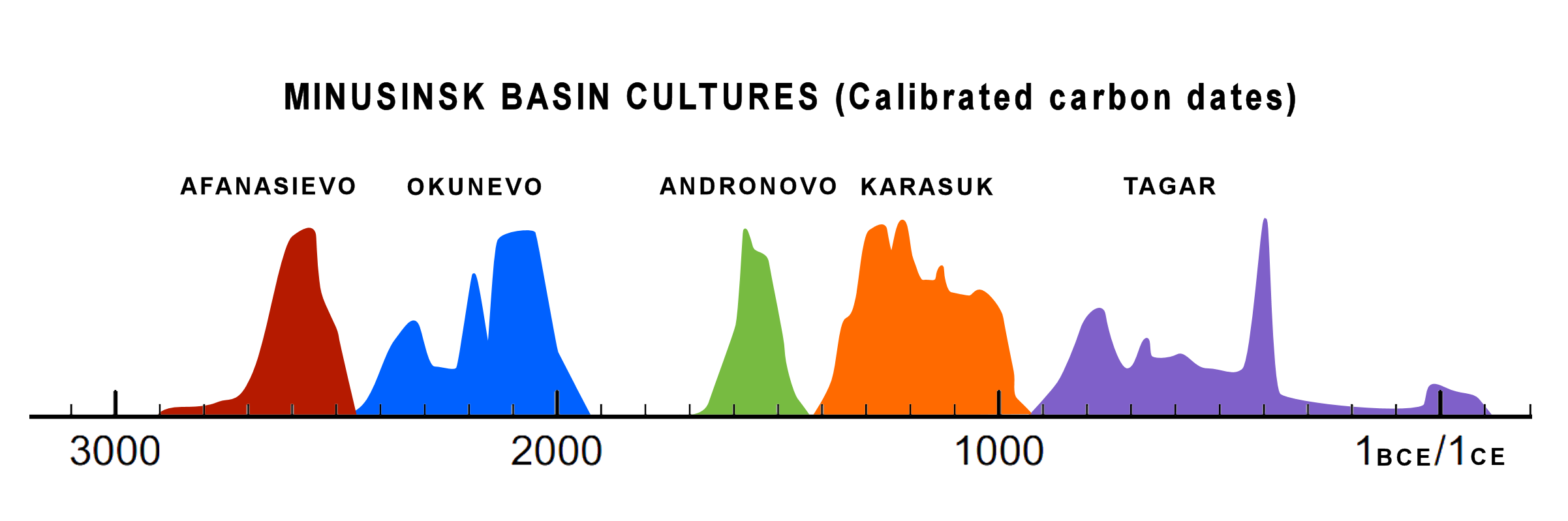
Minusinsk Basin early archaeological cultures.

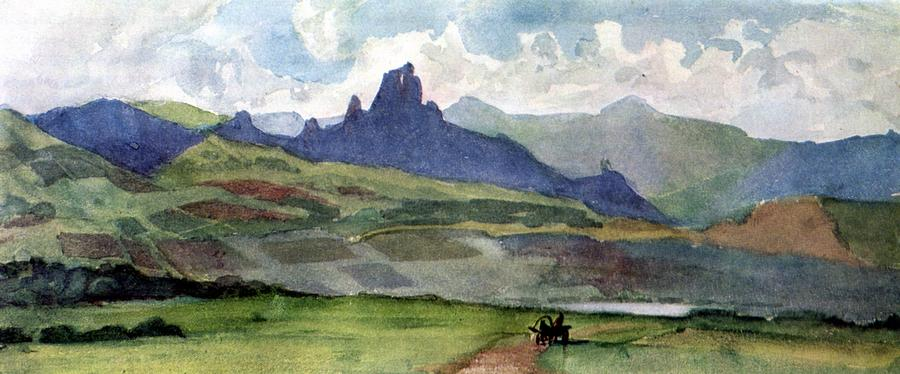
Minusinsk steppe. Painting by Vasily Surikov.

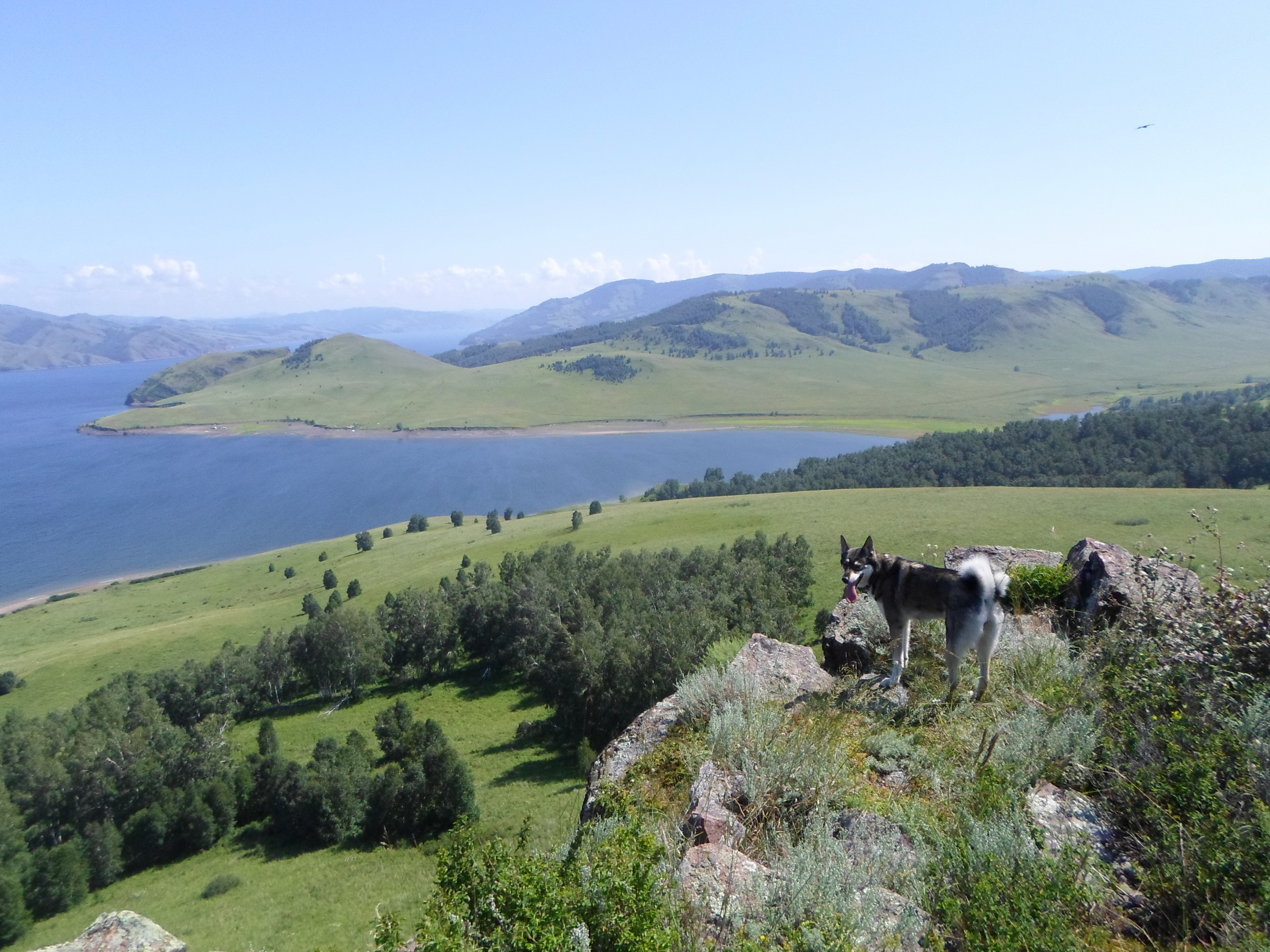
Gora Afanasieva mountain, type site of the Afanasievo culture, Minusinsk Basin.
