= Tannu-Ola mountains =

Central Asian mountain range

Tannu-Ola Mountains
- Таңды-Уула / Tañdı-Uula
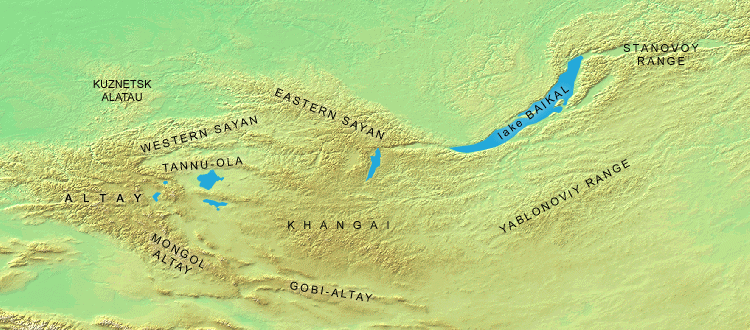

Highest point
- Peak: Unnamed
- Elevation: 3,061 m (10,043 ft)

Dimensions
- Length: 1,300 km (810 mi)

Geography
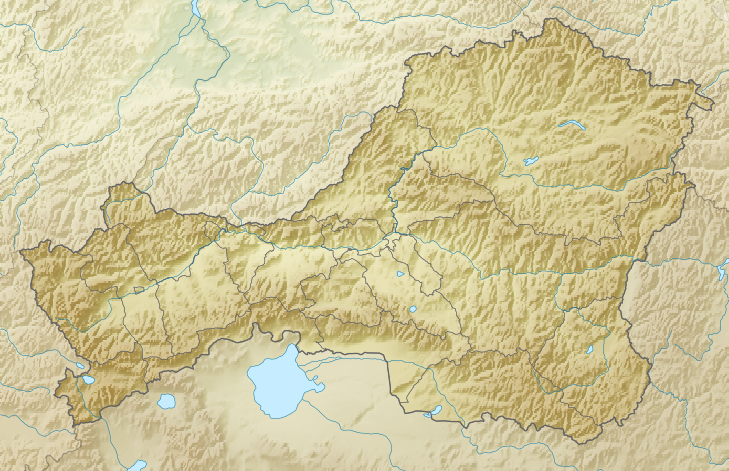
- Location within Tuva Republic
- Country: Russia
- Federal subject: Tuva
- Range coordinates: 51°04′12″N 92°23′25″E
- Parent range: South Siberian System

Geology
- Rock types: Sandstone; schist; Conglomerate (West); Granite (East); effusive rock (East)

The Tannu-Ola mountains (Note: Tuvan: Таңды-Уула, romanized: Tañdı-Uula, Uniform Turkic Alphabet: Taᶇdь-Uula, pronounced [tʰaŋˈtɯ ˈuːla]) or Tangdy-Uula mountains (Note: Mongolian: Тагнын нуруу, romanized: Tağnîn nurú, Mongolian pronunciation: [tʰaɢˈniŋ nʊˈrʊː], Russian: Танну-Ола, [tɐnˈnu ɐˈla]) are a mountain range in southern Siberia, in the Tuva Republic of Russia. It extends in an east–west direction and curves along the Mongolian border. Its highest peak reaches 3,061 m (10,043 ft). The Tannu-Ola mountains are mentioned in the 13th-century text The Secret History of the Mongols under the name "Tanglu mountains" (唐麓), and also in the JāmiʿAl-tawārīkh of Rashid-al-Din Hamadani (1247–1318) under the name "Toungat mountains" (تنغات). By the Qing dynasty the name has been changed to Tangnu (唐努) mountains, from which the modern name is derived. All names are probably rooted in the old Turkic word taŋ - "wonder, awe, wondrous."

== Geography ==
The northern slopes are part of the watershed of the Yenisei River, facing the western Sayan Mountains. The eastern end touches the large watershed of the Selenge River in Mongolia. The foothills of the southern slopes cross into Mongolian territory. They form the northern limits of a large basin of steppes that extends south to the Mongolian Altay Mountains and includes the salt lake Uvs Nuur. The western end is located near the northern Altay Mountains in the Russian Altai Republic.

== See also ==
- Tuva Depression
- Uvs Nuur Basin
- Ubsunur Hollow Biosphere Reserve
