= Kuznetsk Alatau =

Mountain range in Siberia

- Кузнецкий Алатау
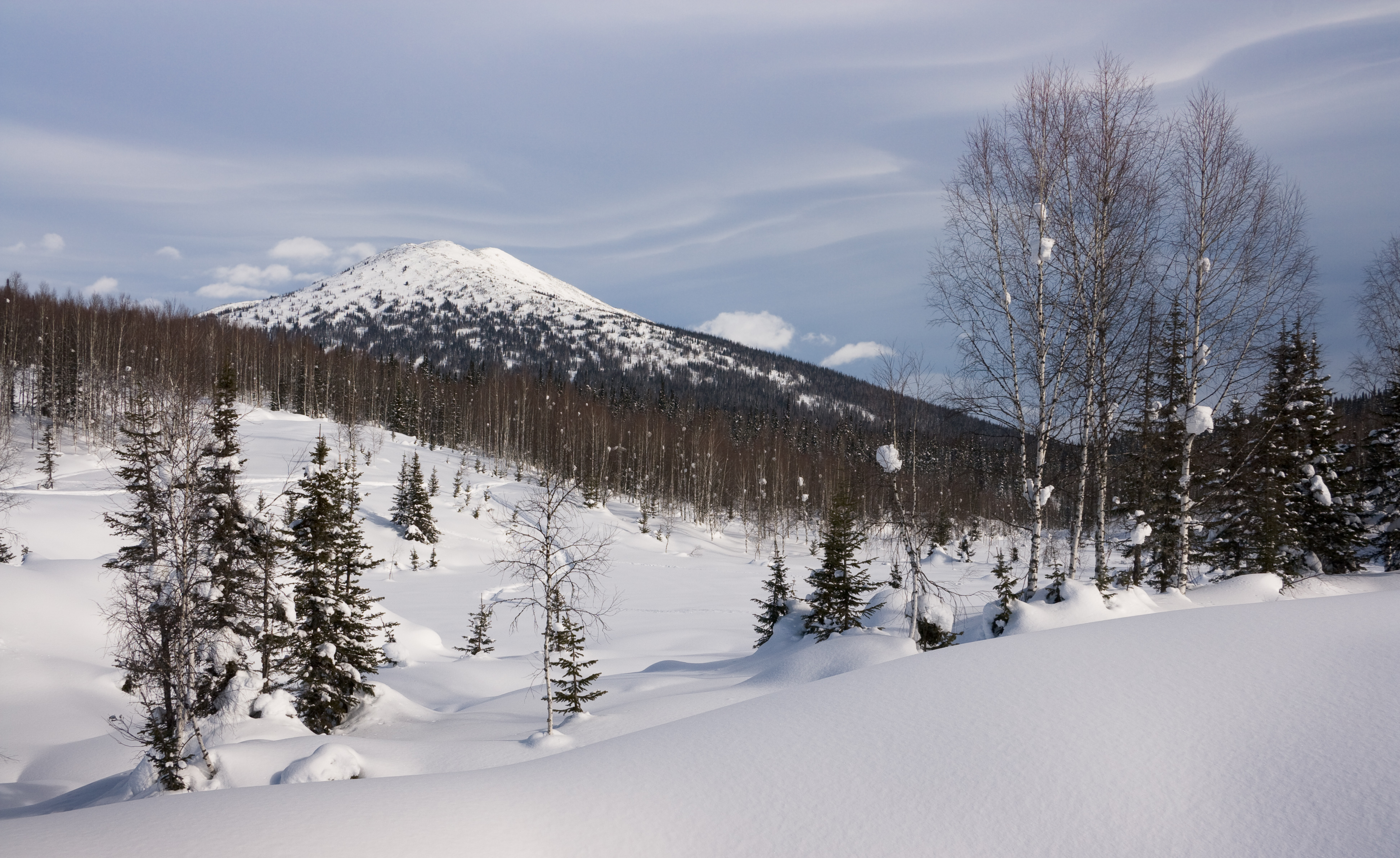

Highest point
- Peak: Staraya Krepost
- Elevation: 2,217 m (7,274 ft)
- Coordinates: 53°51′34″N 89°18′01″E

Dimensions
- Length: 300 km (190 mi) SW / NE
- Width: 150 km (93 mi)

Geography
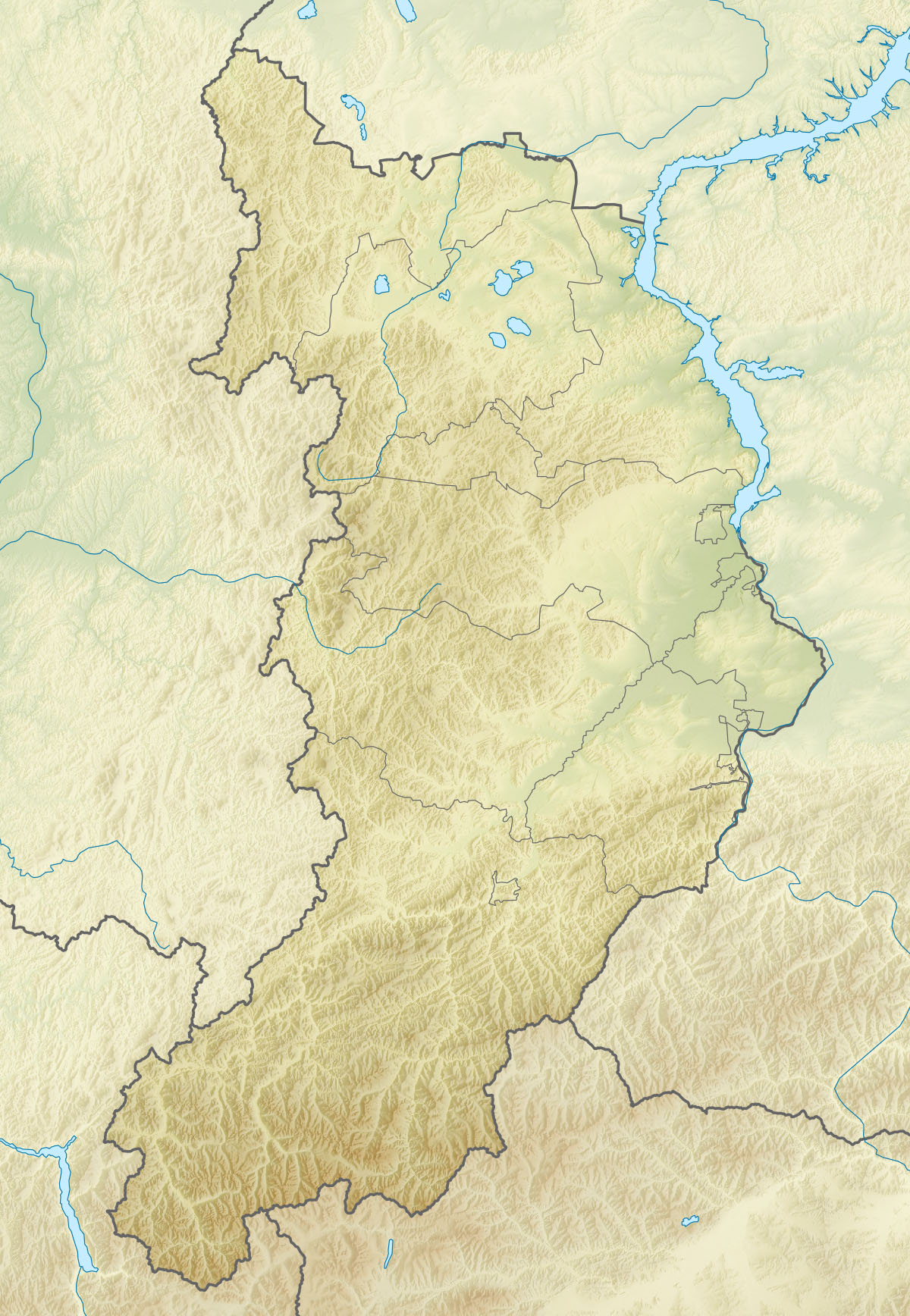
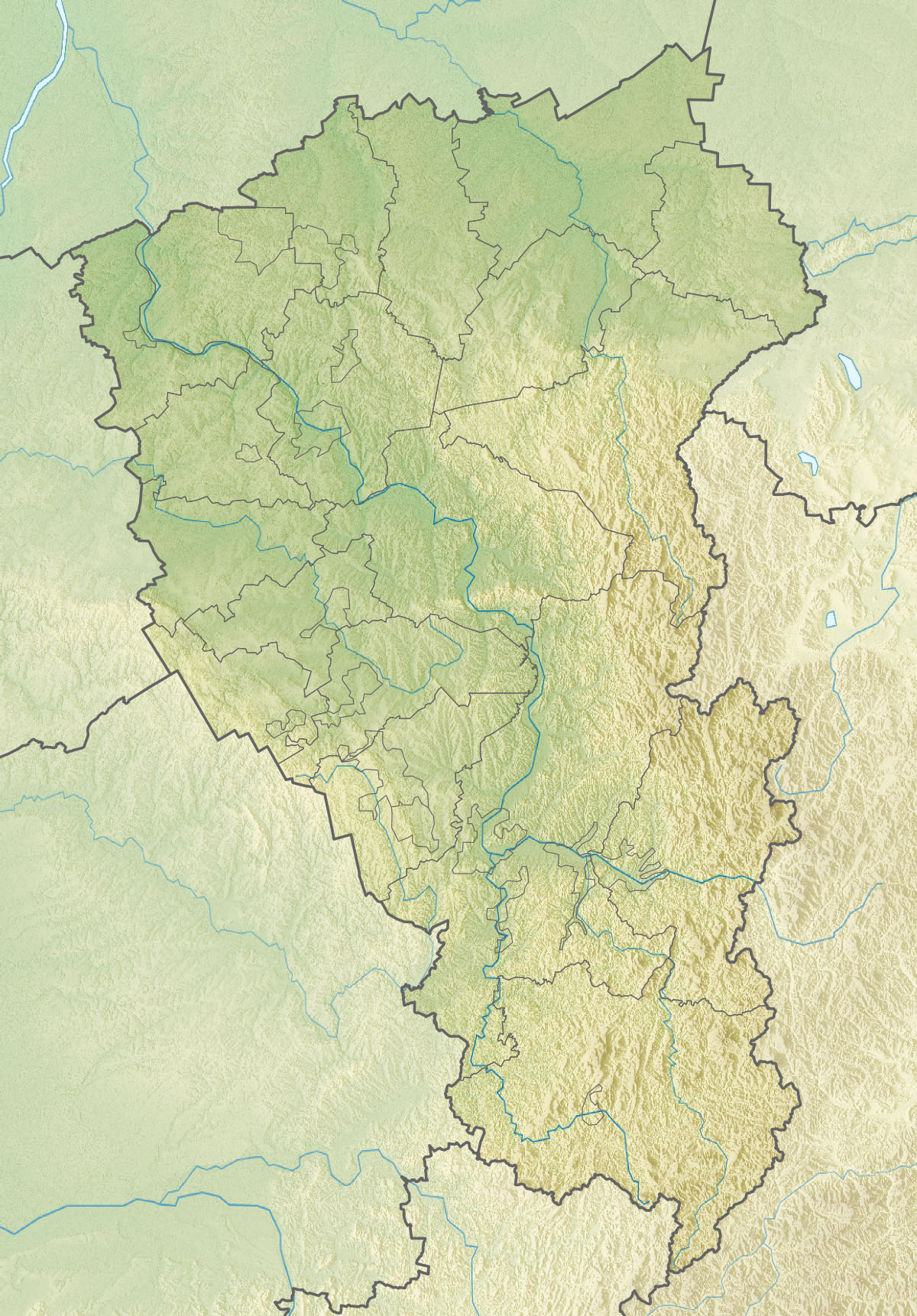
- Location within Khakassia Location within Kemerovo Oblast Location within Russia
- Country: Russia
- Federal subject: Khakassia; Kemerovo Oblast
- Range coordinates: 53°45′N 89°15′E
- Parent range: Altai/Sayan; South Siberian System

Geology
- Orogeny: Alpine orogeny
- Rock age(s): Proterozoic, Lower Paleozoic
- Rock type(s): Gabbro, diorite, granite and syenite intrusive rocks

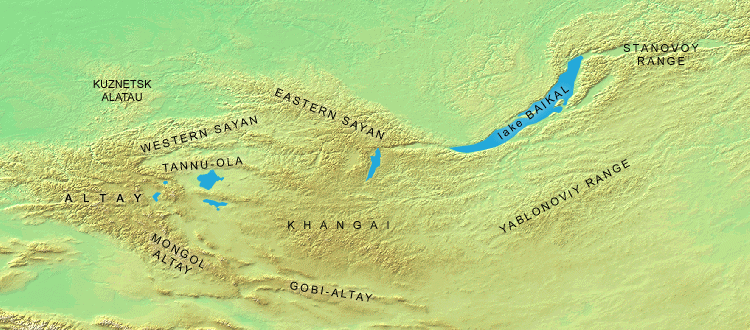
The Kuznetsk Alatau range

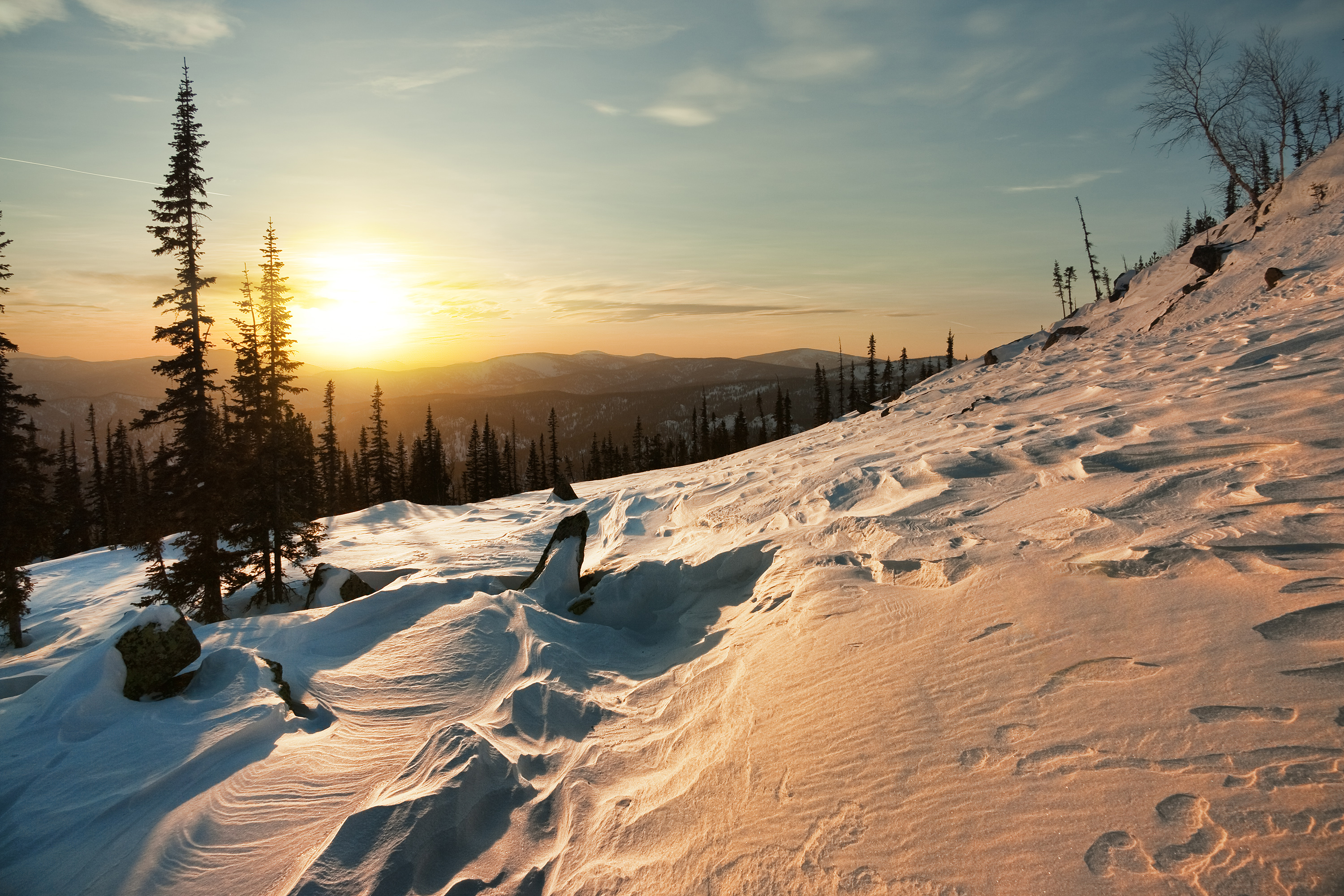
Sunset in the range

Kuznetsk Alatau (Russian: Кузнецкий Алатау) is a mountain range in southern Siberia, Russia. The range rises in the Altai-Sayan region of the South Siberian Mountains, northwest of Mongolia. The Siberian Railway skirts the northern limit of the range.

== Geography ==
The Kuznetsk Alatau consists of several ridges of medium height stretching for about 300 kilometres (186 mi) between the Kuznetsk Depression and the Minusinsk Depression. The highest peak is 2,217 metres (7,274 ft) high Staraya Krepost. Another important peak is 2,178 metres (7,146 ft) high Verkhny Zub. The Abakan Range is at the southern limit and to the north the range descends gradually to the West Siberian Plain. To the east lies the basin of the Yenisei. The mountains have generally a smooth outline with rather steep western slopes and gentler eastern ones.

The range is composed mainly of metamorphic rocks rich in iron, manganese, nephelines, and gold.

== Flora ==
The Siberian fir overwhelmingly predominates in the forest belt except for its upper part where, at the tree line (1300–1900 m), the siberian pine becomes dominant. The highlands are occupied mostly by vast large-stoned screes, and also by patches of subalpine meadows and, on some southern mountain massifs, of bushy, lichen and moss tundras. The basin of the Kondoma River in Gornaya Shoriya is remarkable for the Siberian lime-tree woods which are thought to be the relics of a pre-Pleistocene nemoral vegetation of Siberia. All over the upland, the forest openings are occupied by long forb forest meadows.

== See also ==
- Aeroflot Flight 593, which crashed in the Kuznetsk Alatau
- Kuznetsk Alatau Nature Reserve
- Geography of South-Central Siberia
