= Chebaki (Khakassia) =

Chebaki (Khakassia) Чебаки (Хакасия)
- village

Other transcription(s)
  - Khakass: Чабах аалы
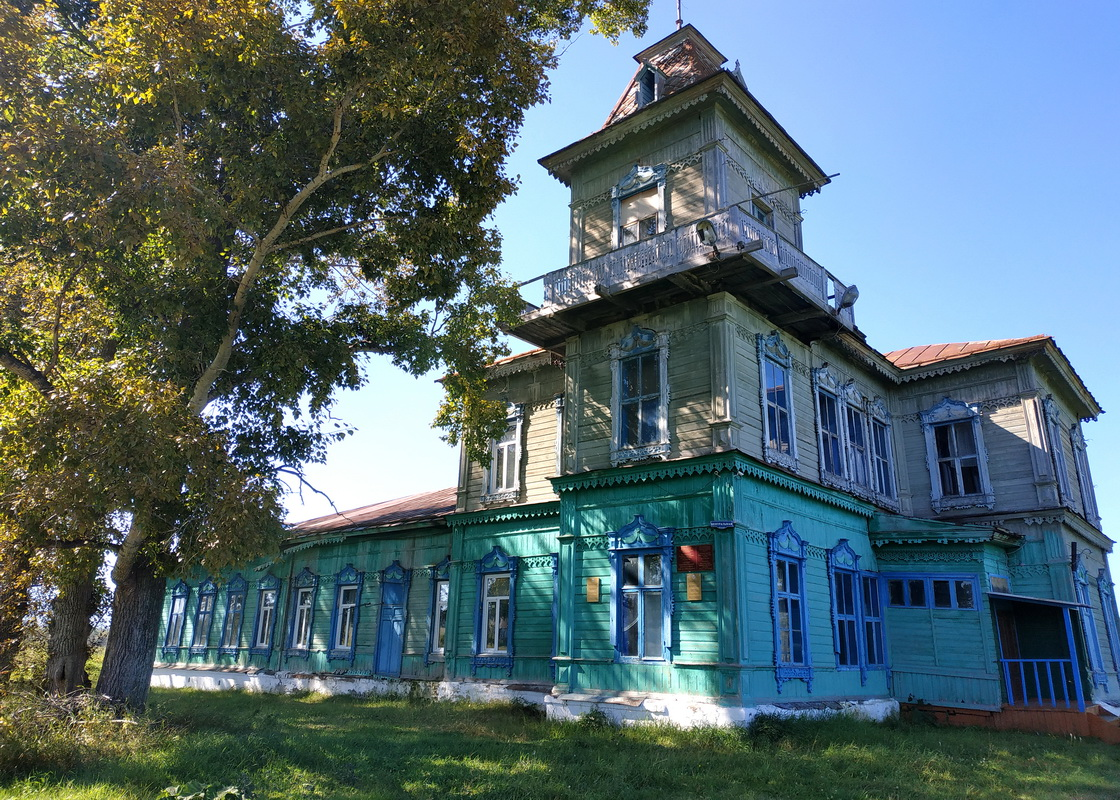
- Estate of the gold miner K.I. Ivanitsky
- Interactive map of Chebaki (Khakassia)
- Location of Chebaki (Khakassia) Chebaki (Khakassia) (Khakassia)
- Coordinates: 54°33′46.7″N 89°13′09.1″E
- Country: Russia
- Federal subject: Khakassia
- Administrative district: Shirinsky
- Selsoviet: Chernoozersky selsovet
- Founded: 1815, XIX century

Population (2010 Census)
  - Total: 61
  - Estimate (2010): 61 (0%)
- Time zone: UTC+7 (MSK+4)
- Postal code: 655212
- Dialing code: +7 49669
- OKTMO ID: 95635460121

Chebaki (Russian: Чебаки, Khakass: Чабах аалы, Çabax aalı) is a village in the Shirinsky District of Khakassia, Russian Federation.

== Geography ==
It is on the banks of the Cherny Iyus river, 80 kilometers northwest of the regional center of the village of Shira, as well as the railway station.

The nearby mountain Krestovka is 912 meters tall. The nearest south ridge (called Znamenitovskiye Gol'tsy) is 1446m. The stream bed Tserkovnyy and the freshwater lakes Chernoye and Reyngol are also in the area.

The left bank of the Yenisei part of the Minusinsk basin, belong to the geographic site of Yenisei Siberia.

The surrounding relief is varied along with areas almost flat, both isolated hills and ridges of hills or spurs of the surrounding mountains with steep slopes, narrow valleys and intermountain depressions. The lowlands lie at an altitude of 300 meters above sea level, with heights reaching 900 meters. The climate is sharply continental.

The following species, characteristic of the southern steppe regions, find here the northern limit of their habitat: Ardea cinerea (Grey heron), Nyroca ferina (Common pochard), Tadorna tadorna (Common shelduck), Recurvirostra avoceta (Pied avocet), Totanus totanus (common redshank), Sterna hirundo minussensis, Upupa epops (Eurasian hoopoe), Pyrrhocorax pyrrhocorax (Red-billed chough), Otocoris brandti, Otocoris brandti Montana, Calandrella brachydactyla (Greater short-toed lark), and Locustrella naevia mongolica.

From among the species of adjacent Mongolia, Cygopsis cygnoides (Swan geese) penetrate here, along with Otis dybowskii (Great bustard), Emberiza godlewskii (Godlewski's bunting), and Perdix daureca (Daurian partridge).

Acrocephlus ogricola comes here from the west, from neighboring Altai, along with Phylloscopus tristis fulvescens.

== Toponym and etymology ==
The village name comes from the name of the khakas Chebak Serenev of Chebakinsky ulus / Chebakevsky ulus / Chebak aal, founded in 1790.

Khakas: Чабаға, romanized: Chabaga, Chabaqa, Chabakha, lit. 'young horse from 1 to 2 years old'.

Chebak, or Siberian roach (lat. Rutilus rutilus lacustris) is a subspecies of roach, a ray-finned fish from the carp family, common in Siberia and the Urals.

A chebak is a fur hat with earmuffs, ties, and nape. It been known since the 18th century in the Yenisei and Tobolsk provinces as winter headdress worn by married women. It is a spherical hat with headphones and a long back blade, called the tail. (Teleut) čаbаk is a tall women's hat.

Chebaks can be used as a kind of scraper, in mining.

In 1893 the name of the settlement was the Village of Pokrovskoe (Chebaki), Yenisei Province, Achinsk District, Kizyl Administration. It was named Pokrovskoe after the Pokrova Bogoroditsy church which was built at the expense of the gold miner Z. M. Tsybulsky (1867, nowadays unpreserved).

In reports for 1893, the Orthodox priest Matvey Tyzhnov from Pokrovskoe (Chebaki) mentioned a sacred object, the embodiment of the spirit of fire, Khakas: Чалбах Tös, romanized: Chalbach Tyos, lit. 'Wide or Extensive Spirit' and the rituals of their veneration in connection of shaman tradition and spiritual life of the Khakass. Also Khakas: Чалбах, romanized: Chalbach, lit. 'Flat or Flat Surface', like in Khakas: Чалбах сагыт, romanized: Chalbakh sagyt, lit. 'flat hill, flat mountain' and Khakas: Чалбах, romanized: Chalbakh, lit. 'Flatbread', Khakas: Чайаан – Чалбах, romanized: Chayaan – Chalbakh, lit. 'Universe or Creator', Khakas: Чайаан – Чалбах(ғы), romanized: Chir – Chalbakh(gy), lit. 'Earth, Universe, Planet, World'.

== History ==
The territory belonged to the Siberia Governorate (until 1779), the Kolyvan Oblast (1779–1783), the Kolyvan Governorate (1783–1796), the Tobolsk Governorate (1796–1804), the Tomsk Governorate (1804–1822), Achinsk-Minusinsk Mining Okrug (Minusinsk Okrug 1822–1898, Minusinsk Uezd 1898–1925) of Yeniseysk Governorate (1822–1925).

Founded in the 19th century, Chebaki was part of the Yeniseysk Governorate (1822 -1925), as an establishment of gold miners. It was the residence of the gold miners Z. M. Tsibulsky and his cousin-nephew and heir K. I. Ivanitsky.

In 1867 Pokrova Bogoroditsy church became part of orthodox parishes of the Yenisei Governorate, Achinsk uezd, Uzhur volost.

The parish was formed on the territory of the Kizyl Inorodtsy volost of the Achinsk uezd. It included 38 uluses.

On 24 January 1888, a school was opened at the Pokrova Bogoroditsy church.

The Brotherhood at the Krasnoyarsk Cathedral in the Name of the Nativity of the Blessed Virgin Mary from 1894 began to supply the libraries of church parochial schools with books for out-of-class reading. In missionary reports of that time, the local population was described as "inorodtsy" and their customs or superstitions and their rituals and believes were different.

For the literate population, readings with light paintings in the parish church schools of the diocese were arranged (2 sciopticons and 60 paintings in each district of the diocese). In 1897, a total of 10 sciopticons (magic lanterns) and 600 paintings on glass were ordered from the Moscow manufacturer Swiss citizen Theodor Schwabe, a physico-optical mechanic. For the timely exchange of pictures between schools of neighboring districts, a timetable for the movement of the sciopticons (magic lanterns) and a light pictures were published in the yearly gazette Eparkhalnye Vedomosty.

In the Minusinsk district in the Chebakovsky-Pokrovsky parish with a non-Russian population on 1 August 1897, a seminary student Pavel Sukhovsky was ordained. Only 17 boys and 1 girl, of whom 10 were non-Russian, studied at the Pokrovsky parish school, while more kinds were attending school; for a total adult parish population of 2288 people in 1897, it was quite a small amount.

In 1912 a one-class ministerial school opened and in 1916 school already enrolled 80 boys and 40 girls, the school was in excellent condition and respected by the population.

In 1916 in the description of the Chebakovsky-Pokrovsky parish:

All this area, it must be said, is one of the richest areas of the Achinsk district: in the mountains, gold mines, valleys – give excellent harvests of bread and herbs, the surrounding forests abound with animals, and the river and lakes – with fish. This is one of the richest parishes of the Yenisei diocese. For the beauty of nature and healthy terrain, Chebaki are called "Siberian Switzerland".

— The Yenisei Church-Historical-Archaeological Society, A brief description of the parishes of the Yenisei diocese, Chebakovsky-Pokrovsky parish

From 1924 to 1933 the village of Chebaki is the administrative center of the Chebakovsky District, included 24 village and town councils.

In the spring of 1924, a reading room was opened in the village of Chebaki in the club's premises. The club included a political club, drama club, music club, and club for the study of the charter of the VSKSM. A paramedical station in Chebaki had two employees, a paramedic and a midwife, provided only outpatient care. There were no medicines in the first-aid post; there was only one damaged thermometer and two old tweezers.

In 1926 Chebaki near the Ivanovka River (probably a tributary stream of Black Iyus River) already there is a school, a district executive committee, a credit partnership, a shop, a hospital, a library.

In 1933, the center of the Chebaki District of the West Siberian Krai was moved to the village of Shira, Russia.

== Population ==
The earliest information about the village was found in the document of 1864, in lists of settlements of the Achinsk district, plot 2 N295 settlement – ulus (state) Chebakinsky (Chebak aly). The distance from the district town of Achinsk is 240 versts. The number of households is 31, and the number of inhabitants is 114 male, 98 female.

Population size
1864	1893	1901	1907	1911	1917	1925	1926	1924–1933	2002	2004	2010	2015
↗204	↗417	↗498	↗681	↗858	↗1238	↗1185	↗1372	↗1661	↘95	↘78	↘61	↘45

Many Chebaki residents fought and died during the First World War 1914–1918, Russian Civil War 1918–1921, Repressions, Second World War 1941–1945.

In the village of Chebaki there is the largest mass grave, with over 170 buried, of the people deceased on the Eastern Front of the Russian Civil War by Kolchac Army or policemen in the taiga or on the roads and buried where they died, later reburied in a mass grave in the rural square of the village of Chebaki in 1921. There are 75 miners of the Kommunar goldmine (former Bogomdarovanny goldmine) in a mass grave. On the first obelisk was the text "To the fighters who fell for the cause of the revolution of 1917–1920", the later text on the obelisk says, "Memorial to Civil War Heroes".

In 2004 the number of households was 34, the population was 78 people, including Russians, Khakasses (30%) etc.

== Notable natives and people ==
- Tsibulsky Zakhary Matveyevich was a merchant of the first guild, gold miner, and philanthropist. Donated 200 thousand rubles to complete the cathedral in Tomsk, and 200 thousand rubles for the Imperial Tomsk University, the first university in Siberia, under construction in Tomsk at that time.

The founder of the sanatorium business in the Yenisei province in 1873, he came up with the idea to organize a resort at nearby Lake Shira, after he experienced the healing properties of the salt lake and then made an attempt to study them. Tsibulsky build his summer residence at Chebaki, later the house became the property of Ivanitsky:

In the summer, he usually lived in his luxurious dacha, built not far from the taiga foreign village of Chebaki. At this dacha, its owner built a rather spacious church, where spiritual parables and a choir of singers were kept. The dacha itself was a large manor's house, with a spacious dance hall, a billiard room and all the manor's amenities. The house consisted of a fairly decent orchestra of musicians. On the dacha's estate there was a beautiful garden with greenhouses, in which several perfectly ripe oranges were grown by Christmas. On Christmas holidays, the Tsybulskys usually came from Tomsk to Chebaki, to their dacha; and then these oranges grown in greenhouses were then served at the table, the owners treated themselves, and treated guests who came to the Tsybulskys on Christmas visits. According to clerical reports, the maintenance of Tsybulsky's dacha cost him 40 thousand rubles annually. This dacha also served as the gold-mining residence of Tsybulsky, who had a number of mines in the Achinsk-Minusinsk region.

— Kulaev IV, Under a lucky star Notes of a Russian businessman. 1875–1930, Tsybulsky and Ivanitsky

- Ivanitsky K. I. the gold miner. After the death of Tsybulsky, his affairs and property passed to I.M. Ivanitsky, and after the death of the latter – to his son Konstantin Ivanovich, who thus became the owner of a large hereditary property. The Russian revolution forced K.I. Ivanitsky to flee to Manchuria, to Harbin:

When he left his gold-mining residence in Chebaki, he buried about 6 poods of gold in the ground. The place where the gold was hidden was 20 versts from Chebakov; Some Soviet agents in Harbin persuaded the Ivanitskys to hand over the gold they had hidden to the Soviet government. (it seems that this happened in 1930, I don't remember the exact date). There, on instructions, the gold was dug up and handed over to representatives of the Soviet authorities. This operation gave the Ivanitsky such financial results: half the price agreed namely 50 thousand yen, and the second half was paid in Tomsk to Ivanitsky's sisters.

— Kulaev IV, Notes of K.I. Ivanitsky, a Russian businessman. 1875–1930, K.I. Ivanitsky

- Zertsalov, Gennady Ivanovich (1940–2021) Soviet party leader, first secretary of the Kazan City Committee of the CPSU, chairman of the Kazan City Council of People's Deputies (1990–1991).

== Economy ==
In 1917 in a data description the presence of consumer society in the village was mentioned, and the number of farm animals was noted: 737 horses, 571 working horses, 76 foals; 99 cattle, 448 dairy cows, 258 calves; 1080 sheep and goats, and 104 pigs and piglets. The number of farms without arable land was 107. The land utilized for growing underground crops was 281.5 acres. Winter rye was 11 dessiatin; Jaritsy (spring wheat or spring rye) was 64 dessiatin. Oats were 78.4 dessiatin. All other types of grain were 70.2 dessiatin. The convertible husbandry area ws 63.1 dessiatin, and the area of meadow or hay lots is 1430 dessiatin.

Currently only the Berendey farm and the Praskovya Wellness Phytocentre are operating.

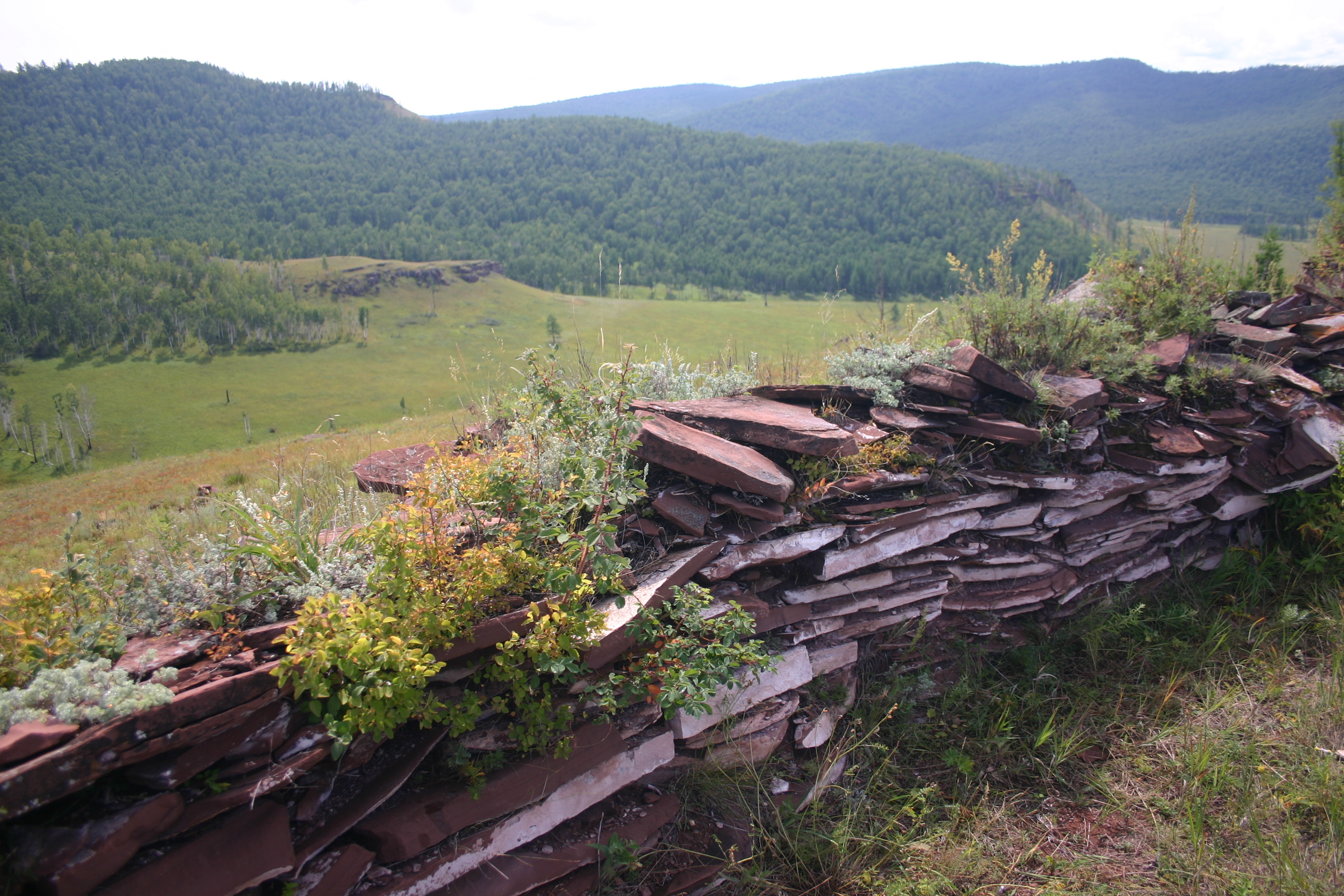
Fragment of the stone wall of the Chebaki fortress Sve-Takh

== Attractions ==
- The house of Ivanitsky, a two-story mansion with a tower-balcony and a spire was built in the second half of the 19th century from age-old larches. The mansion is decorated with carved platbands, openwork belts and cornices between floors. The house has been preserved; it was a school, then an orphanage, and recently, after a small internal reconstruction, the children's tourist recreation camp was located in the mansion. Nowadays the house of Ivanitsky is recognized as a valuable architectural monument of Khakassia of federal significance.
- In 1978 Gorky Film Studio produced historical film (Estern) "The end of the taiga Emperor" (Director Vladimir Sarukhanov, Screenplay Boris Kamov and Pavel Lungin) about the 1920s RSFSR and Russian Civil War on territory of Siberia, in Pokrovskoe (Chebaki) and Khakassia. The film reproduces one of the little-known pages of the biography of Arkady Golikov (future writer Arkady Gaidar and grandfather of Yegor Gaidar) and cossacks under Ataman Solovyov.
- An ancient Chebaki fortress Sve-Takh is located near to the village.

== General references ==
1. Decree of the Presidium of the Central Executive Committee of the USSR of 06/07/1933. "On the renaming of the districts of the same name and regional centers of the West Siberian Territory"
2. Monuments of history and culture of the Russian Federation. Archived on September 7, 2014., ITAR-TASS-SIBERIA (inaccessible link – history).
3. Encyclopedia of the Republic of Khakassia: [in 2 volumes] / Government of the Rep. Khakassia; [scientific-ed. advice: V. A. Kuzmin (prev.) and others]. – Krasnoyarsk: Polikor, 2008. Vol. 2: [O – I]. 320 p. : illus. S. 268 ISBN 978-5-91502-008-4
