= Sunduki =

Mountain range in Russia

The mountain range Sunduki
- IUCN category III (natural monument or feature)
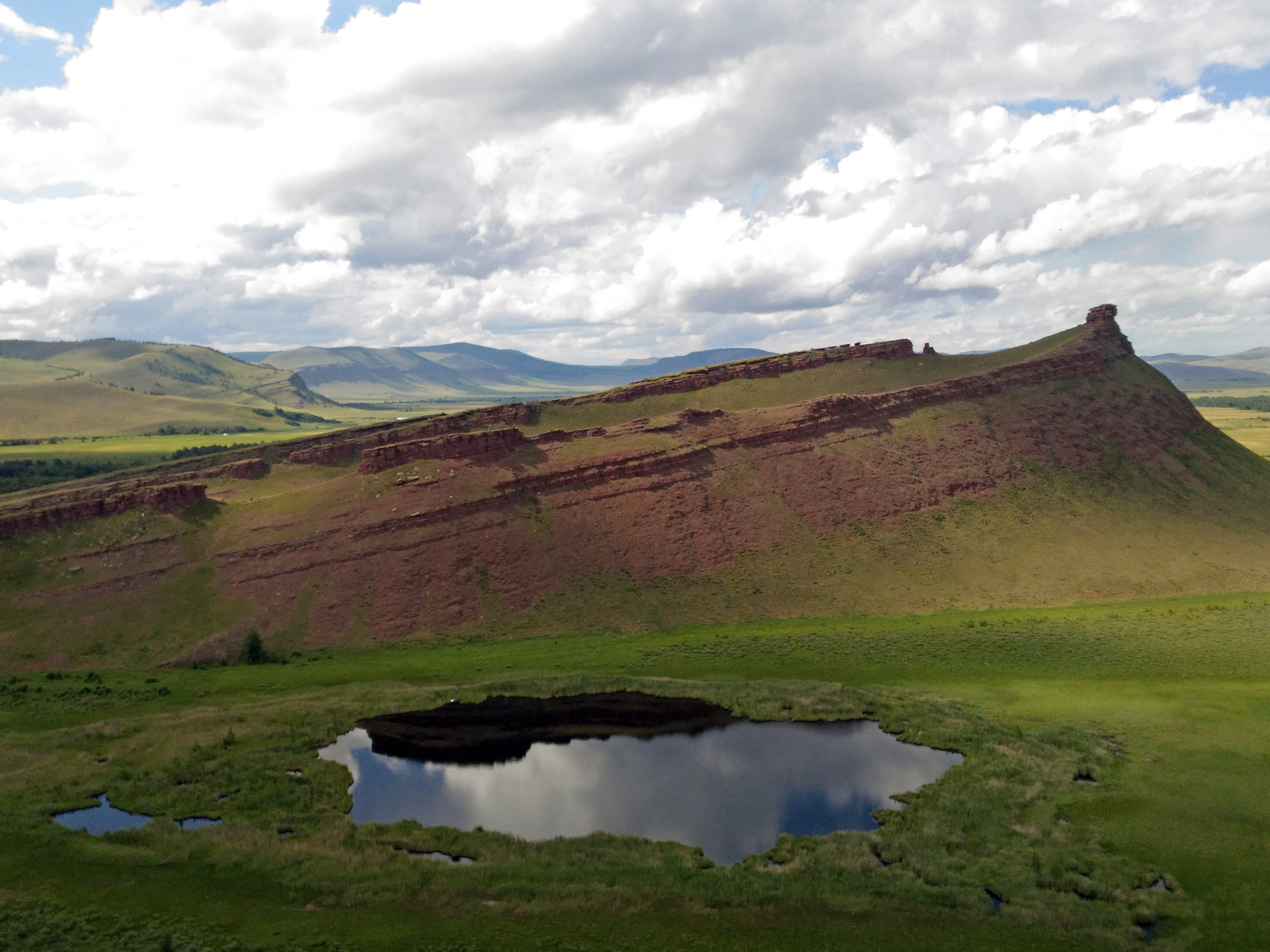
- View on the butte 1st Sunduk from the south

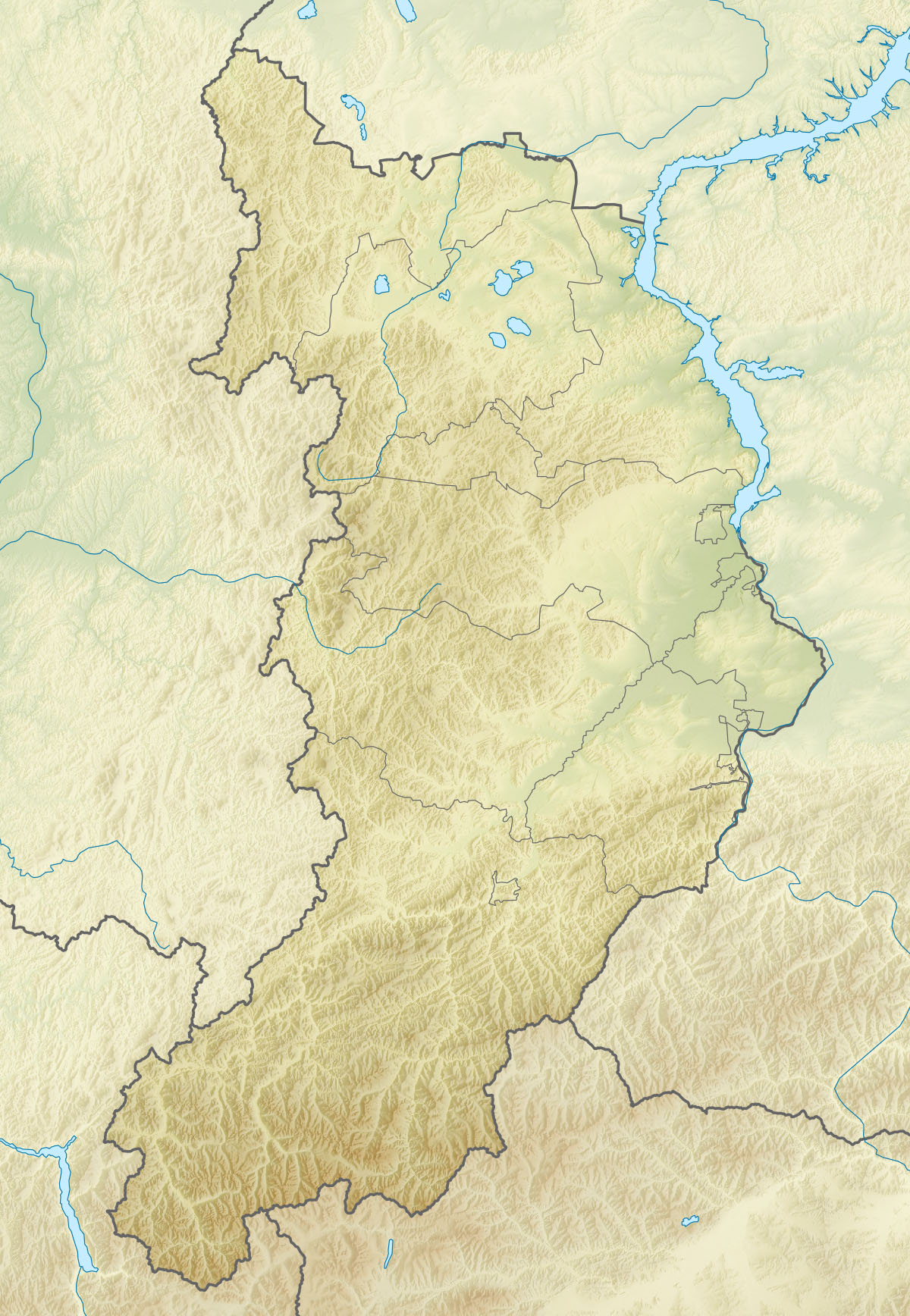
- Location within Khakassia
- Location: Khakassia
- Nearest city: Abakan
- Coordinates: 54°40′45″N 89°42′30″E
- Length: 10 km (6.2 mi)
- Area: 21 km^{2} (8.1 sq mi)
- Elevation: 557 m (1,827 ft)
- Established: July 21, 1988
- Governing body: The Sunduki museum-reserve

The mountain range Sunduki is a natural and historical monument of local significance in the Ordzhonikidzevsky and Shirinsky districts of the Republic of Khakassia, Russia. Since June 18, 2011, the Sunduki museum has been operating on the territory of the mountain range.

== Etymology ==
Russian: Горная гряда Сундуки, romanized: Gornaya gryada Sunduki, lit. 'The mountain range of Chests (furniture)'; Khakas: Сундухтар, romanized: Sundukhtar, lit. 'plural of Chest (furniture)'.

Khakas: Све Tағ, romanized: Sve Takh (Sve Tag), lit. 'Fortress Mountain'; Khakas: Онло Tағ, romanized: Onlo Takh (Onlo Tag), lit. 'Onlo Mountain'

== Description ==
The mountain range has a total area of 2100 hectares, stretching from south to north. It is the foothills continuation of the Efremkinsky ridge of the spurs of the Kuznetsk Alatau in the valley of the Bely Iyus river. The ridge consists of five separate mountain-remnants or buttes up to 200 meters high. The ridge got its name from the northernmost mountain, on top of which there is a rock in the form of a parallelepiped, which resembles a chest. The mountains themselves received the corresponding serial numbers: 1st, 2nd, 3rd, 4th and 5th Sunduki. The butte is composed of red Devonian sandstone of a characteristic red-brown color, hence its Khakas name Khyzyl-khaya (Red-Rock). The Sunduki mountains are characterized by a sharp asymmetry: the eastern slope at the top is very steep, while the western slope gently descends into the valley.

Sometimes four more mountains are attributed to the Sunduki, south of the channel of the Bely Iyus river: Abyyakh-khaya (Brotherly rock), Krest-khaya (Cross rock), Orta-khaya (Middle rock), Uzun-khaya (Long rock). These are the 6th to 9th Sundiki, respectively. All mountains in the range are quite low and accessible for climbing. From the top of the Sunduki you can see the surrounding low mountain ranges, neighboring Sunduki and open view of the ancient irrigation canals (1st millennium BC) in the Bely Iyus river valley.

== Nature ==
The Sundiki are a protected area of the Russian Federation. The status of protected areas was determined by the decision of the Khakass regional executive committee dated July 21, 1988 No. 164. Under protection are: various variants of phytocenoses, preserved virgin areas of the steppes, habitats of valuable, rare and endemic plants (Bupleúrum scorzonerifólium (lat.), Panzerina lanata (L.), Large-flowered slipper, Dryas, etc.) and the habitat of rare bird species (Peregrine falcon, Saker falcon, Lesser kestrel, Eastern imperial eagle, Horned owl, Steppe eagle).

== History ==
Historical sites associated with ancient human settlements, petroglyphs or pisanitsas of Tagar culture, tamga-petroglyphs, cultural and historical complexes, burial mounds, ancient burials, etc.

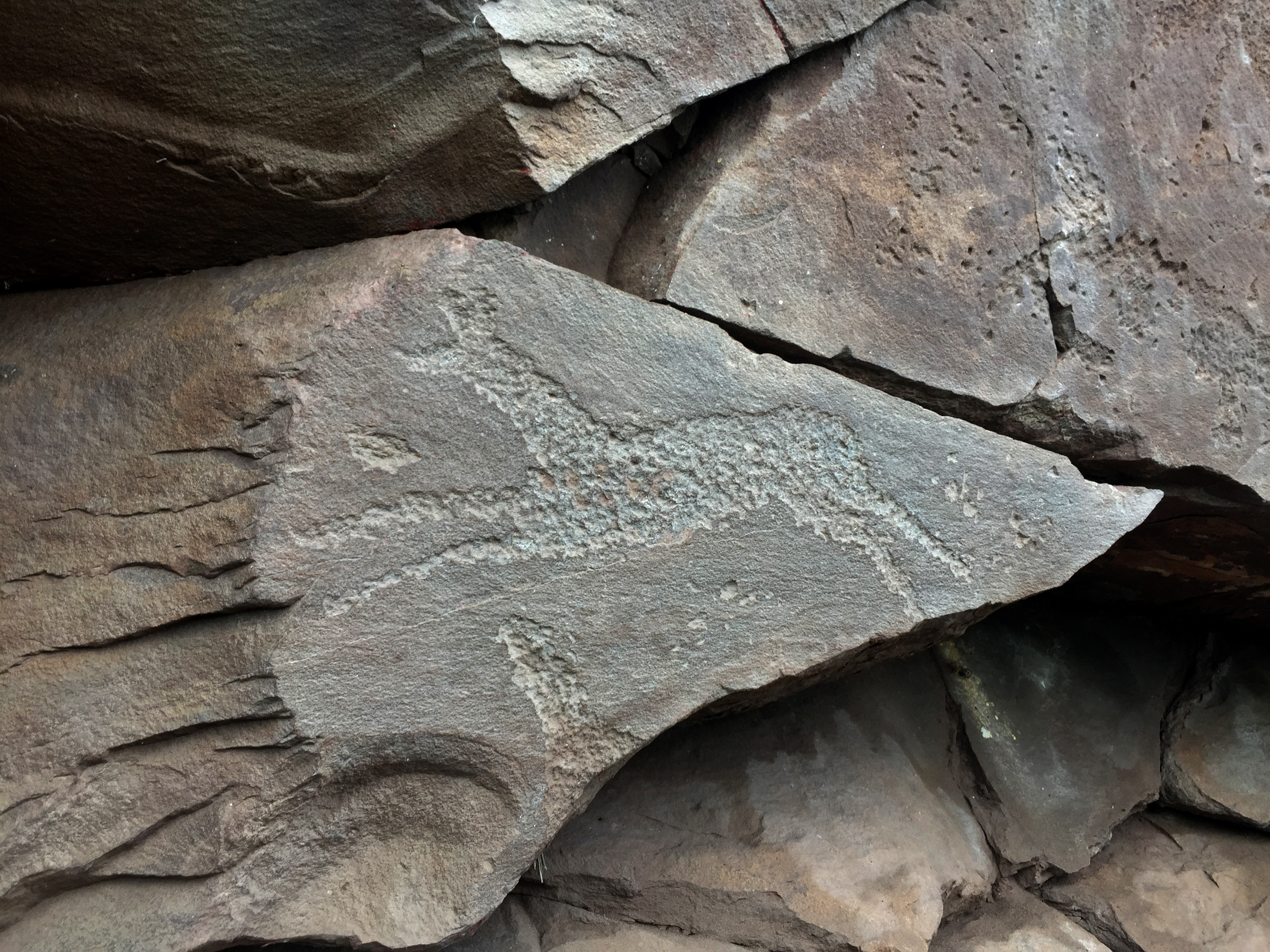
Roe deer petroglyph on the 4th Sunduk

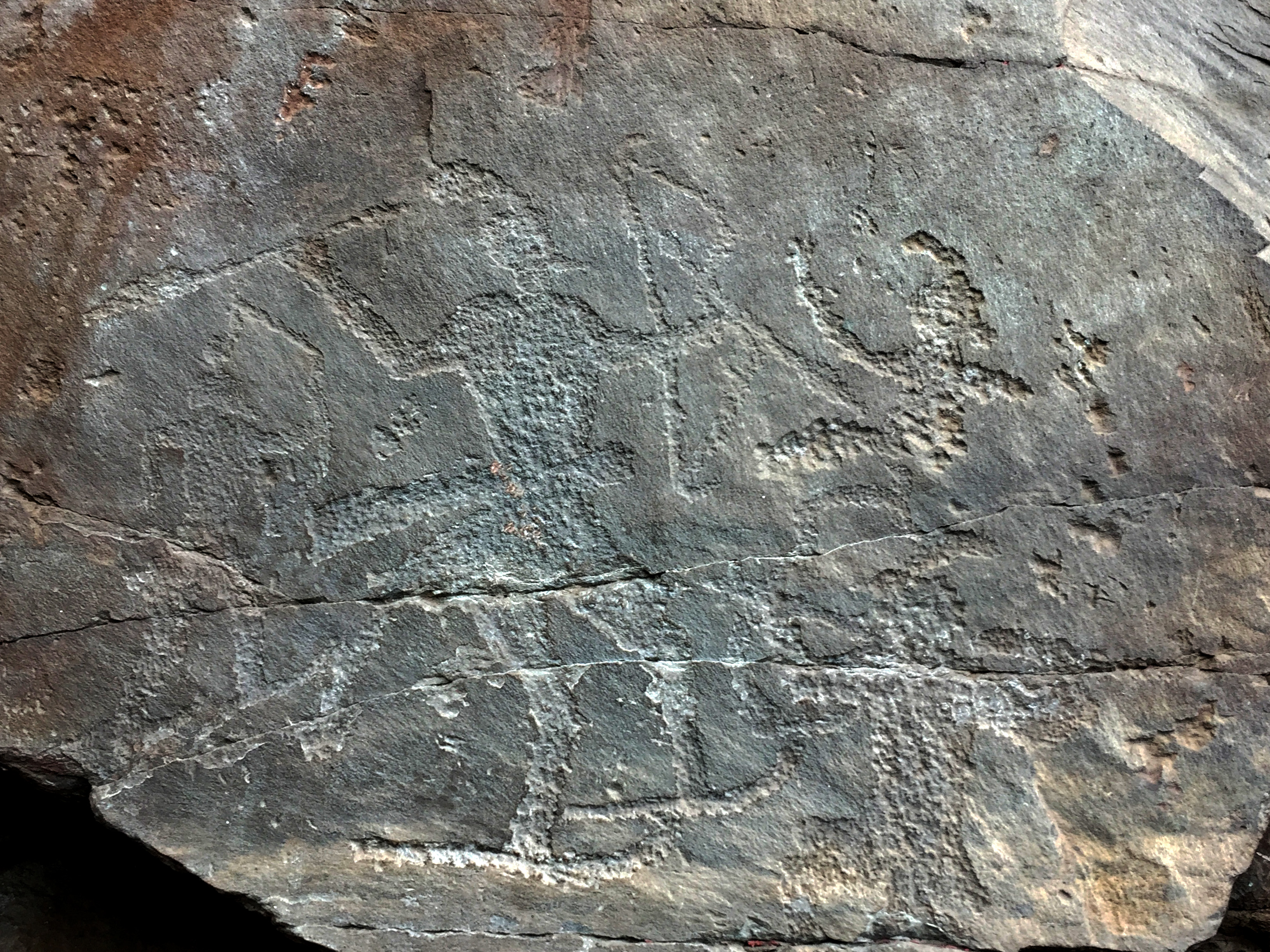
An archer on skis petroglyph on the 4th Sunduk

The fortress (khak.) Sve on mountain Tағ Onlo (1st Sunduk) is a small fortified area on several rocky ridges separated by deep logs. The stone wall runs along the western edge of the foot of mountain Onlo. Encircling the mountain, it rises up the slope to the rocky terraces, blocking the entrance to the mountain canyon in the most vulnerable place. The wall is a stone and earth rampart, best preserved in the central part. In the embankment flattened from above, turfed stones are visible everywhere, in some places there are vertical slabs on the outside. A fairly large fortification was probably used as a shelter for the population and livestock during hostilities. Sve on mountain Onlo is, apparently, part of the system of defensive structures in the valley of the Bely Iyus river. (khak.) Sve Onlo fortress is located on the western bank of the river. On the east coast, 10 kilometers north of Onlo, there is the (khak.) Sve Tarpig fortress. Today, the ruins of such ancient structures bear little resemblance to fortress walls and can be confused with the natural collapse of stones. Due to the poor study and the almost complete absence of dating finds, until recently, many scientists considered such structures to be medieval Kyrgyz or Mongolian fortresses-shelters, in which people temporarily took refuge from attacks, even calling them "ancient Tatar mountain fortresses".
According to legend, the fortification on mount Onlo was built by the Teleut prince Silig ool Chaizan. Probably built in the Bronze Age, the fortification functioned until the Middle Ages. It is also possible that during the period of the Kyrgyz state (VI-XIII centuries), the ancient wall was restored or even partially rebuilt, which was reflected in folk tales.

Interesting to notice that heroic epic tales of the Yakuts called Olonkho, which resembles similarity with name of Onlo (1st Sunduk).

There are many legends around the Sunduki. The mythical hero (khak). Khoho-Babay is said to have lived there, guarding the sacred valley from uninvited guests for thousands of years, and hiding its riches in a giant forged chest (1st Sunduk). He was rich and greedy, collecting treasure and turned it into a huge gold ingot so as not to share it with anyone. However, he did not know that admiring gold for a long time alone leads to complete blindness. Blinded, the hero turned to the gods with a plea to restore his sight. They demanded a precious ingot in return. Khoho-Babay cheated and promised to give them anything for the returned vision, but he deceived the gods. For this, the gods turned him into a bird of prey, and his wealth into a stone chest on top of the mountain. Since then, the deceiver has been circling over the mountain range in the hope of gaining a human form.

On the 1st Sunduk on mount Onlo there is a rock called "Seated King" or "Shaman chair". It is unique in its acoustics, because even word spoken in a whisper, will be heard several hundred meters away. On 1st Sunduk there were also carved faces, the so-called face of a warrior and the face of a shaman.

Interesting to notice description of the typical performances example of Yakut Shaman in action:

"During difficult and dangerous journey every shaman has places of rest, called Ouokh (Olokh), when he takes a seat during the dance, this signifies that he has come to an Ouokh; when he rises, he is ascending further up into the sky; if he falls down, he is descending under the earth. Every shaman, however far he may have proceeded on his journey, knows where he is, on which Ouoloh, and also the route taken by every other shaman who is shamanizing at the moment".

— Gorbatcheva, Valentina; Federova, Marina, Art of Siberia, Parkstone International. p. 266. ISBN 1785259334.

There are known 12 carved stones in shape of chests with name Onlo in Khakassia and 8 of them are located on the tops of the mountains. 5 Onlo chests are made of white stone (quartz or marble) and stand in areas where there is no outlet for these rocks nearby. Local people traditionally attributed Onlo stones to the legendary Chud people.

On 4th Sunduk there are group of petroglyphs or (rus) Pisanitsa carved more than two thousand years ago. These petroglyphs are a kind of the Tagar heroic epic, they show not only the difficult earthly path of the hero, but also the other world where he ends up after being killed by an enemy lurking in ambush, depicted in the lower part of the stone slab.

On the 5th southernmost Sunduk there is the "Temple of Time", which is a kind of measuring device. It represents a carved niche in which there is a sundial in the form of a Dragon, cut into six parts. It is not yet known how the ancient people were using it. Some believe that the Temple of Time is the oldest astronomical observatory. At the foot of the 5th Sunduk, there is a large group of burial grounds.
However, after the work of archaeologists, it became clear that many Sve, including Sve Onlo, were built not a thousand, but about 4 thousand years ago. Basically, they appeared in the Okunev era (mid- 2nd millennium BC). According to Gottlieb A., head of the KSU archaeological laboratory, which carried out a large-scale study of similar mountain structures in 1988, including Sve Onlo, "archaeological excavations convincingly confirm the existence of Sve even in the Early Bronze Age. Ceramics of this time are important evidence".

Larichev V.E. greatly contributed to the study and popularization of the Sunduki range. He was the author of numerous scientific and popular science books, in particular on archaeoastronomy: interpretations of cultural monuments of ancient people. According to the researcher, Sve Onlo (1st Sunduk, Saratsky Sunduk) was a sacred place from which we can learn about its creators' idea of the structure of the universe. He claims it represents an astrological sanctuary, including a priestly temple and an ancient observatory.

== See also ==
- Ancient North Eurasian
- Proto-Yeniseian
- Yeniseian people
- Prehistory of Siberia
- Afanasievo culture
- Andronovo culture
- Okunev culture
- Mal'ta–Buret' culture
- Tagar culture
- Yenisei Kyrgyz
- Yenisei Kyrgyz Khaganate
- Dingling
- Olonkho
- Tomskaya Pisanitsa Museum
- Afontova Gora
- Oglakhty
- Chebaki Fortress Sve-Takh
- History of skiing#Early archaeological evidence
- Böksta Runestone

== Sources ==
Printed sources

- State report "On the state of the natural environment of the Republic of Khakassia in 1998" (The same, 1999, 2000, 2001).
- Encyclopedia of the Republic of Khakassia: [in 2 volumes] / Government of the Rep. Khakassia; [scientific-ed. Council.: V. A. Kuzmin (prev.) and others]. - Abakan: Polikor, 2007. Vol. 1: [A - H]. - 2007. - 430, [2] p. : ill., portr. — Bibliographer. at the end of words. Art. S. 150.

Web-sources

- Samoilova G.S., et al. KHAKASIA // Great Russian Encyclopedia. Electronic version (2020) Retrieved: 25.02.2022
- Kuzminykh S. V. TAGAR CULTURE // Great Russian Encyclopedia. Electronic version (2017) Retrieved: 25.02.2022
