= Chebaki =

Chebaki may refer to:

== Places in Russia ==
- Chebaki (Khakassia)
- Chebaki, Perm Krai

== Other uses ==
- Chebaki Fortress, in Khakassia, Russia
