= Cherny Iyus =

River in Khakassia, Russia

Cherny Iyus Black Iyus
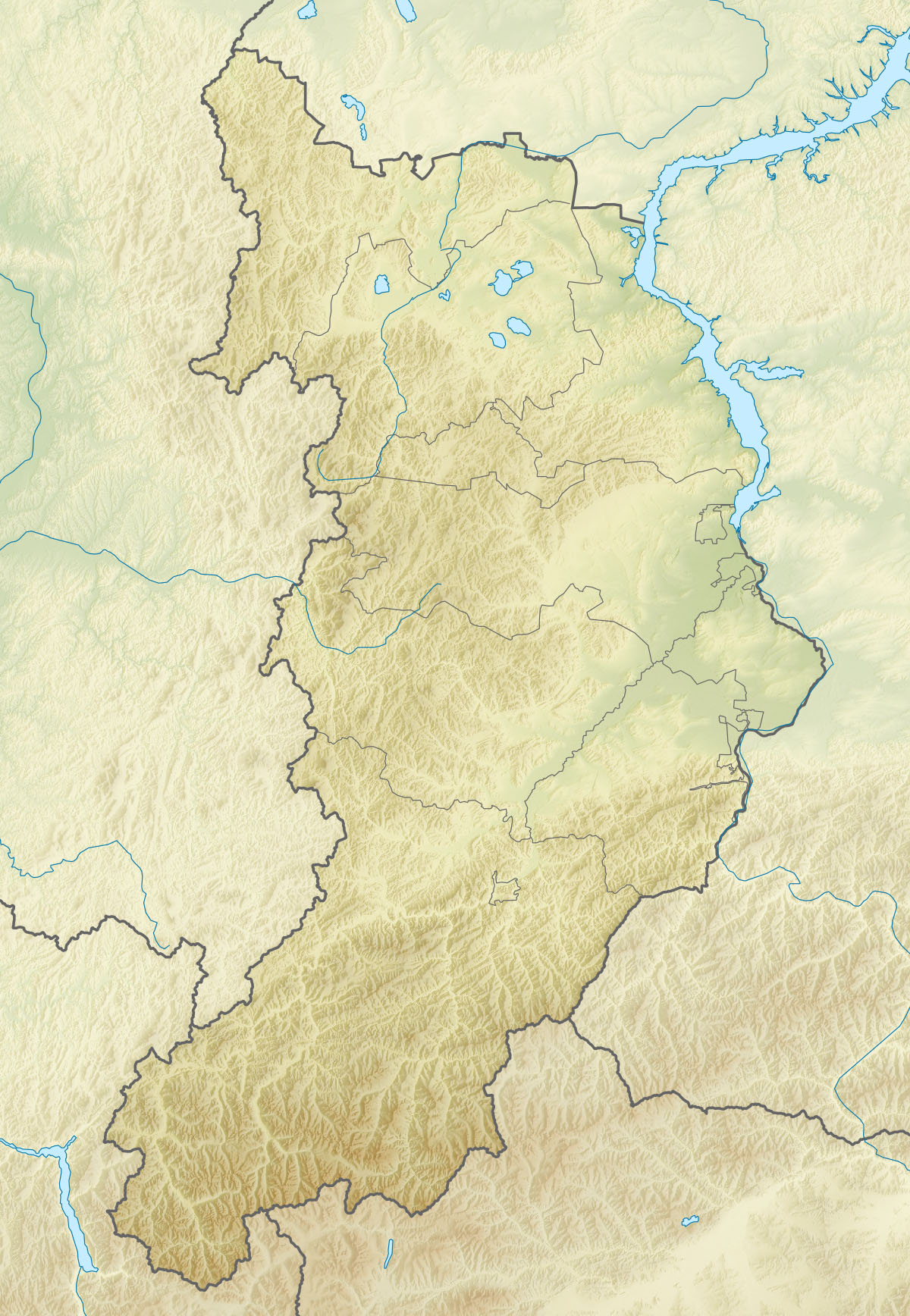
- Location within Khakassia Location within Russia
- Etymology: Khakas: Хара-Ӱӱс, romanized: Xara-Üüs, lit. 'Black River' Russian: Чёрный Июс, romanized: Cherny Iyus, lit. 'Black Iyus' Russian: Старой Iюсъ, romanized: Old Iyus, lit. ' Staryy Iyus'
- Native name: Чёрный Июс (Russian)

Location
- Country: Russia
- Federal subject: Khakassia
- District: Ordzhonikidzevsky District Shirinsky District

Physical characteristics
- Source: Tarn lakes and Glaciers on the eastern slope of Bely Golets mountain
  - location: Kuznetsk Alatau
  - coordinates: 54°22′21″N 88°23′14″E
  - elevation: 1,340 m (4,400 ft)
- Mouth: Chulym (Ob)
  - location: Malyi Siutik
  - coordinates: 54°56′57″N 89°49′53″E
  - elevation: 380 m (1,250 ft)
- Length: 178 km (111 mi)
- Basin size: 4,290 km^{2} (1,660 sq mi)
- Discharge
  - average: 43.1 m^{3}/s (1,520 cu ft/s) (55 км from Source at Sarala stream gauging station)

Basin features
- Progression: Chulym→ Ob→ Kara Sea
- Tributaries
  - left: Pechesche (Kostinsky Pechische), Ustinkin, Pravaya Sarala (Sarala), Chesnokov, Pelageiken, Tranjul, Cheryomushka, Inzhul, Izbass, Demidovka
  - right: Poltavka

Cherny Iyus is a mountain river in the northern part of Khakassia, Russia. It flows through the territories of the Shirinsky and Ordzhonikidze districts. Merging with the Bely Iyus it forms the Chulym River, the right tributary of the Ob.

== Etymology ==
Also known as Hara-Üüs, Chërnyy Iyus, Chyorny Iyus, Chyorny Yus, Czernoi Ijus, Tchernoi Yious Russian name Russian: Чёрный Июс, romanized: Cherny Iyus, lit. 'Black Iyus' comes from local name Khakas: Хара-Ӱӱс, romanized: Xara-Üüs, lit. 'Black River'. Occurs in the pre-reform spelling Russian: Старой Iюсъ, romanized: Staryy Iyus, lit. 'Old Iyus', and in the Khakass spelling Khakas: Кара-Ӱс, romanized: Kara-Üs, lit. 'Black River'.

An analysis of the toponymy of the Khakass-Minusinsk basin and the areas adjacent to it indicates that, along with the stratified Turkic toponyms of a later origin, toponyms clarified from the Ugric and Samoyedic languages dominated here.

The inhabitants of the Urals call the rivers flowing to the West White rivers; those that flow to the East or to Siberia, in Black rivers.

== Description ==
Cherny Iyus belongs to the middle size rivers of Khakassia. The length of the river is 178 km (111 mi) long. Drainage basin of Cherny Iyus is 4,290 km^{2} (1,660 sq mi).

Source of Cherny Iyus are the tarn lakes (Chernoye (Black) 1,310 m (4,300 ft):, Vysokoye (High) 1,310 m (4,300 ft), Dolgoye (Long) 1,210 m (3,970 ft), Verkhneye (Upper) 1,220 m (4,000 ft), Lake #80747788 1,150 m (3,770 ft) Lake #583652017 1,260 m (4,130 ft) ) and Glaciers #80747767, #80747752, #80747704 on the eastern slope of Mount Bely Golets 1,594 m (5,230 ft) in Kuznetsk Alatau.

Mouth of Cherny Iyus is river Chulym where Cherny Iyus and Bely Iyus join together. The height of the source is 1,340 m (4,400 ft), the height of the mouth is about 300 m (980 ft).

The swampiness of the river basin is about 5%, the forest cover is 75%. In the annual course of the water regime, spring floods are distinguished (starting from the second or third decade of April, lasting up to a month), summer-autumn (lasting 2–4 months) and winter (from late October to early November) base flow. Summer-autumn base flow is repeatedly interrupted by rain pickups. The total spring-summer runoff is 80–85%. In winter, icing is observed with the release of water onto the ice. The average annual water consumption is 43.1 m^{3}/s (1,520 cu ft/s) according to Stream gauging station in Sarala about 55 км from Source of the Cherny Iyus river. The waters of the rivers of mountainous regions, in the nutrition of which high-mountain snows and glaciers play a significant role, are characterized by a bicarbonate-calcium composition and very low (less than 0.1 g/dm³) mineralization.

Upstream (before the confluence of the Bolshoi Injul river) the river has a sublatitudinal direction of the valley with a typical mountainous nature of the watercourse. The valley is narrow, its width is up to 100 m (330 ft) – 300 m (980 ft) m, the height of the sides is up to 700 m (2,300 ft), winding, has a significant longitudinal slope (0.013). The speed of the river flow is 1.2 m^{3}/s (42 cu ft/s) – 2 m^{3}/s (71 cu ft/s) m / s, channel width 20 m (66 ft) – 50 m (160 ft), depth 0.8 m (2 ft 7 in) – 1.4 m (4 ft 7 in). In this part of the basin, the river has many tributaries, the main of which are: on the left – the rivers Podsnezhnaya, Demidovka, Izbass with Uspenka. Nameless and Bobrova, Berezovaya, Injul; on the right – the rivers Poltavka, Sargaya, Krutoy, Karagainsky Injul, Small Black Iyus, Big Injul. Tributaries on the right are smaller and shorter from 6 km (3.7 mi) to 25 km (16 mi) than the left tributaries, which usually have their own well-developed basins.

After the confluence of the rivers Big and Small Inzhul, Kolchakovsky stream, the general direction the river flow changes sharply to submeridional, the width of the valley increases to 3 km (1.9 mi)-5 km (3.1 mi) (near the village of Chebaki and the village of Gaidarovsk). A single channel is divided into many channels, branches, the largest of which reach a width of 25 m (82 ft) – 40 m (130 ft) at a depth of up to 2 m (6 ft 7 in), a longitudinal slope decreases to 0.0028. Further, before the confluence of the Sarala River, the valley narrows to 1 km (0.62 mi) – 1.5 km (0.93 mi), but her character remains the same. On this section of the valley, they flow into the Black Iyus River: on the left – small rivers and streams Systygchul, Stuchul, Blinzhul, Kerebezhik, Tranzhul, Sektinsky, Pelageikin, Chesnokov; on the right – Belaya Pilnya, Martachul, Izekiyula. After the confluence of the river Sarala Black Iyus again changes its direction to sublatitudinal, the width of the valley increases to 1.5 km (0.93 mi) – 2 km (1.2 mi), it also has many ducts, branches, small lakes and oxbow lakes, the longitudinal slope decreases to 0.0015. The river has only one tributary here on the left – the river Pechische

In its upper reaches, the river flows in limestones, but in general its left-bank mountains consist of granites and syenites, and the right-bank ones consist of clay shales, limestones and sandstones. Many gold-bearing rivers flow into the river.

Kyzyl people live in the valley of the Black Ius River.

== Tributaries ==
(km from mouth)

- 6 km (3.7 mi): Pechesche (Kostinsky Pechische) (left)
- Ustinkin (left)
- 52 km (32 mi): Pravaya Sarala (Sarala) (left)
- 84 km (52 mi): unnamed watercourse
- Kokchen (left)
- Chesnokov (left)
- Pelageiken (left)
- 93 km (58 mi): Tranjul
- 104 km (65 mi): Cheryomushka (Sastygchul, Sistychul) (left)
- 115 km (71 mi): Small Inzhul (Rozhdestvenskiy)
- Bolshoi Injul (Big Injul)
- 120 km (75 mi): Maly Cherny Iyus (Small Black Iyus)
- 128 km (80 mi): Inzhul (left)
- 140 km (87 mi): Izbass (left)
- 155 km (96 mi): unnamed watercourse
- Nizhnyaya Demidovka (left)
- Demidovka (left)
- Poltavka (right)

== Water registry data ==
According to the State Water Register of Russia, it belongs to the Upper Ob Basin District, the water management section of the Chulym river from the city of Achinsk to the water metering station in the village of Zyryanskoye, the river sub-basin of the Chulym river. The river basin of the river is the (Upper) Ob to the confluence of the Irtysh.

== History ==
The earliest scientific and cartographically accurate description of Cherny Iyus river region was done by German doctor and naturalist Daniel Gottlieb Messerschmidt in the expedition on the territory of the Yenisei Siberia 1720–1727 who was personally accepted into the Russian service by Peter the Great.

In it was described by German historian and geographer Müller Gerhard Friedrich in his notes during Great Northern Expedition 1733 -1743, at that time upper part of Chulym also was called Iyus.

In 1812 it become famous for the richest placers of gold and its development of gold mining. Gold placers began to be developed 1832, 507 poods of gold was mined in the Cherny Iyus river basin from 1834 and by 1900.

In 1835 it was also mentioned in "Description of the Yeniseisk Governorate" by the first governor of Yeniseysk Governorate in Krasnoyarsk Alexander Petrovich Stepanov in his work awarded the half Demidov Prize by the scientific community in the "Statistics" section and Nicholas I awarded Stepanov a diamond ring for this book.

In 1881 it was described by Pestov and noted that Chulym Tatar population was living around area between Cherny Iyus and Bely Iyus.

In 1890 was described by Nikolaii Vasilʹevich Latkin in the Brockhaus and Efron Encyclopaedic Dictionary and beside gold mining also mentioning copper mine and a factory in the tributary of the Cherny Iyus, the Pechishche River. The river basin region was known for monuments of ferrous metallurgy.

in 1967, a teacher at the Novokuznetsk Pedagogical Institute, Pyotr Stepanovich Shpin discovered the first glacier in the upper reaches of the Black Ius River with an area of 0.2 km^{2} (0.077 sq mi), the results of the following expeditions of 1968–1975 a Catalog of glaciers was compiled, aerial photographs were analyzed and a whole glacial system was discovered, consisting of cirque, hanging and slope glaciers with a predominantly northeastern exposure.

== Fauna ==
Moschus moschiferus listed in Red Data Book of Khakassia.

== See also ==
- List of rivers of Russia
- Chebaki (Khakassia)
