= Kopyevo =

Kopyevo (Russian: Копьево) or Kopyovo (Копьёво) is the name of several inhabited localities in Russia:

- Kopyevo, Kopyevsky Selsoviet, Ordzhonikidzevsky District, Republic of Khakassia, a selo in Kopyevsky Selsoviet of Ordzhonikidzevsky District of the Republic of Khakassia
- Kopyovo, Kopyovsky Settlement Council, Ordzhonikidzevsky District, Republic of Khakassia, a settlement in Kopyovsky Settlement Council of Ordzhonikidzevsky District of the Republic of Khakassia
- Kopyevo, Kostroma Oblast, a village in Ileshevskoye Settlement of Kologrivsky District of Kostroma Oblast
- Kopyevo, Omsk Oblast, a village in Mokhovsky Rural Okrug of Muromtsevsky District of Omsk Oblast
