= Koshkulak (mountain range) =

Mountain range

- Koškulak, Khoshkhulak
- Location within Russia

Highest point
- Elevation: 1,317.2 m (4,322 ft)
- Coordinates: 54°27′00″N 89°41′06″E

Naming
- Native name: Кошкулак (Russian)
- English translation: "Pair of ears"

Geography
- Location: Russia, Khakasia, Shirinsky District
- Parent range: Kuznetsk Alatau

Geology
- Orogeny: Alpine orogeny
- Rock age(s): Late Proterozoic, Early Paleozoic

Koshkulak (Koškulak, Khoshkhulak, Khoshkulakh, Kashkulak, Kushkulak) is a mountain range in Shirinsky District, Khakassia, Russia. West of the village Shira 18 km (11 mi) and south of the village Topanov 10 km (6.2 mi).

== Etymology ==
The etymology of the naming is controversial. It is believed to be derived from words Khakas: хос, romanized: khos, lit. 'pair, couple, one of a couple or to join, unite' and хулах, khulakh, 'ear'.

Meaning "pair, couple, one of a couple" or "to join, unite" probable of Turkic etymology from Proto-Turkic "*Koĺ" can be found with similar meaning in Yakut: xos 'double; again', Turkmen: goš 'a couple of oxen', goš - 'to add'. Meaning "ear" has probable Altaic etymology from Proto-Turkic: *Kul-kak.

+Turkic etymology from Proto-Turkic "*Koĺ"
Khakas: хос, romanized: khos, lit. 'pair, couple, one of a couple or to join, unite'
Tatar: quš
Karakhanid/Middle Turkic/Uighur/Kirghiz/Karaim/Salar: qoš
Uzbek: qọš
Kazakh/Noghai/Karakalpak: qos
pair, couple, one of a couple	to join, unite
Middle Turkic: qoš	Old Turkic/Old UyghurOyrat/Tuva/Balkar/Gagauz/Kumyk:: qoš
Sary-Yughur: qos	Turkish: koš
	Azerbaidzhan: goš
	Chuvash: xoš
	Tofalar: qo'š
	Bashkir: quš

+Altaic etymology from Proto-Turkic: *Kul-kak
Khakas: хулах, romanized: khulakh, lit. 'ear'
Old Turkic/Orkhon/Old Uyghur: qulqaq
Karakhanid: qulaq, qulqaq, qulxaq, qulaq, qulɣaq
Turkish: kulak
Tatar: qolaq
Middle Turkic/Sangl.: qulaq, qulaɣ
Uzbek: qulɔq,
Uighur/Sary-Yughur/Shor/OyratHalaj/Tuva/Tofalar/Kirghiz/Kazakh/Nogha/Balkari/Gagauz/ Karakalpak/Kumyk: qulaq
Yakut/Dolgan: kulgāk
Bashkir: qolaq
Karaim: qulax
Salar: gulaχ

== Description ==
The mountain is a natural monument landscape complex of republican significance. It includes cedar forests (an isolated cedar plantation in the low-mountain belt of the Kuznetsk Alatau) and in the southwestern part of the slope the Koshkulak cave 550 m (1,800 ft) long and 55 m (180 ft) deep. The place of cult rites of the Khakas. The mountain is one of the main peaks of the right bank of the Bely Iyus River in the area from the confluence of the Kharatas River into it.

The main mountain range has an area of 5 hectares. Height of 1,317.2 m (4,322 ft). For those looking from north to south, the mountain has the shape of a semi-oval with three prominent buttes at the top. From above, the massif looks like the letter S (due to the opposite streambed of the Glukhoi River (east of the central ridge) and Izvestkovy (Peshcherny) (west of the central ridge). A rocky belt stretches along the top, buttes up to 18 m.

== Climate ==
The climate is sharply continental. Due to the penetration of moist air masses through the lower northern part of the Kuznetsk Alatau, an increased amount of precipitation in the warm period and a heavy snow cover in winter, which contributes to low soil freezing. In summer and autumn, the mountain is often hidden by clouds, there is more precipitation than in the area around the massif. Average annual temperature approximately −1°С. As a rule, the temperature in the belt above 1000 m is always lower by 3–5 degrees. Köppen climate type: Dfc : Subarctic climate.

== Vegetation ==
Vegetation depends on the altitudinal zonation. On top the vegetation is represented by dwarf shrubs, cedar forests, moss in bare places, lingonberries, blueberries. The middle and lower parts of the massif are represented by three geographical and climate variants of the subtaiga flora: perhumid (according to Thornthwaite, the most humid type of climate with a humidity index of +100 or more), humid and semi-humid. Humid and semi-humid variants are most widespread, characterized by light-coniferous and small-leaved forests of pine, larch, birch, aspen (for humid ones) and light-coniferous forests of larch with an admixture of pine and birch (for semi-humid ones). The ecological and cenotic composition of the subordinate stages is represented by boreal forest and meadow mesophytes and mesohygrophytes, a significant number of nemoral species. Species saturation is from 60 to 40. In general, the vegetation belongs to the boreal-forest area. Represented by dark and light coniferous vegetation in the upper zone (above 1000 m) and mixed forests. The mixed zone is dominated by the black forest type (large-grass, fern, reed-large-grass group), above 800–900 m – green moss. Recently, due to an increase in the amount of precipitation, the border of the mixed dark coniferous forest has shifted and reaches 700–800 m. Larch grows everywhere.

== Geology ==
The mountain range of volcanic origin belongs to the Kuznetsk-Alatau geological region (Kuznetsk-Alatau folded cover system) and, according to remote sensing data, it is composed of carbonate, terrigenous and volcanogenic formations of the metallogenetic periods of the early Late Proterozoic and Early Paleozoic stages and granitoid of Bely Iyus river ledges and Batenevsky ledges. From the south, the mountain is composed of the Tunguzhul – Efremkinskaya sequence of formations (Tunguzhulskaya, Kolodzhulskaya, Efremkinskaya formations), which include gray, light gray, clayey and sandy limestones, siltstones, sandstones, gravelstones, horizons of conglomerates, tuffs, lavas of andesites, less often basalts ( over 1200 m). The region of the Tunguzhul – Efremkin formations is abundant with diverse forms of fossil trilobites. The core of the mountain consists of the Lower Devonian Lokhkovian stages, represented by the Tei – Koshkulak group of suites, composed of lavas, tuffs, trachydacites and trachyrhyolites, less often trachyleucobasalts, trachyandesitebasalts and trachyandesites. Explosive breccias, tuff sandstones, and basalt conglomerates (600–800 m) are also included. To the north, the spurs of the mountain are composed of Lower Devonian intrusive formations of the Devonian System of the system. Yulinsky complex (complex of the Yulinskaya suites). It is represented by syenites, granosyenites, monzonites, moderately alkaline granites, granodiorites. Deposits of copper-molybdenum ores, gold, rare metal and rare earth mineralization are possible. The Koshkulak Formation is also distinguished, characterized by the complexity of coarse-grained tuffs of basalts and trachybasalts, basalts, trachybasalts, and trachyandesites. The section is crowned with trachytes and trachyrhyolites (up to 40 m). The thickness of the suite is 340 m. It rests on the carbonate and intrusive rocks of the Riphean and Cambrian and is overlain by the Lower Devonian Matarak suite. The age of the trachybasalts of the Koshkulak paleogene volcano is 464 ± 11 million years (based on the isochronous rubidium-strontium Rb-Sr geochronological method). Paleomagnetic studies have established that the coordinates of the "Koshkulak" paleopole correspond to the position of the Ordovician paleopole for Siberia. In the section of the Koshkulak Formation (500 m), there is a successive change from bottom to top of trachybasalts, trachyandesite basalts, andesites and trachyandesites, trachytes and trachyrhyolites. The suite with angular unconformity, erosion, and conglomerates at the base overlies the deposits of the Bezymyannaya and Efremkinskaya suites of the Early-Middle (Amga Stage) Cambrian. Interlayers and lenses of conglomerates, red-colored cross-bedded sandstones are confined to its lower part. Tectonic Plate: Eurasian Plate

== Paleontology ==
Paleontological research of Koshkulak began in 1959 by Ivankin G.A., associate professor of the General Geology Department. This area is unique for paleontological studies of trilobites, due to the abundance and diversity of forms of trilobite fossils and their ontogenetic development of trilobite forms, common not only in Siberia, but throughout the globe. Many endemic forms such as Koschkulaspis procera, Binodaspina cf. remota, Botomellina cylindrical, Binodaspina lata, Aldonellus lepidus, Binodaspis patula, etc. The Koshkulak section is characterized by accessibility, good exposure and distinct stratigraphy. Trilobites Rondocephalus, Lenaspis, Bathyuriscellus, Binodaspis, Bulaiaspis, Tungusella were found in the Kolodzhul Formation. The trilobite Chondranomocare was found in the Bezymyannaya Formation of Koshkulak mountain. Paradoxides, Kooteniella, Erbia, Chondranomocare, Koptura, Kootenia, and Granularia were found only in the Sladkokor'evskaya Formation of Koshkulak section.

== Rivers and streams ==
The river Tyurim, river Kolodzhul, river Glukhoy (a tributary of the Kolodzhul) originate from the foot of the Koshkulak mountain.

== See also ==
- South Siberian Mountains

== Literature ==
- Ananiev, V. A. Geological natural monuments of the Shirinsky district of Khakassia / V. A. Ananiev // Questions of Geology of Siberia. – Tomsk, 1994. – Issue. 3. – S. 188–192
- Askanakova O. Yu. Cambrian trilobites of the Koshkulak section (Republic of Khakassia) / PROBLEMS OF GEOLOGY AND EXPLOITATION OF THE SUBSOIL, Ed. TPTU
- Koptev, I. I. Section of the Lower and Middle Cambrian deposits of the area of Mount Koshkulak (eastern slope of the Kuznetsk Alatau) / I. I. Koptev // Proceedings / Institute of Geology and Geophysics Sib. Department of the Academy of Sciences of the USSR. – 1983. – Issue. 548: Biostratigraphy and fauna of the boundary deposits of the Lower and Middle Cambrian of Siberia. – S. 82–90. — Bibliography: p. 90.
- Nomokonov, V. E. On the Cambrian stratigraphy of the area of Mount Koshkulak (right bank of the Belyiyus River, Kuznetsky Alatau) / V. E. Nomokonov // Izv. Volume. polytechnic in-ta. – 1964. – T. 127, issue. 2. – S. 15–19. — Bibliography: p. 18–19 (4 titles).
- Lipishanov A.P., Perfilova O.Yu., Sidoras S.D. New data on the age of volcanogenic deposits of the Koshkulak Formation in the Kuznetsk Alatau // Geology and minerals of the Krasnoyarsk Territory and the Republic of Khakassia, no. 3. – Krasnoyarsk, 1996, p. 37–39.
- Perfilova O. Yu., Mikhailenko V. V., Koptev I. I., Sidoras S. D. Koshkulak standard of the Ordovician volcano-plutonic association (Kuznetsk Alatau). – Krasnoyarsk: RIC KNIIGiMS, 1999. 159 p.
- Ivankin G. A., Nomokonov V. E. Geological structure and minerals of sheets N-45-60-B and N-45-72-A. Report of the Koshkulak PSP on the geological survey at a scale of 1:50,000 for 1960–1963. – Krasnoyarsk: TFGI, 1965.
- State report "On the state of the natural environment of the Republic of Khakassia in 1998" (The same, 1999, 2000, 2001).
- Encyclopedia of the Republic of Khakassia: [in 2 volumes] / Government of the Rep. Khakassia; [scientific-ed. Council.: V. A. Kuzmin (prev.) and others]. – Abakan: Polikor, 2007. Vol. 1: [A – H]. – 2007. – 430, [2] p. : ill., portr. — Bibliographer. at the end of words. Art. S. 148.
