= Kolyvan Viceroyalty =

1783–1796 unit of Russia

Kolyvan Viceroyalty Колыванское наместничество
- Viceroyalty of Russian Empire
- 1783–1796
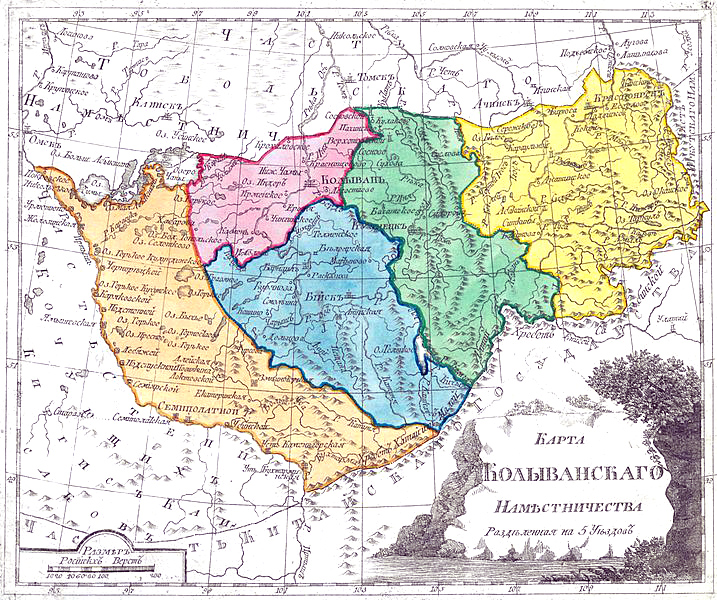
- Small atlas of the Russian Empire (1792). Map of Kolyvan Namestnichestvo (map 38).
- Capital: Kolyvan
- History
  - Established: March 17 [O.S. March 6 ] 1783
  - Disestablished: December 23 [O.S. December 12] 1796
Preceded by	Succeeded by
Tobolsk Governorate; Kolyvan Oblast	Tobolsk Governorate; Irkutsk Governorate

Kolyvan Viceroyalty (Russian: Колыванское наместничество), later Kolyvan Governorate (Russian: Колыванская губерния), was an administrative-territorial unit of the Russian Empire, which existed in 1783–1796.

It was created by decree No. 15.679. of Catherine II on March 6, 1783, by transforming the Kolyvan Oblast, separated in 1779 as part of the Tobolsk Governorate.

On May 12, 1783, decree No. 15.733 established the center of the governorate in the Berdsky ostrog and renamed it to the city of Kolyvan. It included 5 uezds: Kolyvansky, Biysk Uezd, Kuznetsky Uezd, Semipalatinsk Uezd and Krasnoyarsky Uezd.

By a decree on No15.737. on May 16, 1783, the Kolyvan Viceroyalty was formed as part of one Kolyvan Governorate.

The Kolyvan Viceroyalty included in its composition the entire district of the Kolyvano - Voskresenskikh factories, and the entire almost southern part of present-day Western Siberia, so that the Tobolsk Viceroyalty and Kolyvan Viceroyalty extended almost parallel, one in the northern and middle, the other along the southern strip of Siberia. Irkutsk Viceroyalty in full breadth closed them from the east.

In 1783 Jacobi Ivan Varfolomeevich was transferred to the post of governor-general of the Irkutsk Viceroyalty and Kolyvan Viceroyalty and reported to the Senate No.15.857 on October 23, 1783, about opening of Kolyvan Governorate on July 28, 1783.

The Kolyvan Viceroyalty did not manage to receive a coat of arms. In the "Russian Atlas, consisting of forty-four maps and dividing the empire into forty-two governorships" (1792), where the map of each governorship is accompanied by an allegorical composition with a coat of arms, an empty shield is depicted instead of the coat of arms of the Kolyvan Viceroyalty.

In 1796, the Viceroyalty was abolished, and its territory was divided between the Irkutsk Governorate and the Tobolsk Governorate. The administrative center of the Viceroyalty was also subject to abolition (preserved as the village of Berdskoye, now the city of Berdsk), and the city with the name Kolyvan was formed on the site of the Chausy ostrog in 1822.

As part of the Kolyvan Viceroyalty, there were territories inhabited by the Beltirs, Biryusins and Sagai people (the left bank of the Abakan River, the upper reaches of the Tom river, Cherny Iyus river, Bely Iyus river, partly Mrassu river and Kondoma river), who were yasaks of Kuznetsk; the lands of the Kachintsy and the Arin people (the left bank of the Yenisei river from the Bely Iyus river to the Kamyshta river) were under the jurisdiction of the Krasnoyarsky Uezd.

== Administrative division ==
Kolyvan Viceroyalty included 5 uezds: Biysk Uezd, Kolyvansky Uezd, Krasnoyarsky Uezd, Kuznetsky Uezd, Semipalatinsky Uezd.

Uezd	Uezd City	Modern entity	Notes
Biysk Uezd	Biysk	City in Altai Krai, Russia	Received city status during the reform of Catherine II
Kolyvansky Uezd	Kolyvan	Nowadays Berdsk. Town in Novosibirsk Oblast, Russia	Received city status during the reform of Catherine II
Krasnoyarsky Uezd	Krasnoyarsk	City in Krasnoyarsk Krai, Russia	
Kuznetsky Uezd	Kuznetsk	Nowadays Novokuznetsk city in Kemerovo Oblast, Russia	
Semipalatinsk Uezd	Semipalatinsk	Nowadays Semey, city in Abai Region, Kazakhstan	Received city status during the reform of Catherine II

== See also ==
List of viceroyalties of the Russian Empire

== Literature ==
- The first Russian peasants-occupants of the Tomsk Territory and different features in the conditions of their life and way of life (General essay for the 17th and 18th centuries). With a list of populated places in the Kolyvan region for 1782. Professor D. N. Belikov. Typo-lithography by M. N. Kononov and I. F. Skulimovskiy. Tomsk. 1898.
- Siberian Soviet Encyclopedia. T.1. Novosibirsk, 1929.
- Potapov L. P. Brief essays on the history and ethnography of the Khakass (17-19 centuries). Abakan, 1957.
- Sherstova L. I. Turks and Russians in southern Siberia: ethno-political processes and ethno-cultural dynamics. 1701 - early XX century. Novosibirsk, 2005.
