= Chulym (Ob) =

River in Russia

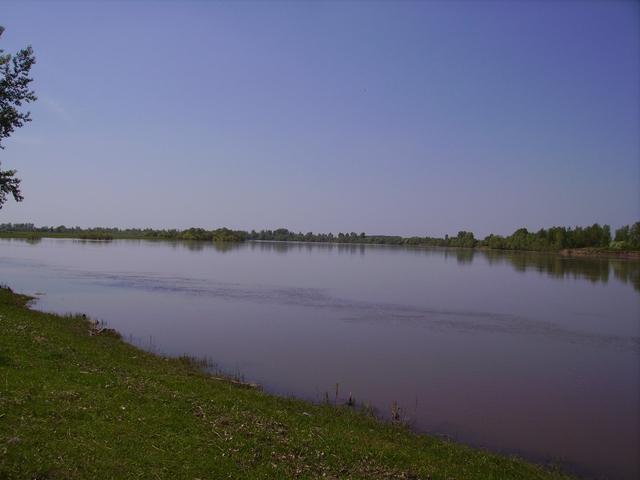
- The Chulym near Achinsk

Location
- Country: Russia

Physical characteristics
- Source: Bely Iyus
  - location: Shirinsky, Khakassia
  - coordinates: 54°06′47″N 89°06′25″E
  - elevation: 1,161 m (3,809 ft)
- 2nd source: Cherny Iyus
  - location: Ordzhonikidzevsky District, Khakassia
  - coordinates: 54°22′21″N 88°23′14″E
  - elevation: 1,340 m (4,400 ft)
- Mouth: Ob
  - location: Igrekovo, Tomsk Oblast
  - coordinates: 57°43′50″N 83°49′30″E
  - elevation: 54 m (177 ft)
- Length: 1,799 km (1,118 mi)
- Basin size: 134,000 km^{2} (52,000 sq mi)

Basin features
- Progression: Ob→ Kara Sea

The Chulym (Russian: Чулым) is a river in Krasnoyarsk Krai, the Republic of Khakassia, and Tomsk Oblast in Russia, a right tributary of the Ob. The length of the river is 1,799 kilometers (1,118 mi). The area of its basin is 134,000 square kilometers (52,000 sq mi). The Chulym is formed at the confluence of the rivers Bely Iyus and Cherny Iyus in the Kuznetsk Alatau. The Chulym flows into the Ob near Molchanovo. The towns of Nazarovo, Achinsk, and Asino, and the village of Komsomolsk are located on the Chulym. The main tributaries are the Serezh, Uryup, Kiya and Yaya from the left and Bolshoy Uluy, Kemchug and Chichkayul from the right.

== History ==
The Swedish explorer Johan Peter Falk noted 18th-century hunter gatherers living along the banks of the Chulym River.
