= Achinsky District =

Achinsky District Ачинский район (Russian)
- District
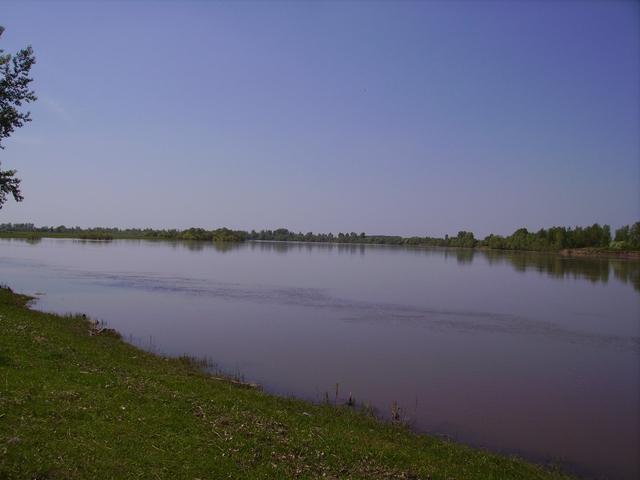
- The Chulym River in Achinsky District

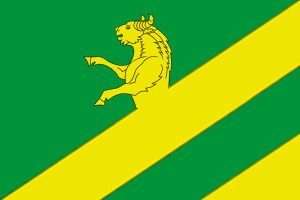
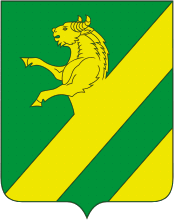
- Flag Coat of arms
- Location of Achinsky District in Krasnoyarsk Krai
- Coordinates: 56°15′N 90°30′E
- Country: Russia
- Federal subject: Krasnoyarsk Krai
- Established: April 4, 1924
- Administrative center: Achinsk

Government
  - Type: Local government
  - Body: Achinsky District Council of Deputies
  - Head: Tamara Osipova

Area
  - Total: 2,534 km^{2} (978 sq mi)

Population (2010 Census)
  - Total: 15,870
  - Density: 6.263/km^{2} (16.22/sq mi)
  - Urban: 0%
  - Rural: 100%

Administrative structure
  - Administrative divisions: 9 selsoviet
  - Inhabited localities: 48 rural localities

Municipal structure
  - Municipally incorporated as: Achinsky Municipal District
  - Municipal divisions: 0 urban settlements, 9 rural settlements
- Time zone: UTC+7 (MSK+4)
- OKTMO ID: 04603000
- Website: http://www.ach-rajon.ru/

Achinsky District (Russian: А́чинский райо́н) is an administrative and municipal district (raion), one of the forty-three in Krasnoyarsk Krai, Russia. It is located in the southwest of the krai and borders with Bolsheuluysky District in the north, Kozulsky District in the east, Nazarovsky District in the south, and with Bogotolsky District in the west. The area of the district is 2,534 square kilometers (978 sq mi). Its administrative center is the city of Achinsk (which is not administratively a part of the district). Population: 15,870 (2010 census); 14,904 (2002 Census); 15,597 (1989 Soviet census).

== Geography ==
The district is situated in the Chulym River valley and contains its tributaries.

== History ==
The district was founded on April 4, 1924.

== Administrative and municipal status ==
Within the framework of administrative divisions, Achinsky District is one of the forty-three in the krai. The city of Achinsk serves as its administrative center, despite being incorporated separately as a krai city—an administrative unit with the status equal to that of the districts. The district is divided into nine selsoviets.

As a municipal division, the district is incorporated as Achinsky Municipal District and is divided into nine rural settlements (corresponding to the administrative district's selsoviets). The krai city of Achinsk is incorporated separately from the district as Achinsk Urban Okrug.

== Economy ==
=== Transportation ===
The Trans-Siberian Railway runs through the district territory from west to east. The Achinsk-Lesosibirsk branch runs in the north and the Achinsk-Abakan branch runs in the south.
