= Chebaki Fortress =

Fortress sanctuary in Siberia

Chebaki fortress
- Sve Chebaki (Khakas)
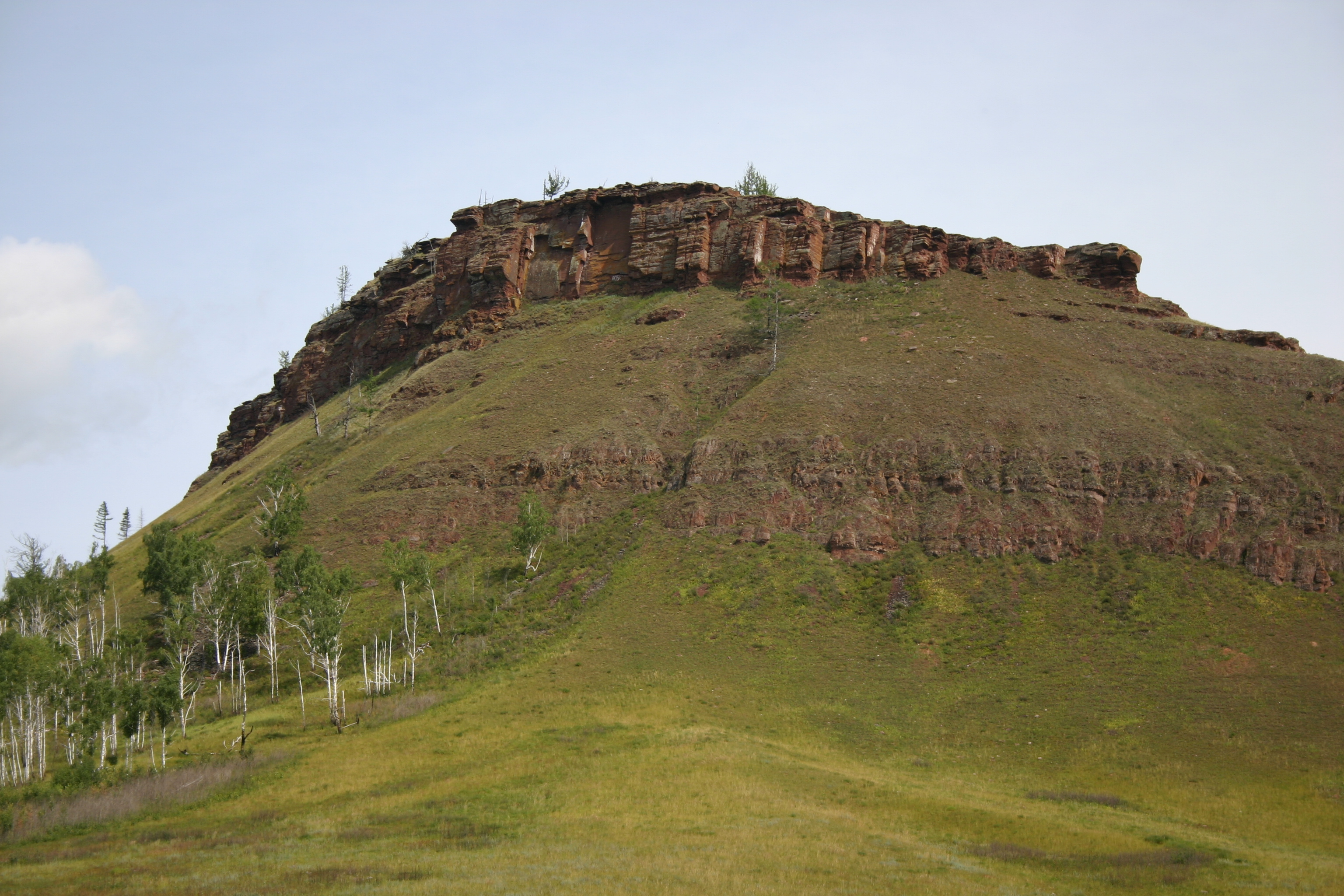

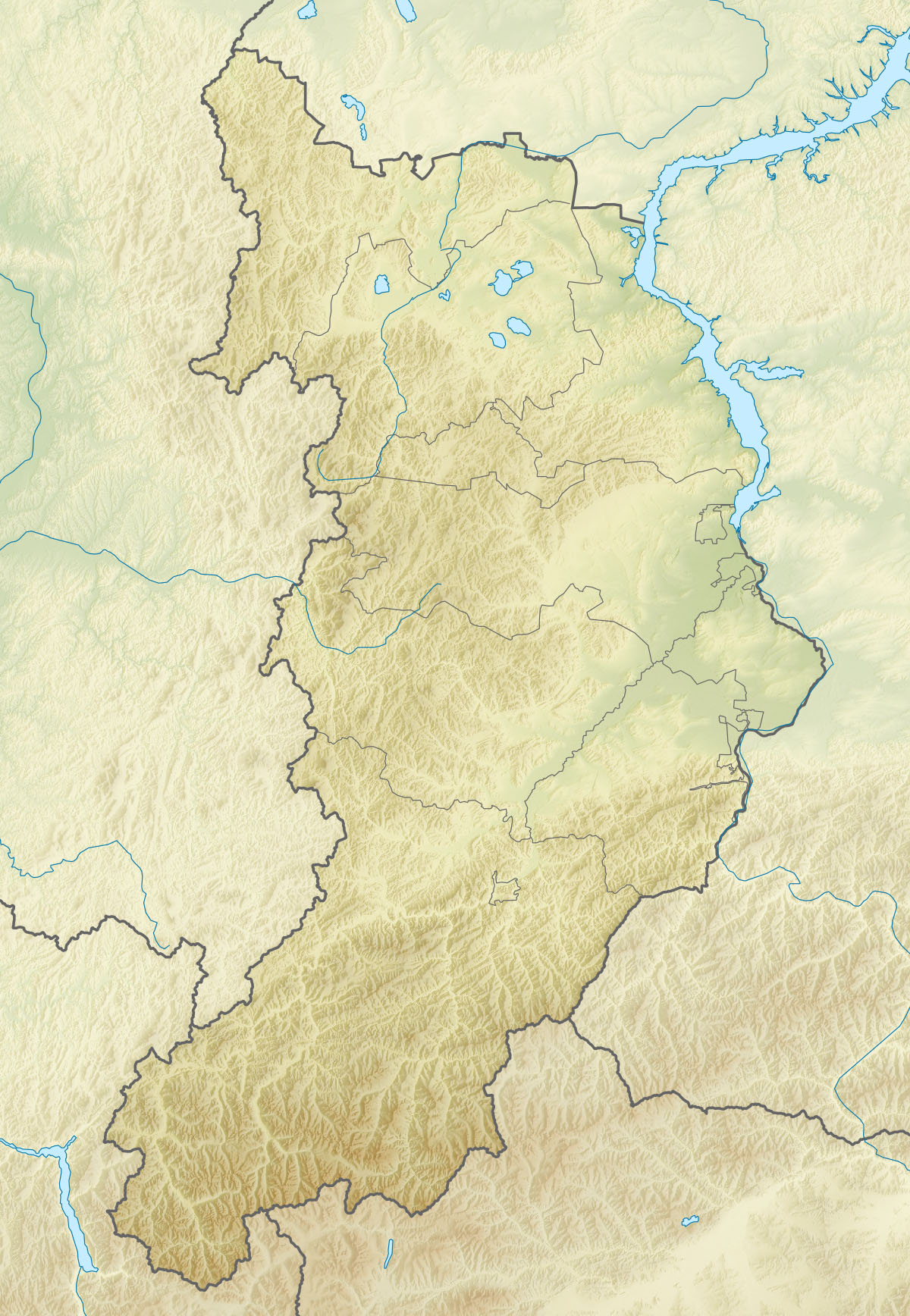
- Location within Continental Asia Location within Khakassia
- 54°37′44″N 89°15′01″E
- Type: Fortress sanctuary
- Periods: Bronze Age
- Cultures: Okunev culture
- Location: Chebaki fortress
- Region: Siberia
- Part of: similar 45 mount fortresses Sve in South Siberia

Site notes
- Material: sandstone slabs
- Architectural style: Sve mountain fortress
- Excavation dates: 1990, 1995-1997
- Archaeologists: Klements D. A., 1888; Gotlib, A.I., 1999
- Public access: yes

Chebaki fortress (Sve Chebaki) is an ancient mountain structure Sve fortress sanctuary from the Bronze Age (2nd millennium BC), located on the right bank of the river Black Iyus on the top of Chebaki mount Takh (Tag), 4.5 km northeast of the village Chebaki in the Shirinsky district of the Republic of Khakassia.

== Etymology ==
Russian: Крепость Чебаки, romanized: Krepost' Chebaki, lit. 'Chebaki fortress'; Khakas: Све Tағ, romanized: Sve Tağ, lit. 'Fortress Mountain'.

In the Khakass language, the term "sume" comes from Mongolian: Süm-e, lit. 'Temple, Church' Sumee or a place of prayer and often mixed with the word "sve, sybee, sibee" – a fortress (the sounds "b" and "m", as a rule, alternate; Khakas: Све, Ceбeе, romanized: Sve, Sebê, lit. 'Fortress, Fortification'). In southern Siberia and central Asia, similar fortification monuments are called shibee from Mongolian: Шивээ, romanized: Shebee, lit. 'Fortress, Fortification, military shelter, strengthening, Stockade, Hedge' Altay: Шибе, romanized: Şibe, lit. 'fortress, specially fortified, sometimes just a hard-to-reach place, mountain fortress, mountain shelter', Tuvan: Шивээ, romanized: Şivê, lit. 'Fortress'. Probably Altaic etymology from Proto-Mongolian sibeɣe, sibei, šibe'e 'stick, pole, rod; fence' and Khalkha šivē.

Reconstructed Proto-Indo-European swé / s(w)e / *se /*séwe /swé- – 'self' stem (and its substantive pronoun) was originally a reflexive element referring to all persons and numbers, as in Sanskrit स्व sva and in Proto-Slavic sę – 'oneself, myself, yourself, himself, herself, itself, ourselves, yourselves, themselves, each other', genitive of *sę in Proto-Slavic sebe sebe /се̏бе – '(of) oneself, each other'. Proto-Uralic *śe/ се / ся / шээ – 'it'. Compare to Proto-Germanic *swē – 'like, similar to, just like, in the same manner as, as if' and Latin se- "per se, by itself".

Reconstructed Proto-Indo-European *tag- – "to set in a row, to order".

After the discovery (more precisely, the beginning of the archeological excavations of the Minusinsk Sve), the researchers drew attention to the fact that there are similar fortress structures in other mountainous regions of the north of Central Asia – in the Baikal region, in the Altai Mountains, in Tuva. Similar monuments of the ancient societies culture are known in the Caucasus, Crimea, and the Balkan mountain systems, which include characteristic features of natural landscapes of hard-to-reach peaks. Chebaki Sve is one of approximately 45 similar monuments-fortresses of the Sve; most of them are concentrated in the northern regions of Khakassia on top of the mountains on Yenisei river. The Iyus Cherny and Iyus Bely valleys adjoin the forest-steppe "corridor", which for a long time was the only accessible passage to the Minusinsk basin, closed on all sides by the impassable Kuznetsk Alatau mountains, Sayn mountains, and Altai mountains. Such mountain forts Sve together with short linear fortifications of stone walls crossing river valleys, crossing passes in narrow mountain gorges, river terraces, and high mountain paths represent the strategic importance of this area in the Bronze Age to watch over river valleys and transfer messages to the next fortresses Sve.

Chebaki Sve is one of the most fully archaeologically explored Sve. It was traditionally attributed to the legendary Chud people and by folk legends to the Yenisei Kyrgyz. Sve monuments confidently include Ustanakh, Taptan Turazy, Shishka.

At least 15 mountains with name Sve Takh are known; for example, the Sve-Tag mountain peak 0.4 km east of the Bely Iyus river with the Sve-Tag grotto is located on the side of the Bely Iyus river valley, in the southwestern part of the foot of Sve-Tag mountain.

== Fortress plan ==
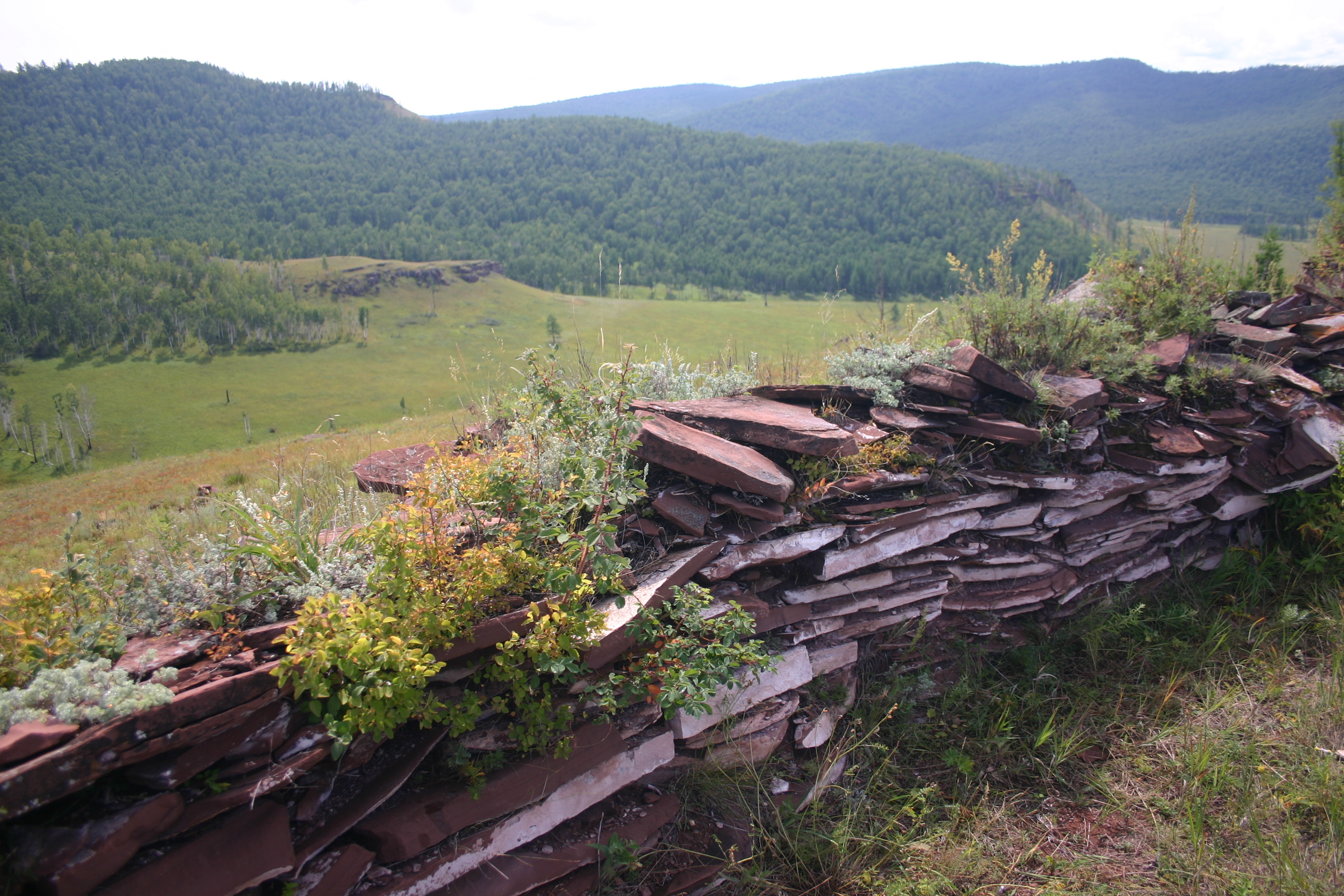
Fragment of the stone wall of the fortress

A certain similarity in the planigraphy and architecture of Chebaki Sve can be traced with such monuments as the Meshoko fortress of the Maikop culture in the Kuban region and the Liventsovskaya fortress of the catacomb period in the lower reaches of the Don river. The fortress has two lines of defensive dry-stone walls built of sandstone slabs without application of binding solution. The outer wall cuts off the approach along the saddle from the neighboring peak to the section of the mountain top measuring 160 × 170 m. The total length of the outer wall is 210 m. At the time of research, the height of the wall reached 1.8 m; today, the height of the wall reaches 1.5 m, while the masonry of the walls is perfectly preserved. The inner wall of the fortress limits a small section of the top, which was the citadel. The territory between the walls has a sharp slope and has no traces of use; therefore, it is believed that the outer wall did not arise during the expansion of the fortress, but at the same time, as a single complex with the citadel. Inside the citadel, close to the wall, a semi-dugout about 4 × 15 meters in size was archaeologically revealed. In the western part, two small outbuildings or fences made of stone, oval and subrectangular in plan, 4 × 5 m and 4 × 6 m in size, were also attached close to the wall.

== Archaeological research ==
For the first time, the Sve building was investigated (introduced into scientific circulation) in 1888 by the archaeologist Klements D. A. He drew attention to the typological connection of such as Sve Ustanakh, Syrsky Sve and Chebaki Sve, believing that these monuments belonged to the same people.

Excavations began in 1990 and continued on the territory of the citadel fortification in 1995–1997. A representative complex of finds of household items and works of art from ancient man of the Bronze Age has been collected on a compact territory. The total area of excavations in the citadel was 330 m^{2}. The thickness of the cultural layer is 0.5–0.9 m. A cultural layer containing numerous animal bones, fragments of ceramics, and material remains of the Bronze Age was revealed.

1304 fragments were found from about 69 vessels, which is 95% of the total number of ceramics of the Bronze Age. A significant part of the excavation area was a collapse of stone slabs of the citadel fortification wall and internal structures attached to the wall. Most of the pottery finds were found during the dismantling of stone ruins, between the slabs and under them. It is difficult to identify the chronological sequence of the cultural layers of the site because of their redeposited state. The most expressive category of finds is the mass ceramic material of the Okunev culture. This is mainly found in the lower layers of the excavation. The Okunev ceramics from Chebaki Sve, in terms of character and ornamentation, find analogies in the Okunev burial sites of the Minusinsk Basin. However, ceramics of the Kamenniy Log culture (tradition of the Karasuk culture) are also present on the territory of the citadel.

The faunistic remains from the Chebaki Sve are quite numerous (32,000 different bone fragments). The determination of the species composition of animals was carried out by M. V. Sablin, an employee of the Zoological Institute of the Russian Academy of Sciences in St. Petersburg. The vast majority of the bones belong to wild animals (16 species: roe deer, deer, elk, musk deer, wild boar, bear, lynx, fox, beaver, birds, etc.). Domestic animals are determined by single animals (cow, horse, sheep).

An analysis of the archaeological excavation materials does not allow the interpretation of Sve structures as domestic residential complexes.

== Interpretation of the monument ==
The Chebaki Sve is characterized by the following general features of the late Bronze Age:

- for the construction, the tops of the mountains were chosen, crowned with a remnant-cliff or butte, which are visible from different sides;
- Sve were not built on the highest point of the mountain range. In these cases, the territory of the monument is clearly visible;
- during construction, sheer cliffs were used as a natural component;
- some Sve have walls that do not have a defensive function.

The significance of Sve Chebaki as the fortification is disputable, since on the one hand the image of the fortress is visibly present in the architectural design, but the fortification level of the monument is low. A vulnerable moment in the defense of the Sve is the complete absence of permanent sources of water inside the fortifications. The cultural layer contains traces of human presence – coals, bones, ceramics, and stone tools (including axes, adzes) and blanks for their production. However, not a single hearth was found, which makes it difficult to interpret the settlement as a fortified estate.

Presumably, the integral architectural appearance of the citadel was formed in the Okunev time, more precisely at the moment when the Okunev culture began to come into close contact with the Kamenno-Lozh culture (tradition of the Karasuk culture) around end of the 2nd millennium BC – beginning of the 1st millennium BC. Savinov D.G. pointed to such possible interpretations of the monument as a fortress, a settlement-shelter, a ritual center ("closer to Heaven"), a seasonal hunting settlement, and also that the fortresses could mark the territorial division of the regions of the Okunev and Kamenno-Lozh cultures (tradition of the Karasuk culture) at some point in time. At the same time, one should not forget about the prestige, demonstration of the influence and power of the tribal aristocracy, which can concentrate significant resources for the construction of a high-mountain fortress.

According to the interpretation of Gottlieb A. I., Chebaki Sve and other similar Sve fortresses were used and served as the center of attraction for the Okunev people already during the predominance of the Kamenno-Lozh culture (tradition of the Karasuk culture) in the valleys (the so-called period of survival of the Okunev culture), like the fortified mountain villages in the Caucasus or the tower houses of the Scottish clans.

== See also ==
- Oglakhty
- Sunduki mountain range
- Okunev culture
- Afanasievo culture
- Enclosure (archaeology)
