= Chebaki, Perm Krai =

Chebaki Чебаки
- Village
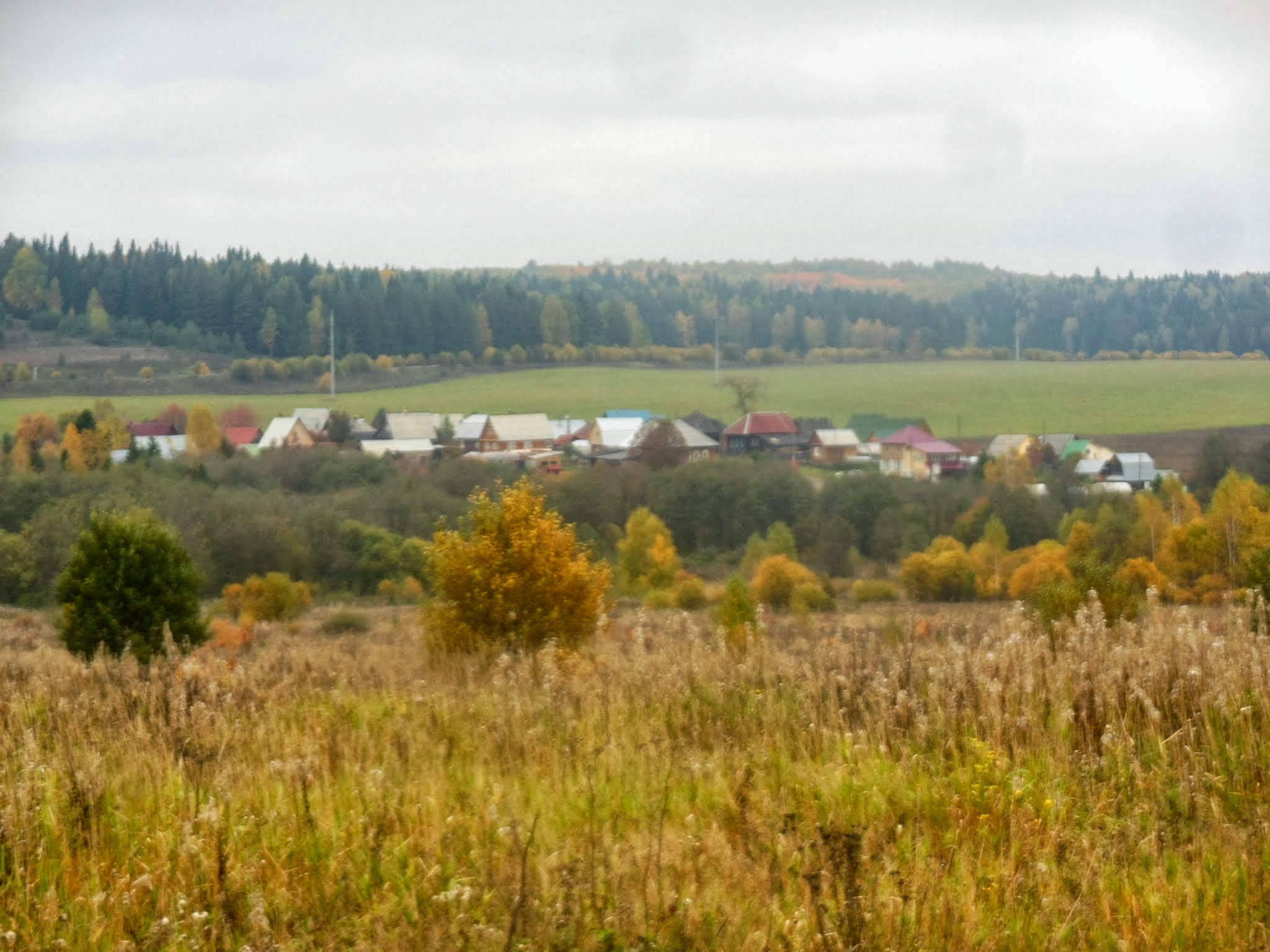

- Location within Perm Krai Location within Russia
- Coordinates: 57°48′N 56°33′E
- Country: Russia
- Region: Perm Krai
- District: Permsky District
- Time zone: UTC+5:00

Chebaki (Russian: Чебаки) is a rural locality (a village) in Dvurechenskoye Rural Settlement, Permsky District, Perm Krai, Russia. The population was 3 as of 2010. There are 3 streets.

== Geography ==
Chebaki is located 36 km southeast of Perm (the district's administrative centre) by road. Rassolnaya is the nearest rural locality.
