= Kopyovo, Kopyovsky Settlement Council, Ordzhonikidzevsky District, Republic of Khakassia =

Rural locality in Khakassia, Russia

Coordinates: 54°59′27″N 89°49′23″E

Kopyevo (Russian: Копьёво; Khakas: Арға пазы, Arğa pazı) is a rural locality (a settlement) and the administrative center of Ordzhonikidzevsky District of the Republic of Khakassia, Russia. Population: 4,401 (2010 census); 4,935 (2002 census); 5,772 (1989 Soviet census).
