= Mazulsky =

Mazulsky Мазульский
- Urban-type settlement
- Interactive map of Mazulsky
- Location of Mazulsky Mazulsky (Krasnoyarsk Krai)
- Coordinates: 56.2084°N 90.3261°E
- Country: Russia
- Federal subject: Krasnoyarsk Krai
- Founded: 1930

Population (2010 Census)
  - Total: 1,293
  - Estimate (2021): 1,451 (+12.2%)
- Time zone: UTC+7 (MSK+4)
- OKTMO ID: 04703000056

Mazulsky (Russian: Мазульский) is an urban locality (an urban-type settlement) in Krasnoyarsk Krai, Russia. Population: 1,293 (2010 census); 1,326 (2002 census); 1,638 (1989 Soviet census).
