= Achinsk =

City in Krasnoyarsk Krai, Russia

Achinsk Ачинск
- City
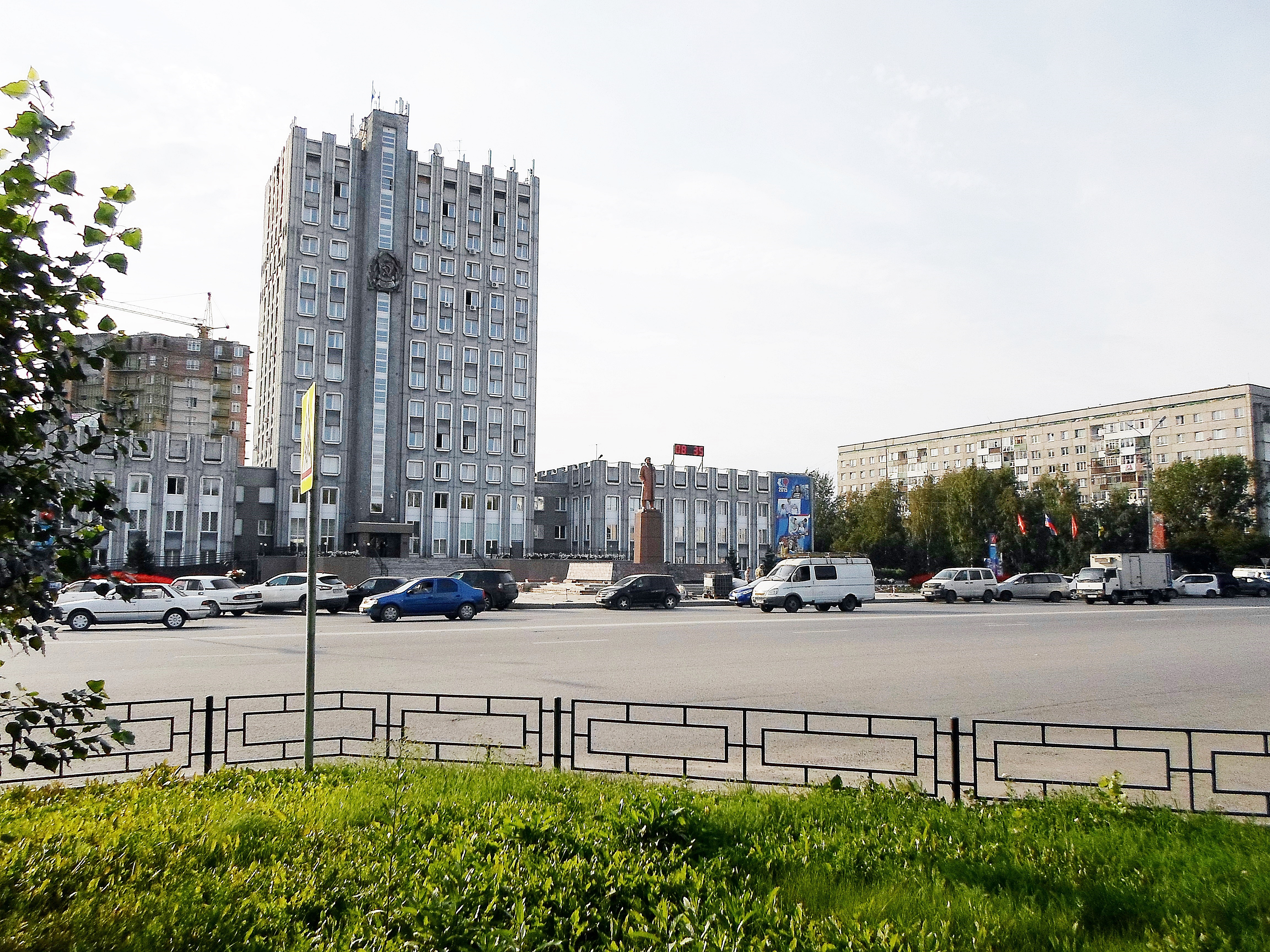

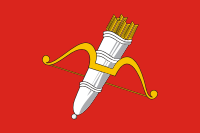
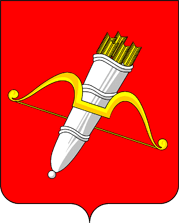
- Flag Coat of arms
- Interactive map of Achinsk
- Location of Achinsk Achinsk (Krasnoyarsk Krai)
- Coordinates: 56°16′54″N 90°30′14″E
- Country: Russia
- Federal subject: Krasnoyarsk Krai
- Founded: July 25, 1641
- City status since: 1782

Area
  - Total: 103 km^{2} (40 sq mi)
- Elevation: 220 m (720 ft)

Population (2010 Census)
  - Total: 109,155
  - Estimate (2025): 99,048 (−9.3%)
  - Rank: 148th in 2010
  - Density: 1,060/km^{2} (2,700/sq mi)

Administrative status
  - Subordinated to: krai city of Achinsk
  - Capital of: krai city of Achinsk, Achinsky District

Municipal status
  - Urban okrug: Achinsk Urban Okrug
  - Capital of: Achinsk Urban Okrug, Achinsky Municipal District
- Time zone: UTC+7 (MSK+4)
- Postal code: 662150-662189
- Dialing code: +7 39151
- OKTMO ID: 04703000001
- Website: www.adm-achinsk.ru

Achinsk (Russian: А́чинск) is a city in Krasnoyarsk Krai, Russia, located on the right bank of the Chulym River near its intersection with the Trans-Siberian Railway, 160 kilometers (99 mi) west of Krasnoyarsk. It has a population of 109,155 as of the 2010 Census.

== History ==
Achinsk is one of the oldest known inhabited places in the area. Paleontological study has shown that people lived here as early as 28,000–20,000 BCE. Some of these ancient caves are located 2 kilometers (1.2 mi) east of the city.

The modern city, however, was founded on July 25, 1641 as an ostrog on the Bely Iyus River. After the fire of 1683, it was moved to the Chulym River (a tributary of the Ob); hence, the official foundation date of the city is considered to be July 25, 1683. The name of the location derives from the Turkic tribal group Achi or Achigi. The first fort in 1683 was built with high square stockade walls. In the corners were placed watch towers. Initially the garrison had fifteen Cossacks patrolling it. In 1710, a new wooden fort on the right bank of the Achinki River was created, at its confluence with the Chulym.

In 1782, it was granted status of an uyezd town. In the late 19th century, the town became linked on the Trans-Siberian Railway.

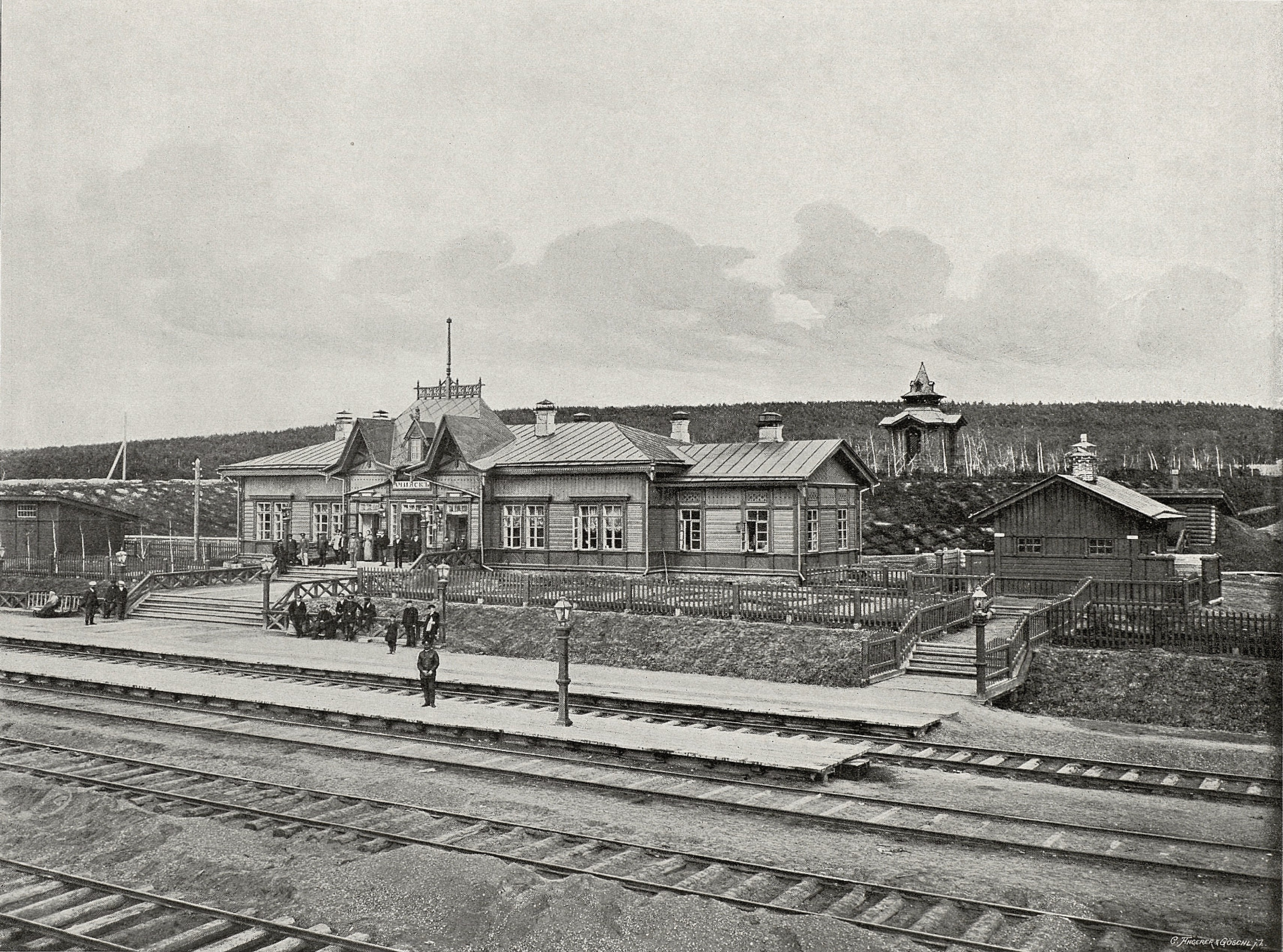
Achinsk train station in 1899

Since 1990, Achinsk has been included in the official list of cities in Russia with historical and cultural value of nationwide significance.

In the late 1980s and early 1990s burial sites of those executed during the Great Terror were identified: the toy factory and the airport.

In August 2019 a massive explosion in a military base (Russian: 60-й Инженерно-Сапёрный Берлинский Краснознамённый полк, в/ч 12202) occurred some 20 km south of the town, next to the village of Kamenka.

== Administrative and municipal status ==
Within the framework of administrative divisions, Achinsk serves as the administrative center of Achinsky District, even though it is not a part of it. As an administrative division, it is, together with one urban-type settlement (Mazulsky), incorporated separately as the krai city of Achinsk—an administrative unit with the status equal to that of the districts. As a municipal division, the krai city of Achinsk is incorporated as Achinsk Urban Okrug.

== Demographics ==
Achinsk grew rapidly in the 20th century: from a population of 32,000 in 1939, to 85,000 in 1969, to 121,572 in the 1989 Census. The population declined slightly in the early 21st century: 118,744 (2002 Census) and 109,155 (2010 Census).

Historical population
Year	Pop.	±%
1897	7,026	—
1926	18,000	+156.2%
1939	32,484	+80.5%
1959	50,323	+54.9%
1970	97,001	+92.8%
1979	116,854	+20.5%
1989	121,572	+4.0%
2002	118,744	−2.3%
2010	109,155	−8.1%
2021	100,621	−7.8%
Source: Census data

== Economy ==
The economy of Achinsk is based around heavy industry and contains a refinery and also produces construction materials, including wood, asphalt, cement. Mechanical, wax, brick and electrical plants are also present. It is also involved with the food industry and contains dairy factories and a meat processing plant as well as footwear and furniture factories.

The largest enterprise of the city, the Achinsk Alumina Plant, belongs to the "Rusal" group. In addition, the city operates a cement plant which produces about two million tons of cement per year.

=== Transportation ===
The city operates buses, trams, and taxis, and is served by the Achinsk Airport.

== Culture and education ==
As of 2006, Achinsk has eleven health facilities and over twenty schools. Notable landmarks include the Achinsk Drama Theater, Achinsk National History Museum, Achinsk Museum and Exhibition Center, and the Kazan Cathedral (1832).

The print media are represented by the municipal authority "Achinskaya Gazeta", the regional publication "Prichulymsky Vestnik", as well as local private publications: "Novaya Prichulymka" and "Gorod" A ". The newspaper "Komsomolskaya Pravda" is published. There are three local TV channels in Achinsk: Achinsk Television (ATV), Novy Vek and OSA.

== Notable people ==
- Ivan Ignatyev, footballer

== Climate ==
Achinsk has a humid continental climate (Köppen Dfb) bordering closely on a subarctic climate (Dfc), just like its neighbouring cities in southern Krasnoyarsk Krai. Winter is moderately cold, just like Western Siberia, however extreme temperatures below −50 °C have been recorded. Summers are warm and damp, much wetter than winters.

Climate data for Achinsk (1991-2020, extremes 1900–present)
Month	Jan	Feb	Mar	Apr	May	Jun	Jul	Aug	Sep	Oct	Nov	Dec	Year
Record high °C (°F)	4.8 (40.6)	6.0 (42.8)	16.5 (61.7)	29.0 (84.2)	34.8 (94.6)	35.3 (95.5)	37.2 (99.0)	34.1 (93.4)	31.0 (87.8)	24.2 (75.6)	13.8 (56.8)	6.1 (43.0)	37.2 (99.0)
Mean daily maximum °C (°F)	−11.7 (10.9)	−8.0 (17.6)	−0.5 (31.1)	8.4 (47.1)	16.7 (62.1)	22.9 (73.2)	24.7 (76.5)	21.9 (71.4)	14.6 (58.3)	6.2 (43.2)	−4.2 (24.4)	−9.5 (14.9)	6.8 (44.2)
Daily mean °C (°F)	−15.3 (4.5)	−12.2 (10.0)	−5.1 (22.8)	3.1 (37.6)	10.4 (50.7)	16.8 (62.2)	19.0 (66.2)	16.2 (61.2)	9.4 (48.9)	2.2 (36.0)	−7.6 (18.3)	−13.0 (8.6)	2.0 (35.6)
Mean daily minimum °C (°F)	−18.3 (−0.9)	−15.5 (4.1)	−9.0 (15.8)	−1.1 (30.0)	5.3 (41.5)	11.7 (53.1)	14.1 (57.4)	11.8 (53.2)	5.6 (42.1)	−0.7 (30.7)	−10.5 (13.1)	−16.1 (3.0)	−1.9 (28.6)
Record low °C (°F)	−59.9 (−75.8)	−45.4 (−49.7)	−42.1 (−43.8)	−27.9 (−18.2)	−19.2 (−2.6)	−3.8 (25.2)	−0.5 (31.1)	−2.8 (27.0)	−10.0 (14.0)	−34.1 (−29.4)	−45.8 (−50.4)	−48.3 (−54.9)	−59.9 (−75.8)
Average precipitation mm (inches)	17 (0.7)	14 (0.6)	16 (0.6)	25 (1.0)	42 (1.7)	64 (2.5)	59 (2.3)	70 (2.8)	52 (2.0)	40 (1.6)	34 (1.3)	29 (1.1)	462 (18.2)
Average precipitation days	16.0	12.7	11.9	12.0	13.5	13.9	13.1	15.1	14.5	16.5	18.5	17.6	175.2
Mean monthly sunshine hours	60	104	168	204	241	285	301	239	155	89	53	40	1,939
Source 1: Pogoda.ru.net
Source 2: climatebase.ru (precipitation days, sun 1900-2012)
