= Bely Iyus =

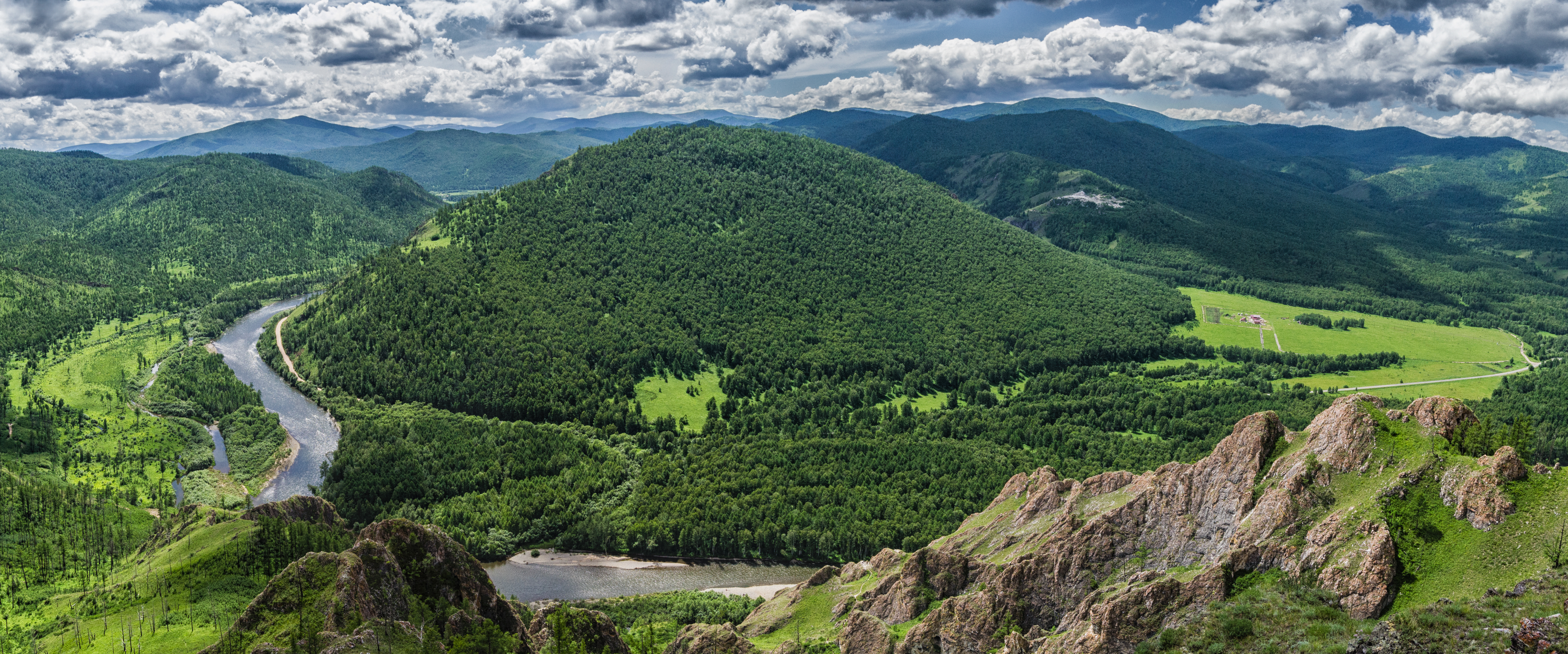
- Bely Iyus river near the Efremkino village

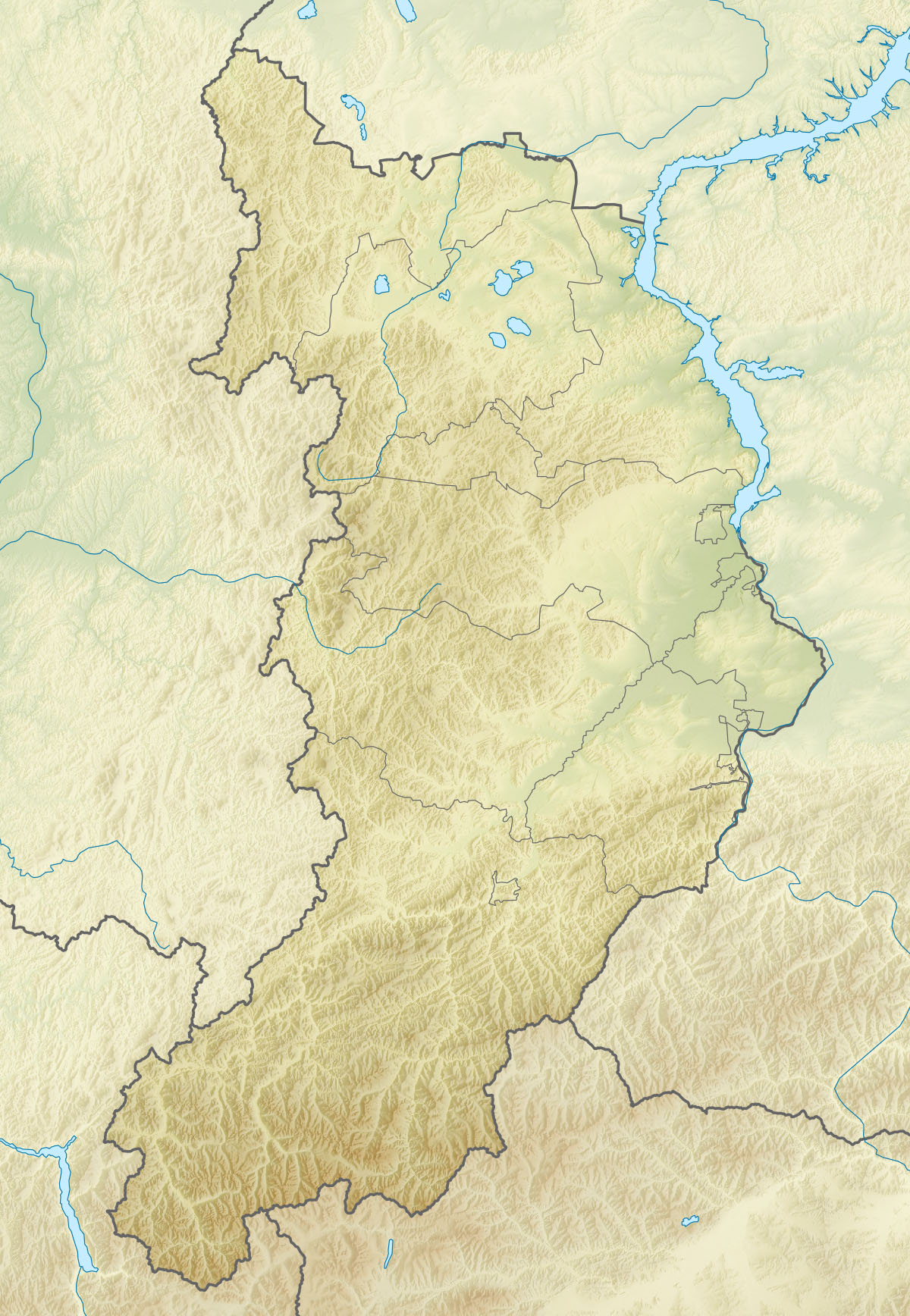
- Location within Khakassia Location within Russia
- Etymology: Khakas: Ах-Ӱӱс, romanized: Ax-Üüs, lit. 'White River' Russian: Белый Июс, romanized: Bely Iyus, lit. 'White Iyus'

Location
- Country: Russia
- Region: Khakassia

Physical characteristics
- Source: Kuznetsk Alatau
  - location: Shirinsky
  - coordinates: 54°06′47″N 89°06′25″E
  - elevation: 1,161 m (3,809 ft)
- Mouth: Chulym
  - location: Malyi Siutik,
  - coordinates: 54°56′26″N 89°49′53″E
  - elevation: 382 m (1,253 ft)
- Length: 224 km (139 mi)
- Basin size: 5,370 km^{2} (2,070 sq mi)

Basin features
- Progression: Chulym→ Ob→ Kara Sea
- Tributaries
  - left: Kizilka, Malaya Syya, Bolshaya Syya (Right Syya), Yzykhchul (Izykchul), Sarygchul, Berendzhak, Ipchul, Andat, Tyukhterek
  - right: Tyurim, Aspad, Shablyk, Tunguzhul, Kharatas (Karatash, Kara-Tas), Turalyg

The Bely Iyus (ru: Белый Июс, romanized: Bely Iyus, lit. 'White Iyus') is a river in the Republic of Khakassia in Russia. It is the right source river of the Chulym. It is 224 kilometres (139 mi) long, with a drainage basin of 5,370 square kilometres (2,070 mi^{2}).

== Etymology ==
Also known as Bjeloj Ijus, Bieloi Yious, Khakas: Ах-Ӱӱс, romanized: Ax-Üüs, lit. 'White River'.

An analysis of the toponymy of the Khakass-Minusinsk basin and the areas adjacent to it indicates that, along with the stratified Turkic toponyms of a later origin, toponyms clarified from the Ugric and Samoyedic languages dominated here.

The inhabitants of the Urals call the rivers flowing to the West White rivers; those that flow to the East or to Siberia, in Black rivers.

== Description ==
The Bely Iyus has its sources on the eastern slopes of the Kuznetsk Alatau, at an elevation of 712 metres (2,336 ft), The sources are small mountain lake in a spur of the Kuznetsk Alatau, in the high Karlykhan Range (up to 6000 feet). Source of Bely Iyus is mainly snow. In the upper reaches (to the village of Efremkino) of the Bely Iyus it is called Pikhterek and has the character of a fast mountain river, but not deep and in summer there are fords everywhere. In the middle reaches it flows among the hilly steppe spaces of the western outskirts of the Chulym-Yenisei basin, strongly meandering channel, swampy valley. The density of the river network is 0.5–0.7 km/km^{2}. Drain module - 5-10 liters / (sec × km^{2}).

At the village of Maly Syutik it joins the Cherny Iyus (or Black Iyus), the left source river of the Chulym. The Chulym together with the Bely Iyus is 2,023 kilometres (1,257 mi) long, and is thus one of Siberia's main rivers. The main tributaries of the first order: the left ones are Tyukhterek, Bolshaya Syya, Malaya Syya, Targa, Chernaya, etc.; right - Kharatas, Tunguzhul, Shablyk, Tyurim, etc.

Floatable river. It flows through the territory of and Shirinsky districts, Ust-Abakansky district, Sorsk, Ordzhonikidzevsky District. There are more than 10 settlements in the valley: Berenzhak, Mendol, Malaya Syya, Efremkino, Bely Balakhchin, Iyus, Solenoozernoye, etc.

The rocks that accompany the Bely Iyus River from the peaks to the mouth of the Tarcha River are predominantly granite-syenites and limestones; below the mouth of this river, breccias, conglomerates, porphyrites, and then sandstones protrude. Clay-calcareous porphyry also appears on the White Iyus River.

In the area of the villages of Efremkino and Malaya Syya, on an area of 40-50 thousand hectares, there are exotic rock outcrops, caves: Pandora's Box, Archaeological, etc. historical monuments (an ancient human settlement, rock paintings).

The Iyussky Reserve located on the eastern slope of the Kuznetsk Alatau, in the basin of the middle course of the Bely Iyus River, Shirinsky District, Khakassia. The Iyussky Reserve has been established to protect cave complexes, biocenoses of the forest and subtaiga zone, habitats of ungulates, nesting sites of rare birds of prey, for organized cultural leisure of the population (ecological and tourist routes, visiting caves, etc.).

In the upper reaches of the White Iyus, gold is mined (Kommunar, Berenzhak). With the development of the mining industry, the productivity of the fish stock in Bely Iyus has decreased significantly. There was not enough grayling, lenok, taimen, and nelma practically disappeared.

== Tributaries (km from mouth) ==
17 km: Kizilka river (left)

69 km: unnamed river (left)

88 km: Tyurim river (right)

125 km: Malaya Syya river (left)

131 km: river Bolshaya Syya (Right Syya) (left)

134 km: Aspad river (right)

138 km: river Yzykhchul (Izykchul) (lv)

138 km: Sarygchul river (left)

143 km: Shablyk river (right)

154 km: Tunguzhul river (right)

172 km: Berendzhak river (left)

172 km: Ipchul river (left)

172 km: Kharatas river (Karatash, Kara-Tas) (right)

179 km: Andat river (left)

182 km: Tyukhterek river (left)

192 km: Turalyg river (right)

== State Water registry data ==
According to the state water register of Russia, it belongs to the Upper Ob basin district, the water management section of the river is the Chulym from the city of Achinsk to the water metering station of the village of Zyryanskoye, the river sub-basin of the river is the Chulym. The river basin of the river - (Upper) Ob to the confluence of the Irtysh.

== History ==
In the vicinity of the village of Malaya Syya (Shirinsky district) on the banks of the White Iyus, there is the earliest settlement of Homo sapiens on the territory of Khakassia, the Paleolithic site of Malaya Syya (30-35 thousand years ago), where drilled jewelry processed with incisors was found

Radlov Vasily Vasilievich (Friedrich Wilhelm Radloff) in his travel notes noted the statue that Daniel Gottlieb Messerschmidt found on the Ak-Iyus (Khakas: Ах-Ӱӱс ), which, in appearance, quite corresponds to the stone women (Russian: каменные бабы) of the southern Russian steppes.

== See also ==
- List of rivers of Russia
