= Ordzhonikidzevsky District, Republic of Khakassia =

Ordzhonikidzevsky District Орджоникидзевский район (Russian)
- District

Other transcription(s)
  - Khakas: Орджоникидзе аймағы
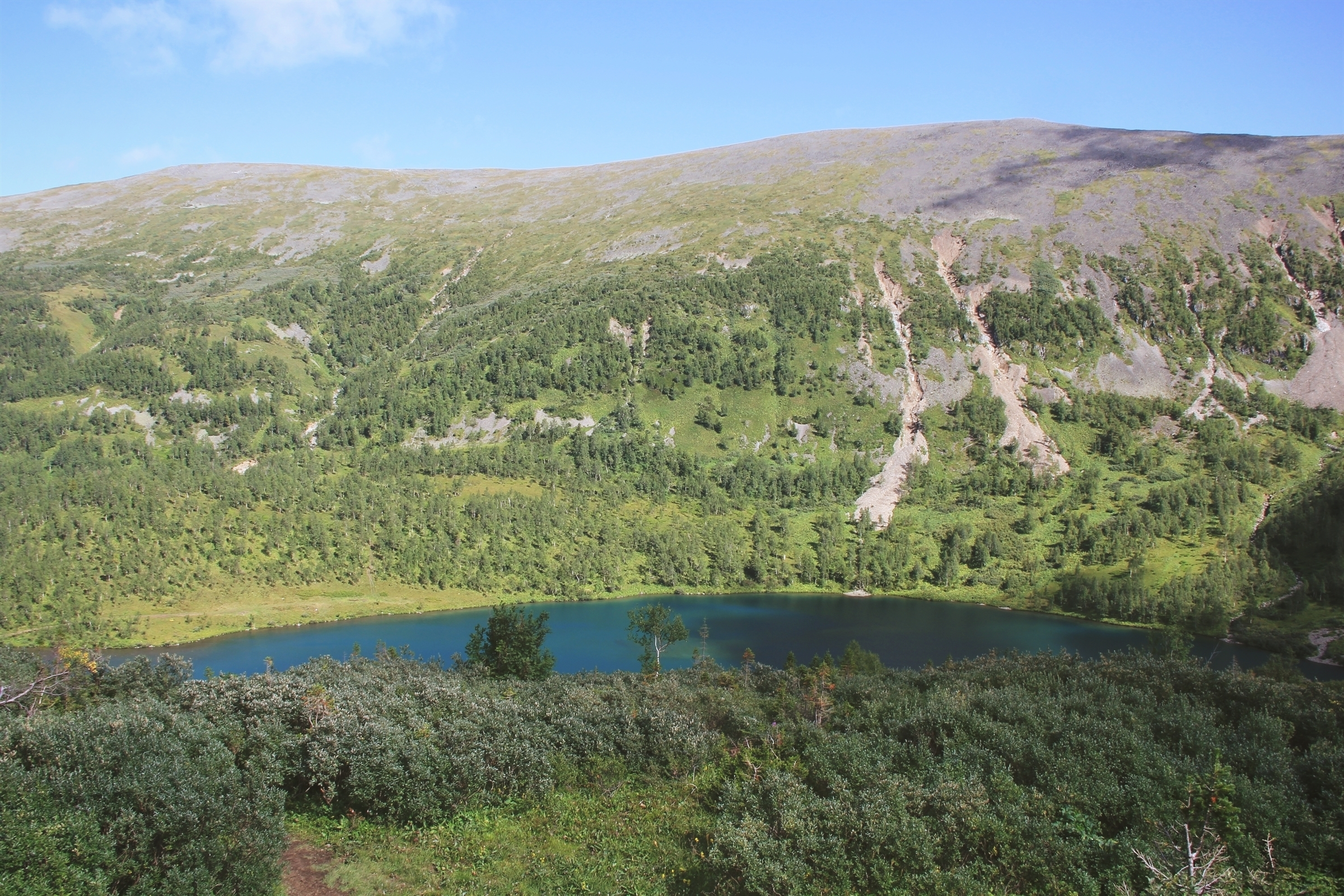
- Lake Ivanovo, Ordzhonikidzevsky District

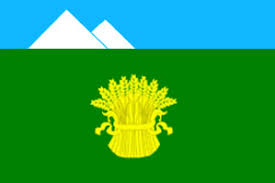
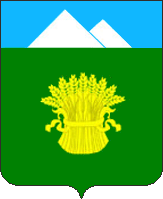
- Flag Coat of arms
- Location of Ordzhonikidzevsky District in the Republic of Khakassia
- Coordinates: 54.851°N 88.332°E
- Country: Russia
- Federal subject: Republic of Khakassia
- Established: 1930
- Administrative center: Kopyovo

Area
  - Total: 6,620 km^{2} (2,560 sq mi)

Population (2010 Census)
  - Total: 12,841
  - Density: 1.94/km^{2} (5.02/sq mi)
  - Urban: 0%
  - Rural: 100%

Administrative structure
  - Administrative divisions: 8 selsoviet, 1 settlement council
  - Inhabited localities: 23 rural localities

Municipal structure
  - Municipally incorporated as: Ordzhonikidzevsky Municipal District
  - Municipal divisions: 0 urban settlements, 9 rural settlements
- Time zone: UTC+7 (MSK+4)
- OKTMO ID: 95620000
- Website: http://www.or19.ru/

Ordzhonikidzevsky District (Russian: Орджоники́дзевский райо́н; Khakas: Орджоникидзе аймағы, Orconikidze aymağı) is an administrative and municipal district (raion), one of the eight in the Republic of Khakassia, Russia. It is located in the north of the republic. The area of the district is 6,620 square kilometers (2,560 sq mi). Its administrative center is the rural locality (a settlement) of Kopyovo. Population: 12,841 (2010 census); 15,779 (2002 census); 19,414 (1989 Soviet census). The population of the administrative center accounts for 34.3% of the district's total population.
