= Shirinsky District =

Shirinsky District Ширинский район (Russian)
- District

Other transcription(s)
  - Khakas: Сыра аймағы
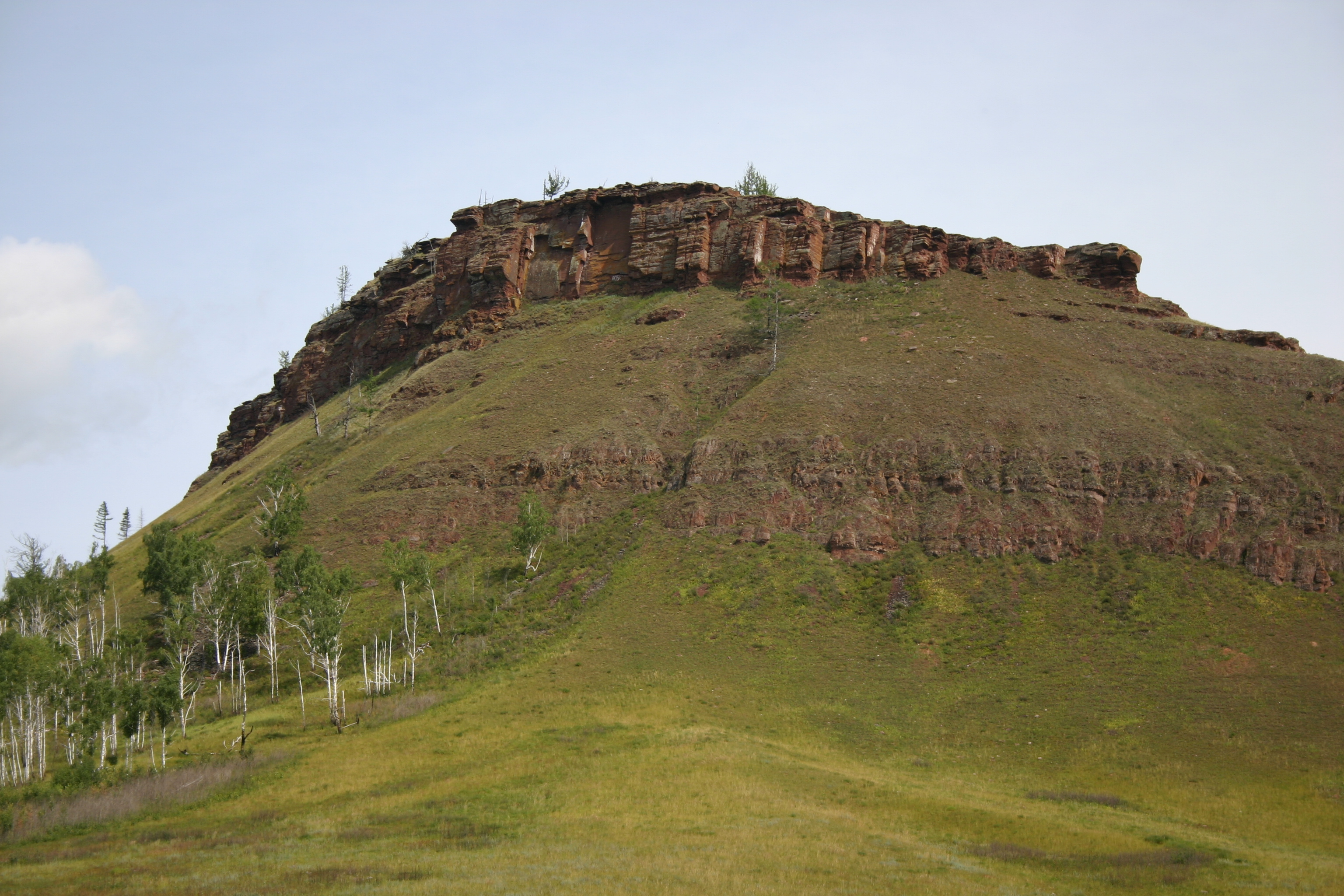
- Ruins of the Chebaki Fortress near the village of Chebaki in Shirinsky District

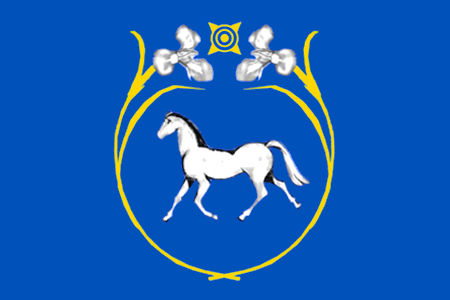
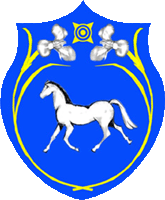
- Flag Coat of arms
- Location of Shirinsky District in the Republic of Khakassia
- Coordinates: 54.436°N 88.693°E
- Country: Russia
- Federal subject: Republic of Khakassia
- Established: 1930
- Administrative center: Shira

Area
  - Total: 6,880 km^{2} (2,660 sq mi)

Population (2010 Census)
  - Total: 29,371
  - Density: 4.27/km^{2} (11.1/sq mi)
  - Urban: 2.8%
  - Rural: 97.2%

Administrative structure
  - Administrative divisions: 15 selsoviet
  - Inhabited localities: 38 rural localities

Municipal structure
  - Municipally incorporated as: Shirinsky Municipal District
  - Municipal divisions: 0 urban settlements, 15 rural settlements
- Time zone: UTC+7 (MSK+4)
- OKTMO ID: 95635000
- Website: http://www.shiranet.ru/

Shirinsky District (Russian: Шири́нский райо́н; Khakas: Сыра аймағы, Sıra aymağı) is an administrative and municipal district (raion), one of the eight in the Republic of Khakassia, Russia. It is located in the north of the republic. The area of the district is 6,880 square kilometers (2,660 sq mi). Its administrative center is the rural locality (a selo) of Shira. Population: 29,371 (2010 census); 31,720 (2002 census); 39,385 (1989 Soviet census). The population of Shira accounts for 32.2% of the district's total population.
