= Minusinsk Regional Museum =

Museum in Minusinsk, Russia

Coordinates: 53.70988°N 91.68866°E

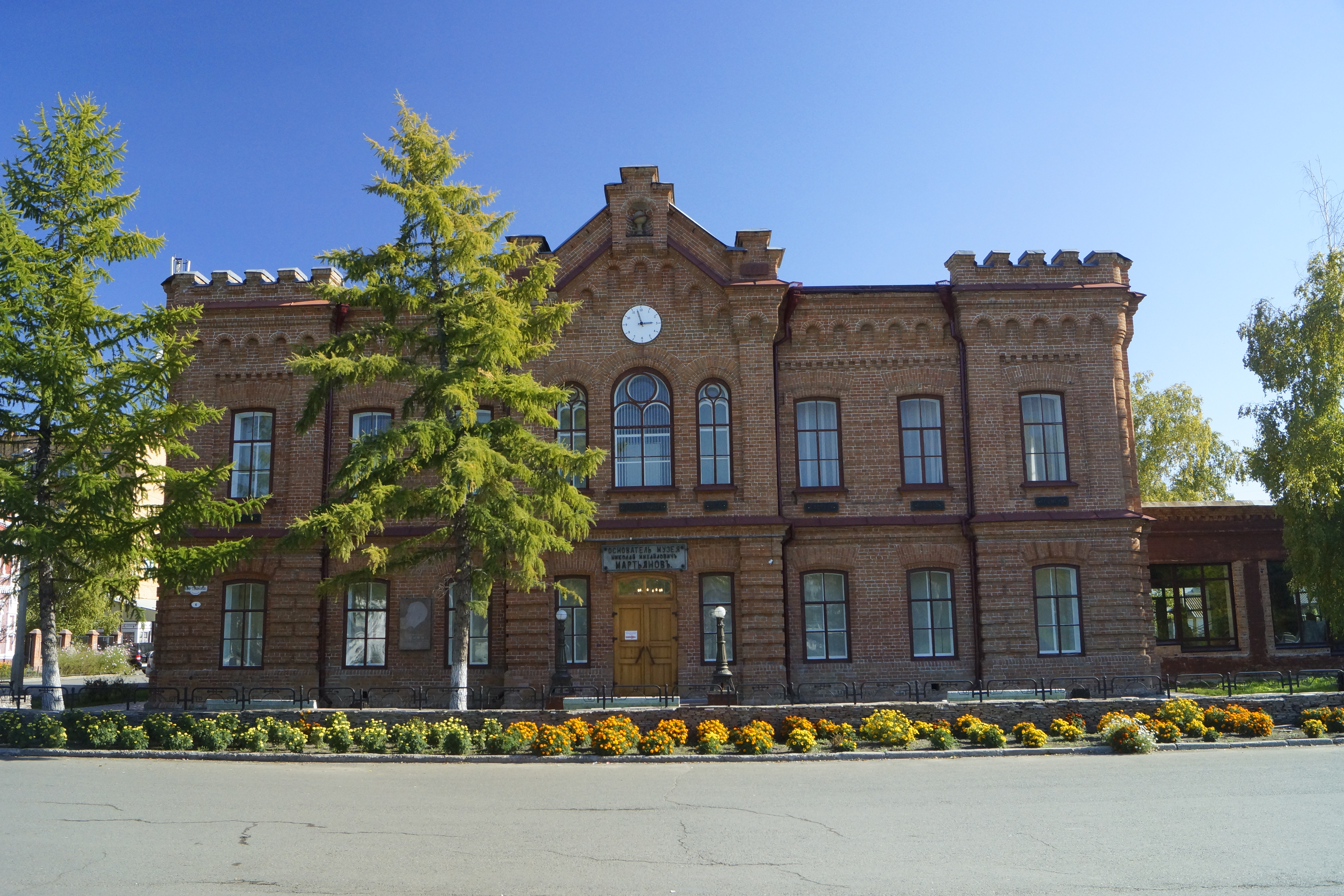
Minusinsk Regional Museum

The Minusinsk Regional Museum, also Museum of Local Lore in Minusinsk or Martyanov Museum, is a museum in the city of Minusinsk, Russia. It was created in 1877 by a chemist and collector Nickolai Martyanov, who had a collection of unique archeological finds discovered in the Minusinsk Hollow. The museum received a silver medal in the World Exhibition in Paris in 1900.

The museum has a large collection of artifacts from the Minusinsk Bronze and Iron Ages, dating to the Afanasievo culture, the Okunev culture, the Andronovo culture, the Karasuk culture, the Tagar culture and the post-Tagar period.

The museum also has collections of Chinese Middle Age mirrors, Chinese coins of 5th-19th centuries, and works of art from Tuva and Khakassia.

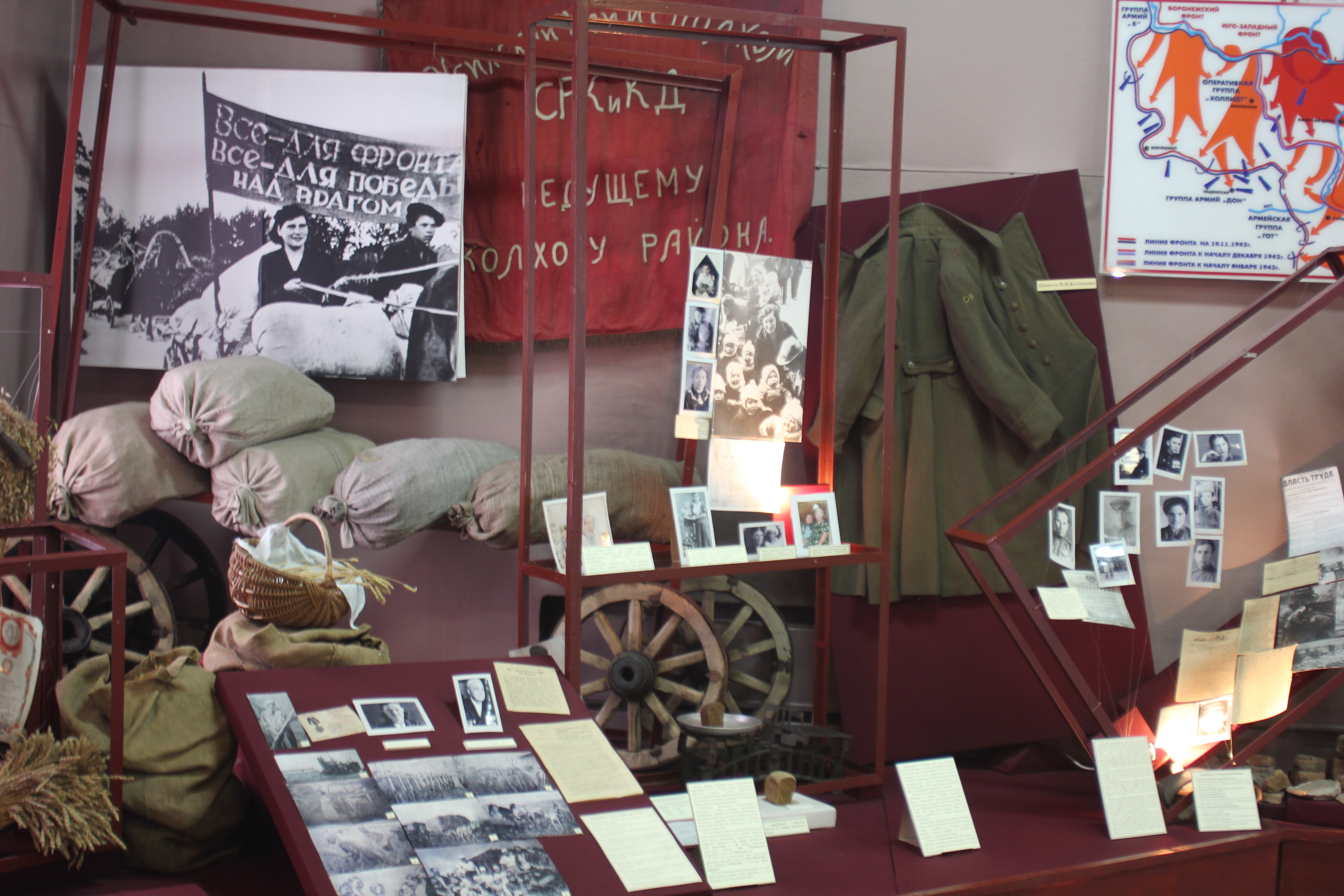
Exhibit of modern history

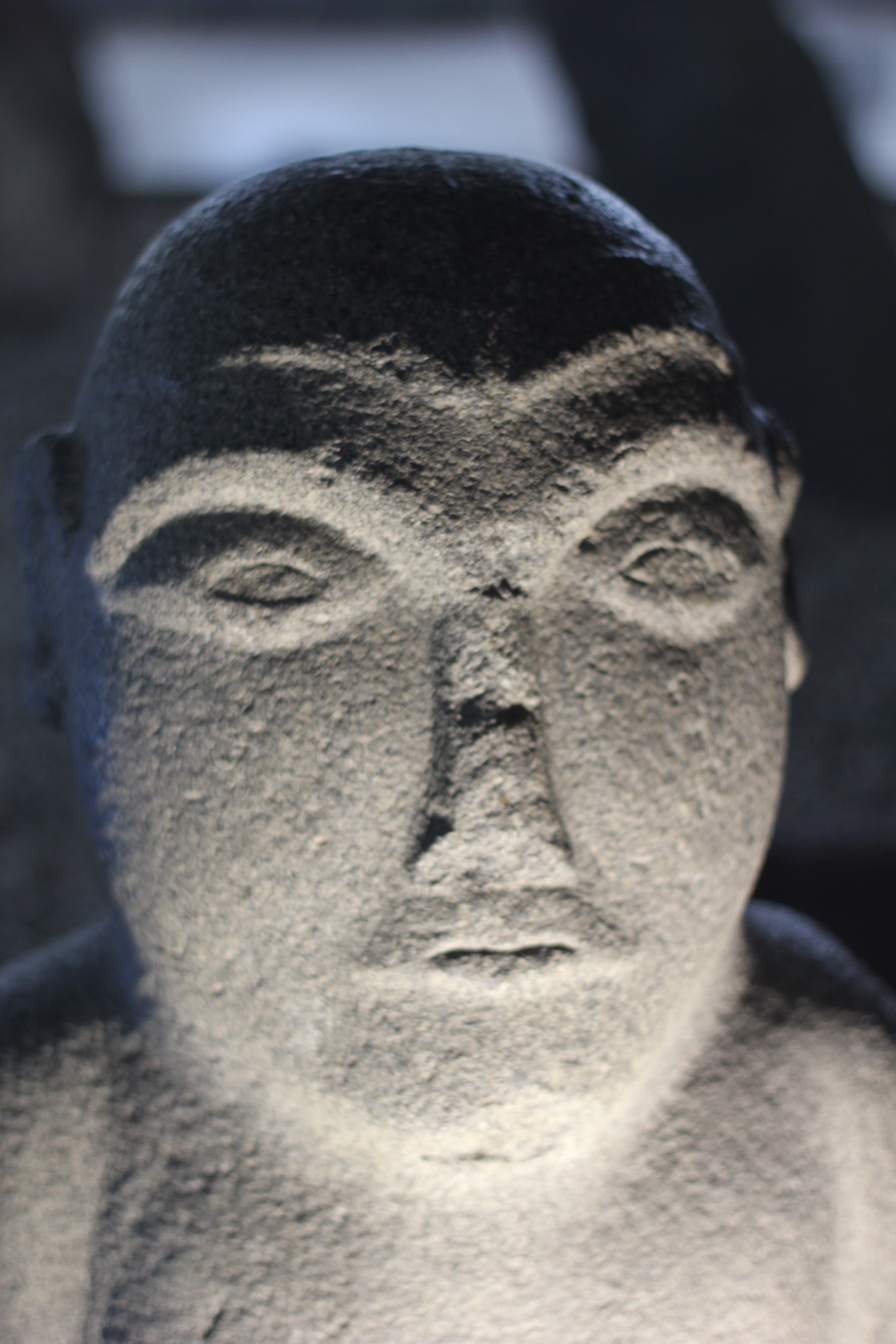
Turkic balbal statue

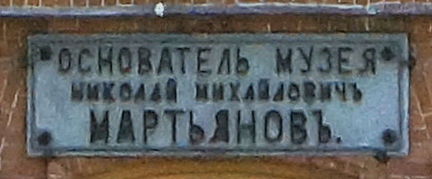
Entrance plaque: "Founder of the Museum: Nikolay Mikhaolovich Martyanov"
