= Khakassia National Museum =

Museum in Abakan, Khakassia, Russia

Coordinates: 53.720434°N 91.474425°E

The Khakassia National Museum is a museum located in Abakan, in the Minusinsk Hollow, Russia. It is located Ulitsa Pushkina, 28А Abakan, Respúblika Khakásiya, Russia, 655012.

The museum is especially known for its collection of monumental statues from the Okunev culture.

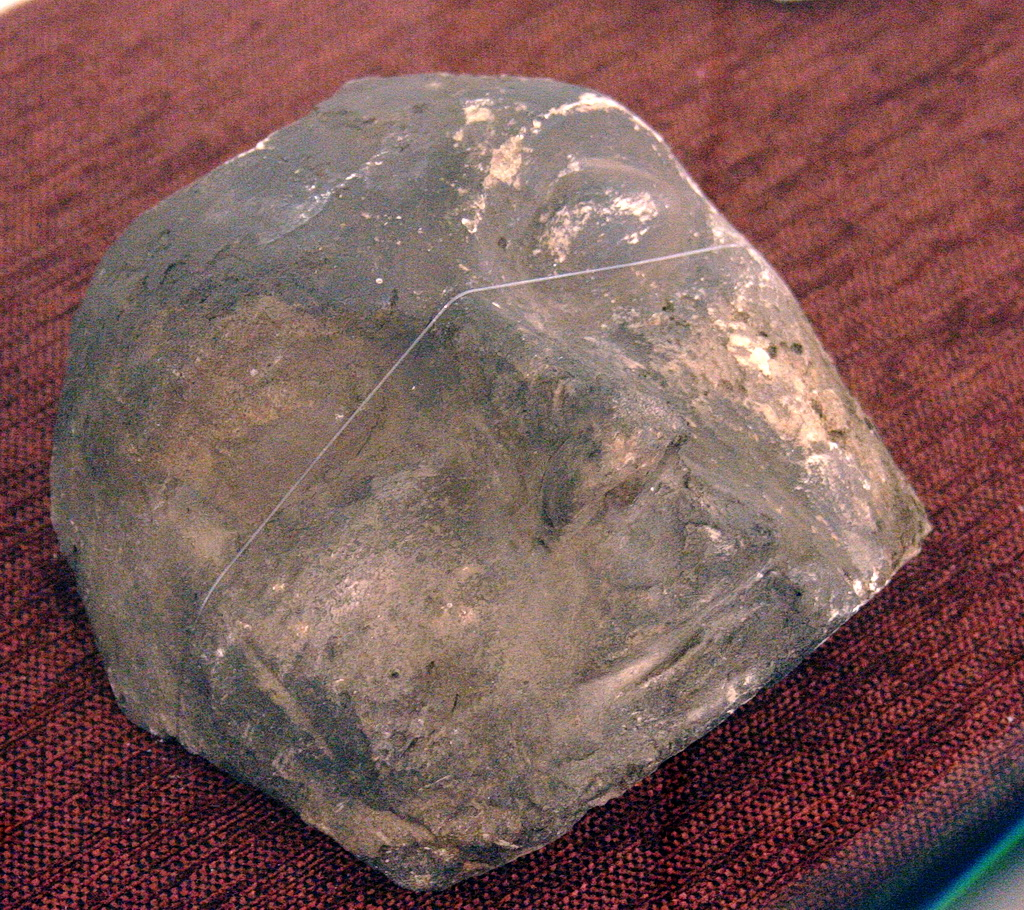
Tashtyk culture mask, Khakassia National Museum.

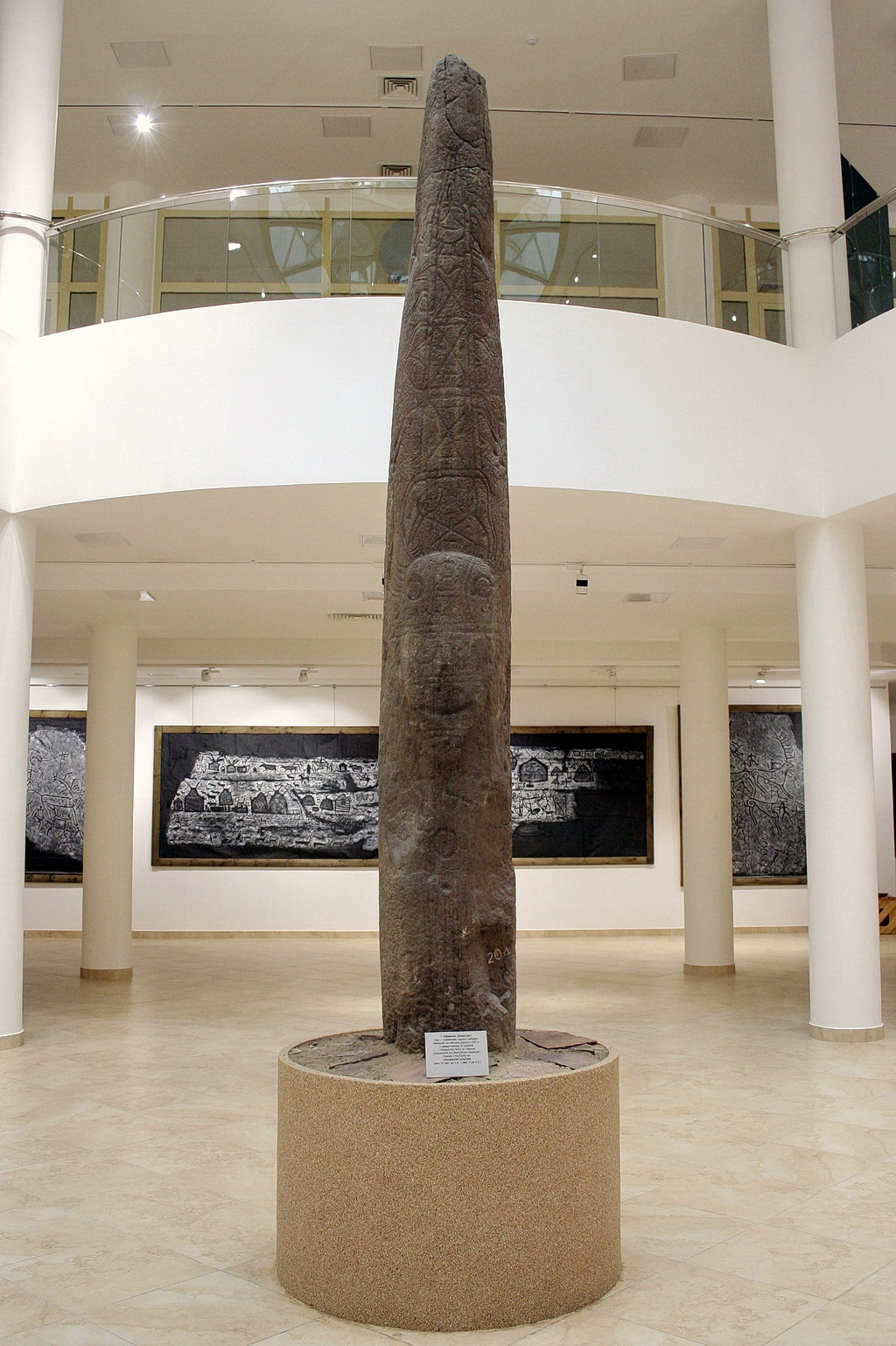
Okunev stela, Khakassia Museum.

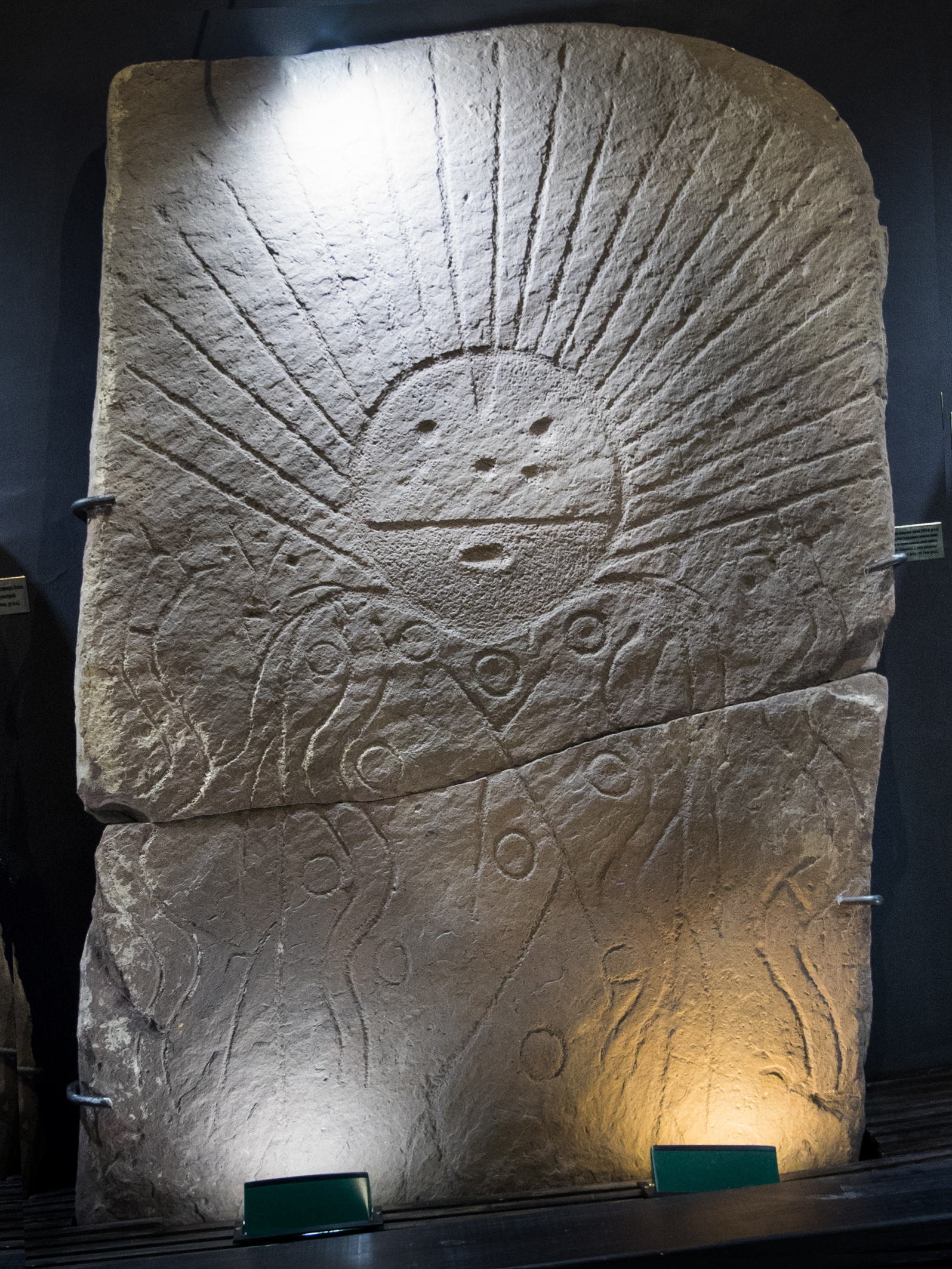
The "Ankhakov Stela".

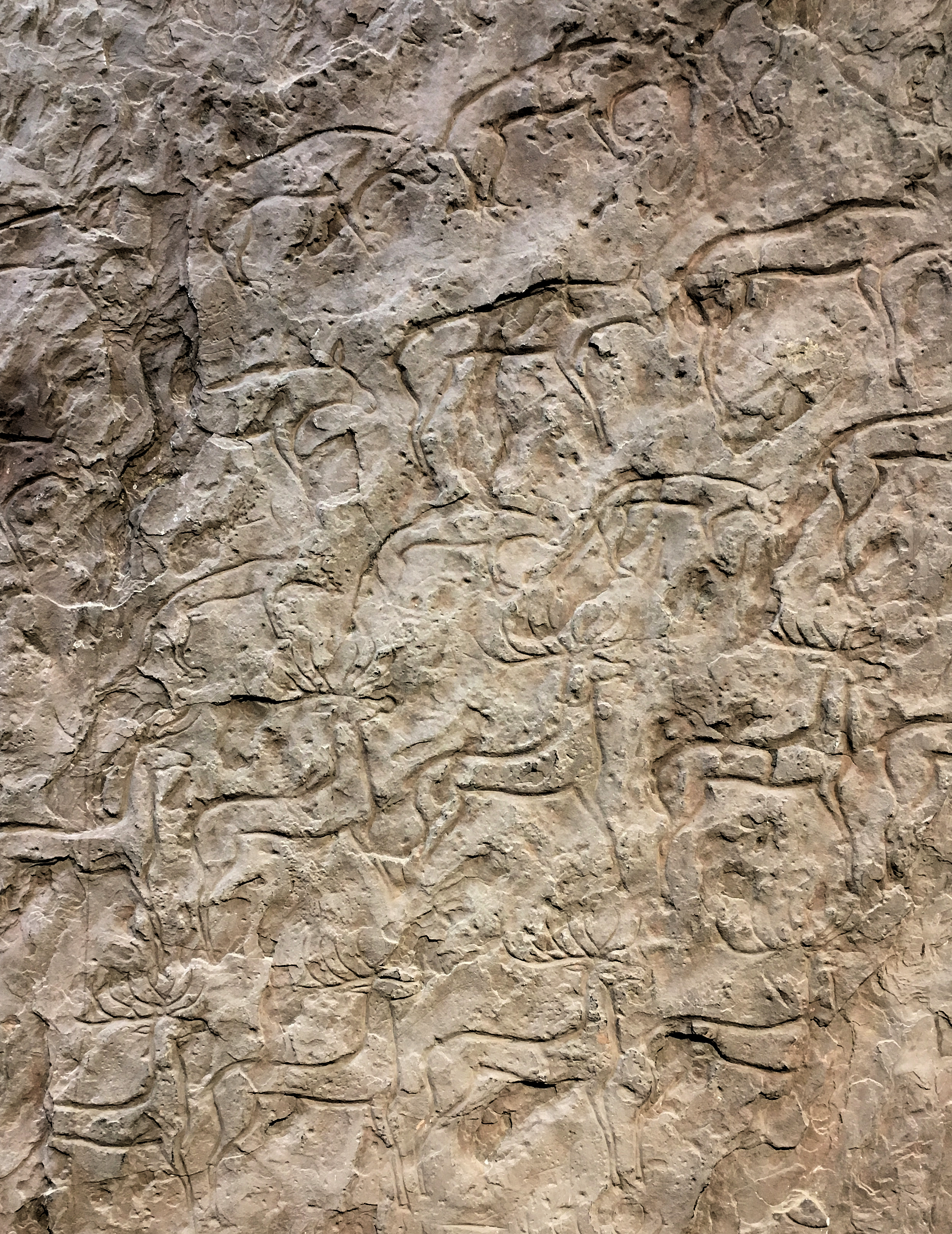
The "Stela of Kopyonsky Chaatas".
