= Lake Shira =

Meromictic lake in Russia

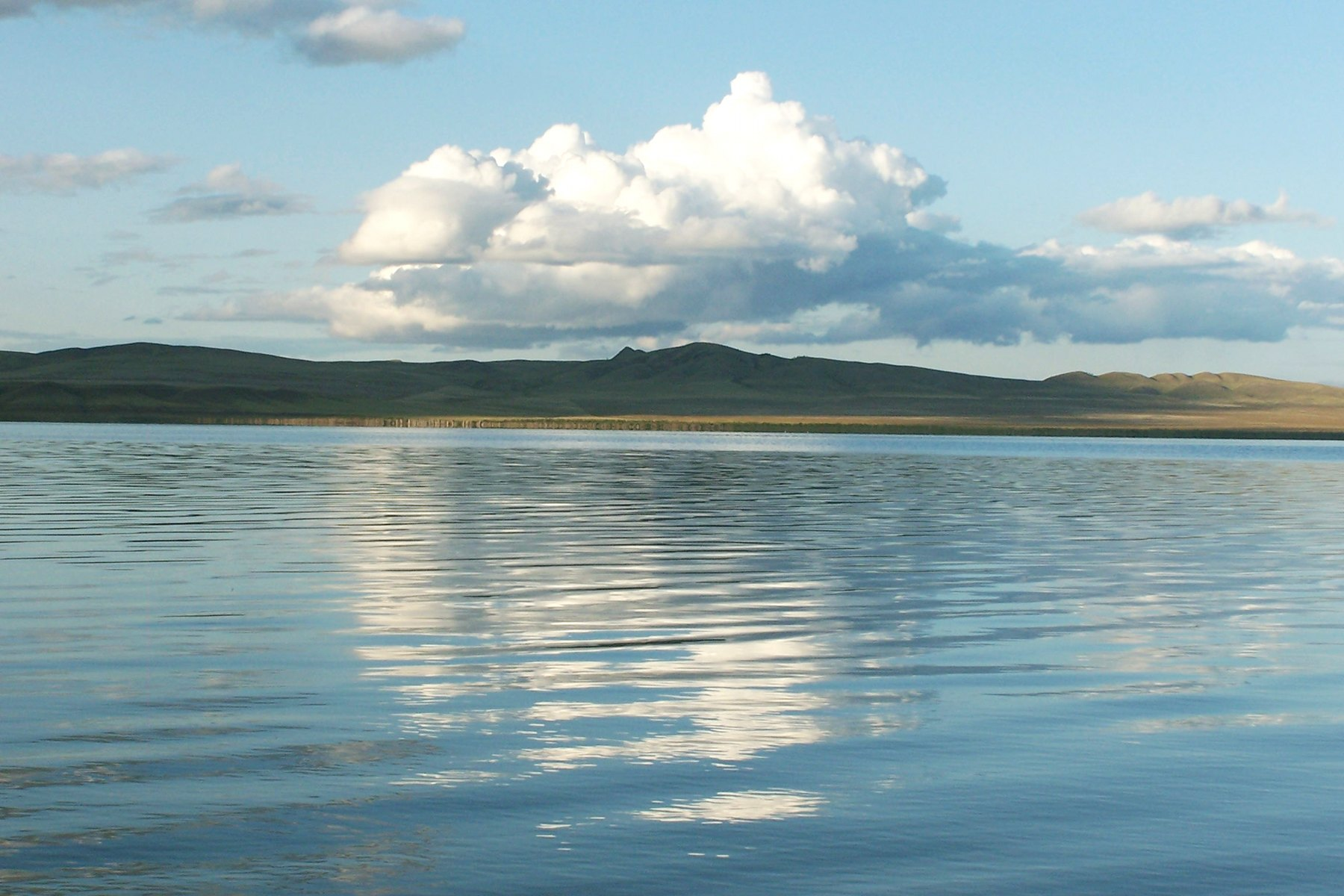

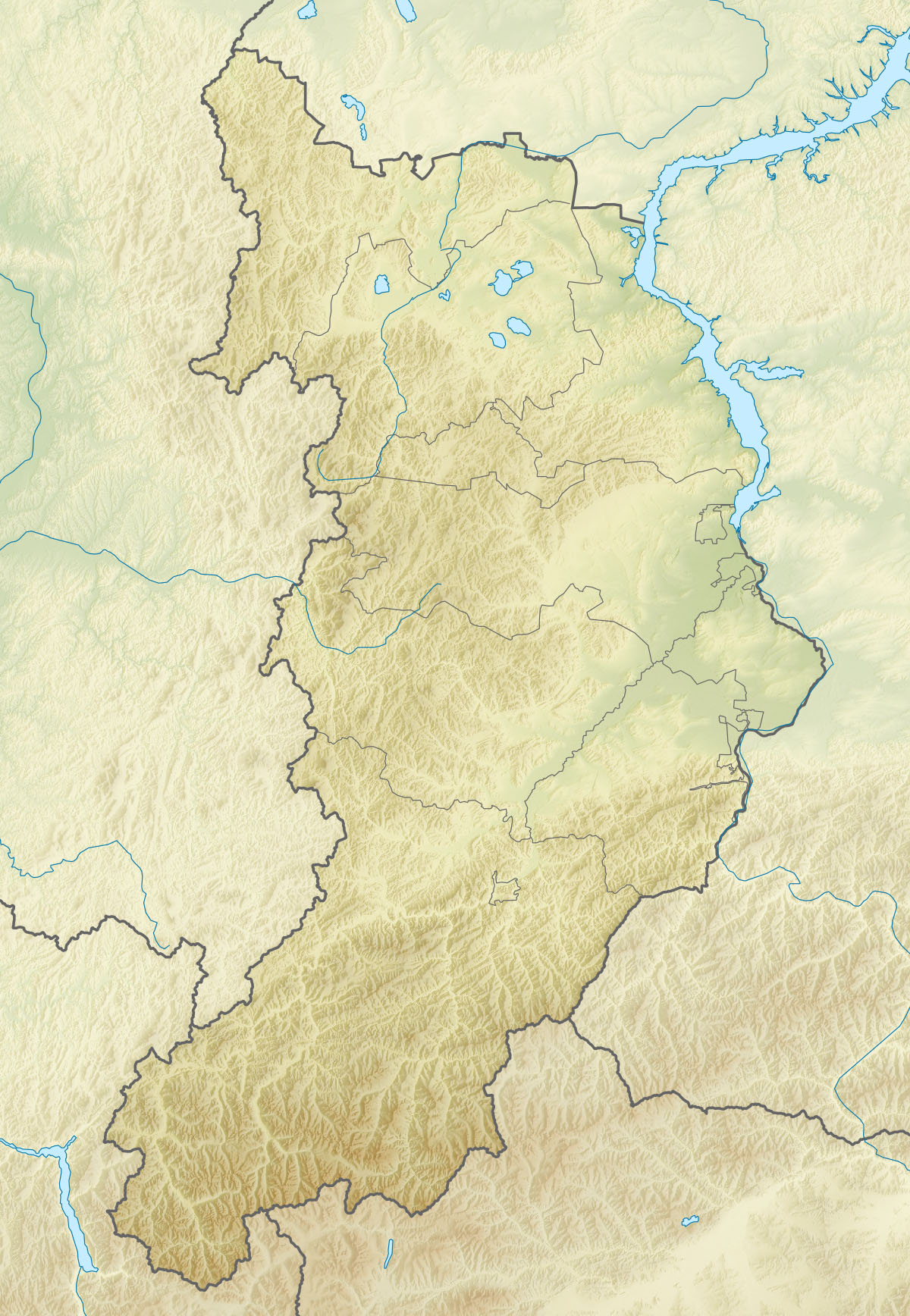
- Location within Khakassia
- Location: Republic of Khakassia
- Coordinates: 54°30′38″N 90°12′09″E
- Type: meromictic, saline
- Basin countries: Russia
- Max. length: 9.5 km (5.9 mi)
- Max. width: 5 km (3.1 mi)
- Surface area: 35.9 km^{2} (13.9 sq mi)
- Max. depth: 23 m (75 ft)
- Surface elevation: 353 m (1,158 ft)

Lake Shira is a meromictic lake (the water layers do not mix), located in the Republic of Khakassia, Russia. The lake covers an area of 39.5 km^{2} (15.3 sq mi) in a steppe landscape in the Minusinsk Hollow. Its height above sea level is 353 m (1,158 ft), in a relatively flat intermountain area 160 km northwest of the city of Abakan. The village after which it is named, Shira, is 12 kilometers (7.5 mi) to the west. The southern and western shores feature beaches popular for local recreation (the bottom is sandy), and spas that take advantage of the mineral water. Lake Shira is a salt lake with a high magnesium content. It has one small river providing inflow, but no outflow, although, geographically, the lake is in the Yenisei River basin. The northern shore is protected by the Khakasski Nature Reserve.

== Etymology ==
Russian: Oзеро Шира, romanized: Ozero Shira, lit. 'Lake Shira', in the old transcription Lake Shiro, Korzukhin I.A. defines the meaning in Russian as "iron lake", according to Butanaev comes from Khakas: Syra Köl, lit. 'Medicinal Lake'. According to the linguist Katanov Khakas: Syra Köl, lit. 'Yellow Lake', perhaps the general yellow color around the lake served as the basis for the name. Lake Shiro lies in a basin, surrounded by low treeless hills covered with sparse grassy vegetation, yellow soil shines through from under the grassy cover of the hills.

== Geography ==
Lake Shira is located in the northwestern part of Khakassia on the right side of Bely Iyus river, north of a high hilly ridge running from the peaks of Uibat to the banks of the Yenisei, in a shallow intermountain depression in the North Minusinsk basin (Chulym-Yenisei basin) 340 km to the south - west of Krasnoyarsk, 160 km northwest of Abakan, 15 km east along the road from Shira railway station in the village of the same name Shira, the center of the district.

4 km to the west of the lake is the freshwater lake Itkul, 9 km to the north lies the largest mineral reservoir of Khakassia - Lake Belyo, and a number of lakes: Tustu-Kul, Fyrkal, Matarakovo, Kyzyn-Kul, Bei-buluk, Krasnoye, Gorkoye, Utinoye, Sobachye, Spirino, Shunet (more than 50). From the elevation of the Cross Mountain near Lake Shira, one can see up to nine lakes, at a short distance from each other. The valley of Lake Shira and its surrounding areas belong to a series of red Devonian strata.

The reservoir is surrounded by forest-steppe with soft outlines of distant foothills. The banks of the Shira Lake are treeless, aside from the western part which has small birch groves. The bottom of the lake rises in ledges to gently sloping sandy shores, forming comfortable beaches. A rare combination of dry steppe climate and lake air creates a unique, healing climate.

The peculiarity of the geological origin and specific climatic conditions predetermined a special scientific and educational interest in this territory. The lake is one of the water bodies, the study of which is the subject of an international program. On its shores, there is a scientific station of the Institute of Biophysics of the Siberian Branch of the Russian Academy of Sciences. In the immediate vicinity are field training bases of the leading universities of Tomsk, Krasnoyarsk and Novosibirsk. The results of many years of modern research on the territory of the Lake Shira site in the Khakassia Nature Reserve were carried out and summarized by a team of authors in published scientific materials.

Lake Shira is drainless and, as a result, accumulates pollutants that enter it with surface runoff, with flushing from adjacent territories, as well as those brought by the river flowing into it and atmospheric precipitation. Comprehensive studies on the territory of the Lake Shira site commissioned by the Khakassia Nature Reserve showed that organic pollution of the waters of Lake Shira is a typical picture characteristic of areas with a moderate anthropogenic load and reflects the state of the zone actively used for recreational purposes. The waters near the resort complex are moderately polluted. The contents of the main organic impurities do not exceed the MPC values for general cultural and economic water bodies, but the concentrations of some organic substances found in water samples are quite high and indicate an unfavorable environmental situation. Scientific studies have suggested:

Given the uniqueness of the Shira Lake complex, not only on the scale of the Republic of Khakassia, but throughout the Russian Federation, it seems appropriate to declare a special regime for nature management in this territory.

— The team of authors, ed. V.V. Nepomniachtchi, Natural complex and biodiversity of Lake Shira in the Khakassia Nature Reserve

On the western shore of the lake is the village of Zhemchuzhny, with the sanatoriums of the Lake Shira Resort located here.

In the vicinity of the Shira, there are a large number of memorial steles and menhirs. In the memoirs of Martyanov N.N., it is mentioned that the Tatars saw the ruins of houses and walls at the bottom of the Shira Lake.

== Physical properties ==
The surface area is 35.9 km^{2} (13.9 sq mi). The area of the drainage basin is 1020 km². The length of the lake from northwest to southeast is 9.5 km (5.9 mi), the maximum width is 5 km (3.1 mi). The length of the coastline is 24.5 km. Depths: maximum depth - 24 m, average depth - 11 m.

Shira is a slightly saline lake, despite the fact that the small river, Son, flows into it from the southeast, the mouth of which is a swampy lowland. The composition of lake water is slightly alkaline, sulfate-chloride, sodium-potassium, with a high content of magnesium. The salt content throughout the lake is not the same, the highest in the central part.

== History ==
For the first time, the bitter-salty Lake Shira was described by Academician Peter Simon Pallas as early as the 18th century, when he traveled around Siberia. The healing properties of the lake water have become widely known since the second half of the 19th century; though local residents have long known about its healing properties and considered it sacred. The lake was in the possession of the Tatar Thorin before the formation of the resort, according to D. A. Klementz An active participant in the organization of the resort and contributing to the growth of its popularity was the Tomsk gold merchant Z. M. Tsibulsky in 1873.

According to local legend, Tsibulsky drew attention to the fact that his dog, accidentally wounded while they were hunting near the lake, was left to a local resident near the lake. The dog went swimming in the lake, and his wound was healed. The dog ran back home completely healthy. Then Tsibulsky tried to treat his chronic sciatica with baths from the lake and got rid of the disease.

Since the end of the 19th century, the study of the chemical composition of the local mineral lakes of the entire Shira basin was carried out by doctor Sergey Elpatyevsky (1886), professors Müller, E.A. Leman (1890), E. V. Werner (1895). On the recommendation of the Military Medical Inspector of the Siberian Military District, Privy Councilor E. P. Kazan, research was conducted by N. S. Kastorsky (1907), D. P. Turbaba (1904), doctor R. K. Pikok (1876, 1889), chemist and geologist professor Zalesky S. Scientific research determined the healing properties of the mineral water of Lake Shira. Water is more accurately attributed to at least two: alkaline-Gauber and bitter springs; according to the content of magnesia sulphate, the water of the lake should be attributed to the famous "bitter waters" of Franz Josef and Guniyadi-Janos. Lake Shira benefits even more from the fact that in its neighborhood, there is Lake Shunet with its mud-rich brine that meets all the conditions of mineral mud.

On February 1, 1891, Lake Shira became a resort, and the construction of state and private buildings began here. Staying on the lake was expensive, and therefore, only wealthy people came here for treatment - officials, merchants, military, clergy, nobles, philistine homeowners and wealthy peasants.

In 1892, Vasily Ivanovich Surikov made a large number of studies and sketches in the summer in the vicinity of Lake Shira. In 1894, while working on the painting "Yermak's Conquest of Siberia" in the summer, Surikov traveled to Siberia along the Ob, the Yenisei and to Lake Shira.

In 1895, a Shelter for Poor Patients was opened on Lake Shira with funds raised in part by holding musical evenings. The writer of the city of Tomsk, A. N. Shipitsin, was an ardent initiator of this work. Gold miner I.M. Ivanitsky donated the largest yurt, which was moved to the shore, repaired, and divided into 5 rooms for 20 people. The shelter had a kitchen, a cellar and a bathhouse. Poor patients received, from the shelter, lighting, table, bed, baths, medicines and even koumis and massage.

In 1896, being a student, Skryabin K.I. who later became a famous biologist spent the summer on Lake Shira:

Lake Shira is a bitter-salty pool lying in a deserted steppe zone. On one of its banks, there were several houses that were rented out to visiting patients. This group of buildings was called the high-flown word "resort". There was not a single tree around the lake, which gave the whole area a particularly dull look.

— Skryabin K.I., About life and about myself. My life in science.

In 1897-1998, on the initiative of the committee of the shelter for the poor, the first bathroom building was opened, available to everyone for a fee (35 kopecks). It consisted of a reception room, two corridors and 10 small bathrooms.

In 1898, a resort was opened on the lake on the recommendation of the doctor and public figure I. T. Savenkov, and gradually the deserted shores of the lake turned into a comfortable resort.

Since the beginning of the 20th century, a number of health resorts have been established on the shores of the lake. On the southwestern shore of the lake, there is a balneotherapy ulus, in which there are rooms for visiting patients, baths and other buildings, since the lake was declared hydropathic and recognized as a resort, for the construction of which in 1901 the government allocated money. In the ulus, there are private houses, Tatar yurts, shops, a small church, a hotel, a kitchen and other buildings. At that time, the most convenient way to Lake Shira was through Krasnoyarsk. From Krasnoyarsk along the Yenisei to the Bateni pier they went on steamboats. The Batenevskaya pier was located three versts above the village of Bateni. For a long time, there was no house on this pier to wait for the steamer, and visitors to the resort went out and carried their luggage ashore under the open sky. A guest house was built on the pier by the State Property Department in the semi-mountain.

The doctor's reception room was located in the bathroom building of the Shira resort. Baths were not released without the doctor's permission. The doctor examined the sick and gave a ticket or a note that the patient did not suffer from contagious diseases. When visiting the bathroom building, queues were established, a list of which was posted in the reception room of the bathroom building. Mud was mined from Lake Shunet, which was used for baths and rubbing. It was mined from the bottom of the lake. Mineral mud - soft, greasy, black in color, with a strong smell of hydrogen sulfide, was brought in barrels to Lake Shira and sold for treatment at 10 kopecks per bucket. Some patients who have strong, healthy skin enhanced the effect of bathing in the lake by preliminary rubbing with Shira clay, the whole body or only sore spots. Then they sat in the sun for a while, and then they bathed. For the same purpose, some patients made compresses from clay or water.

Doctors advised all patients to spend more time outdoors and take at least short walks around the neighborhood. Vacationers walked on foot to the "Kamennyy Log", to the mounds, to the koumiss, to the Karysh River, were fond of duck hunting, had fun boating, fishing, horseback riding and riding in carriages - to Lake Itkul. For the entertainment of visitors to the resort, there were several pillars for the game of "giant steps". A playground was provided for children. For adults, a playground for playing lawn tennis, croquet, for which a special fee was taken by the hour. Vacationers staged performances and dance evenings. M. V. Krasnozhenova from the Krasnoyarsk Society of Dramatic Art Lovers was the initiator of staging children's performances when she herself was relaxing on the lake. The money went to the maintenance of a sanatorium for teachers of the Yenisei Society.

The sanatorium for teachers on Lake Shira arose on the initiative of V. T. Zimin, who donated 600 rubles for the construction. By July 6, 1903, the building was ready, and on July 19 the sanatorium was opened. It was designed for 30 people. In 1903, 12 teachers were treated and rested.

Water from Lake Shira was used only as a medicine. For ordinary drinking, cooking, samovars, it was completely unsuitable, since it tastes bitter-salty and leaves a white precipitate during evaporation. Water for drinking and washing was delivered from wells, which were located 1.5 versts from the lake, by the Tatars Torinovs on horseback in barrels, 70 kopecks - 1 ruble per person per season. Fresh water was also brought from Lake Itkul. In the early 1900s, a fresh water pipeline from this lake was built.

Every year, several experienced koumiss Tatars came to the resorts of Lake Shira, who settled two versts from the resort (near wells) and annually delivered koumis to visitors at 20 kopecks per bottle. Climatic conditions on Lake Shira were favorable for koumis treatment. Koumis is a drink made from mare's milk and is a product of alcoholic and lactic acid fermentation. The use of koumis for medicinal purposes in Siberia began in the 1870s. Treatment was carried out under the supervision of a doctor.

Visitors to the lake who did not use their own table received lunch, dinner and boiling water in samovars from the kitchens. During the season, more than 10 of them were opened. In the morning and in the evening, cookies and milk were given to the samovar, at noon - meat pies, curd cheesecakes or pancakes. At will, it was possible to get dishes prepared both in oil and in water. The kitchens were located in the center of the resort village. Their settings were no different from the settings of the kitchens of individual households, made of wooden huts with small windows. The main entrepreneurs on the lake were Lavrova, Galin, Volzhinsky, Arnautova, Yakovleva, who kept kitchens. Lunch, breakfast and bread were sold from the kitchen for 18-25 rubles a month.

Visitors to Lake Shira used the services of a laundress who lived on the lake during the seasons. The laundry fee ranged from 5 to 10 kopecks apiece. Washerwomen lived in difficult conditions, huddling in booths where clothes were washed and dried.

Along with the village more or less comfortable on Lake Shira, two more independent villages were formed near it: "Working Slobodka", in which there were about 50 buildings - booths, and the Ivanitsky ulus, numbering about 25 yurts (data for 1903). The predominant type of buildings on Lake Shira were yurts and booths, in which workers and small merchants lived. Usually, such buildings were small in size for 2-3 people. The role of the booth was reduced mainly to the fact that they slept and hid in it in inclement weather. There were no floors and windows in this kind of buildings. The booths were rented from the owners: the average cost of a booth was 10 rubles. The inhabitants of booths, workers, did not use the table from the common kitchen, but cooked their own food on small stoves - chuvals arranged nearby. Instead, pod- a stone slab- was laid, which was also furnished with slabs from the sides and back in such a way that several holes were formed - the rear one for the exit of smoke. This hole was lined with small plates to obtain a small pipe. In other holes, food was cooked in special vessels. Ordinary clay was used to fasten the plates. Such a furnace was usually located under the open air. Occasionally, sheds were made of bark or birch bark. The furnace was not durable, as it was washed away by rain and easily collapsed.

In 1909, Surikov and his daughter Elena spent the whole of July at the Shira resort. The artist's granddaughter Natalia Konchalovskaïa writes:

The Surikovs did not communicate with the resort public, there was no reason for them to be treated. Vasily Ivanovich was interested only in the Khakass. He invited them to his place, Lena treated them to tea. Surikov went to them himself in the uluses, painted them from life. He liked the way they sat right on the grass in groups talking, the women separated from the men. I liked the way they sang - what they see in front of them, they sing about it mournfully, monotonously. They danced not gracefully, but horse games and horse races were incomparable.

— N.P. Konchalovskaya

In 1927, on the initiative of V. S. Pirussky, the first Siberian sanatorium pioneer camp was opened, even earlier, in 1925, he opened a department of motion therapy (healing movement).

Konstantin Nikolaevich Zavadovsky, professor of the Departments of Neurology and Psychiatry (1920-1928), Propaedeutic Clinic of Internal Diseases (1938-1950), Physiotherapy and Balneology (1928-1938) of the medical faculty of Tomsk State University and the medical faculty of Tomsk Medical Institute, took an active part in the organization of the Shira resort. In the 1920s, together with professors I.A. Valedinsky, M.G. Kurlov, P.P. Orlov, he participated in research expeditions to study the Shira resort; in 1936–1941 he carried out the scientific management of the Shira resort.

Academician Yablokov Dmitry Dmitrievich was a consultant and scientific director of the Shira resort.

== Resort ==
Shira Lake Balneo Resort specialized in the treatment of patients with diseases of nervous system, musculoskeletal system, digestive system, respiratory organs, gynecological, skin diseases, ENT Shira Lake mineral water is similar to the Batalinsky mineral spring water of the Caucasus and contains a salt concentration of 17-20 g / liter. Also, silt mud of medium and low sulfide medium mineralized is used for treatment.

== Gallery ==
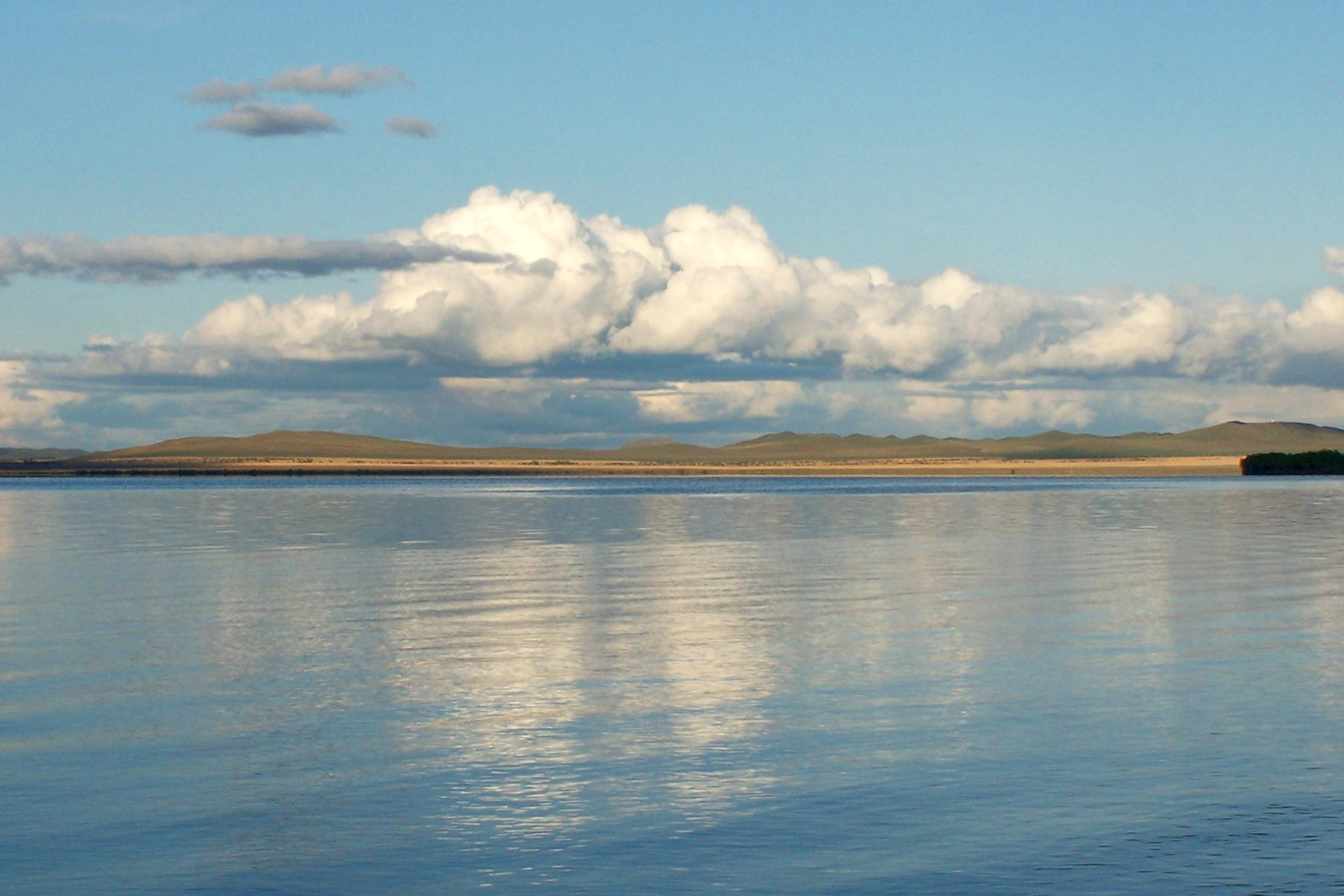
Lake Shira

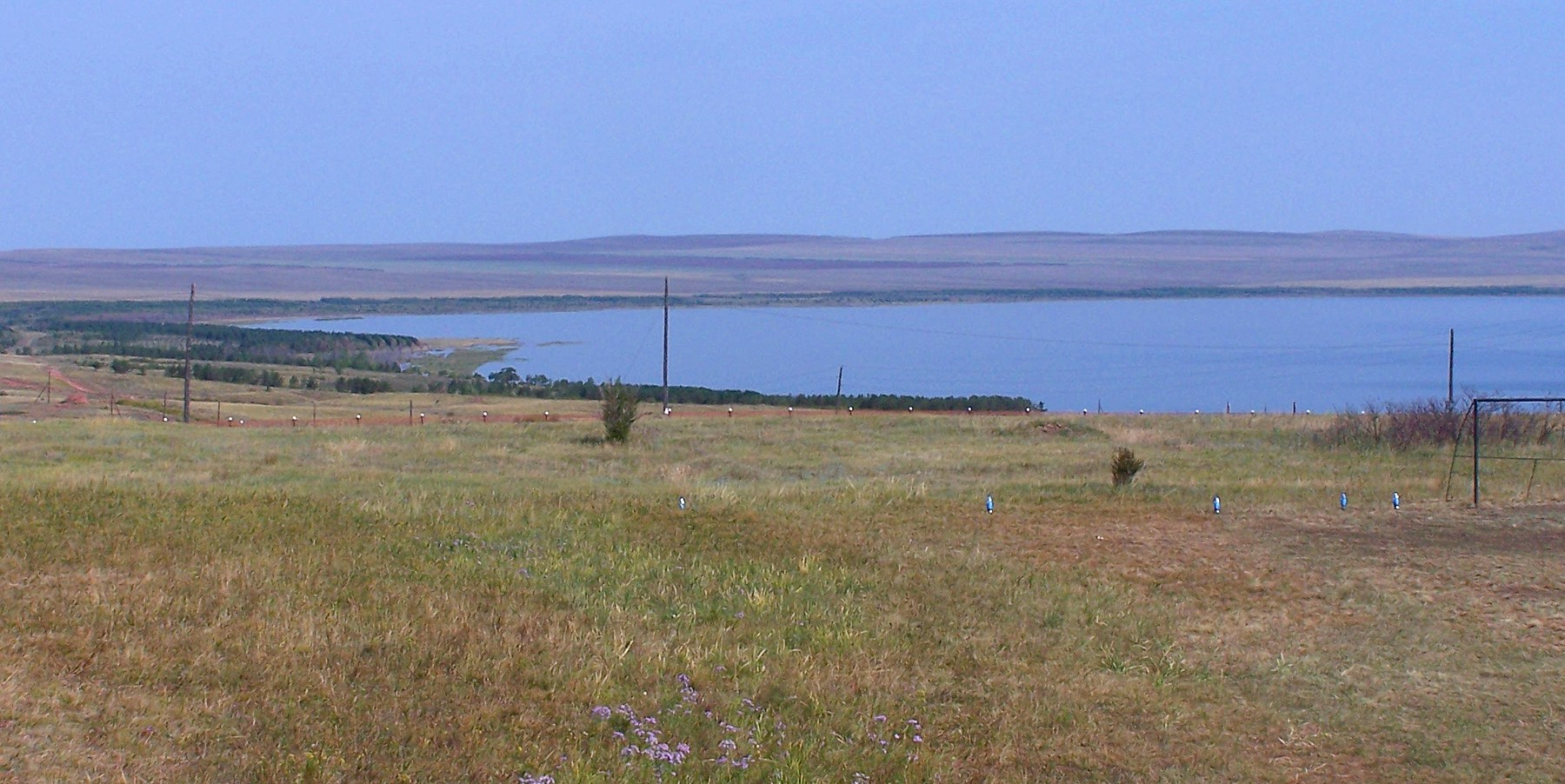
Western shore of lake Shira.

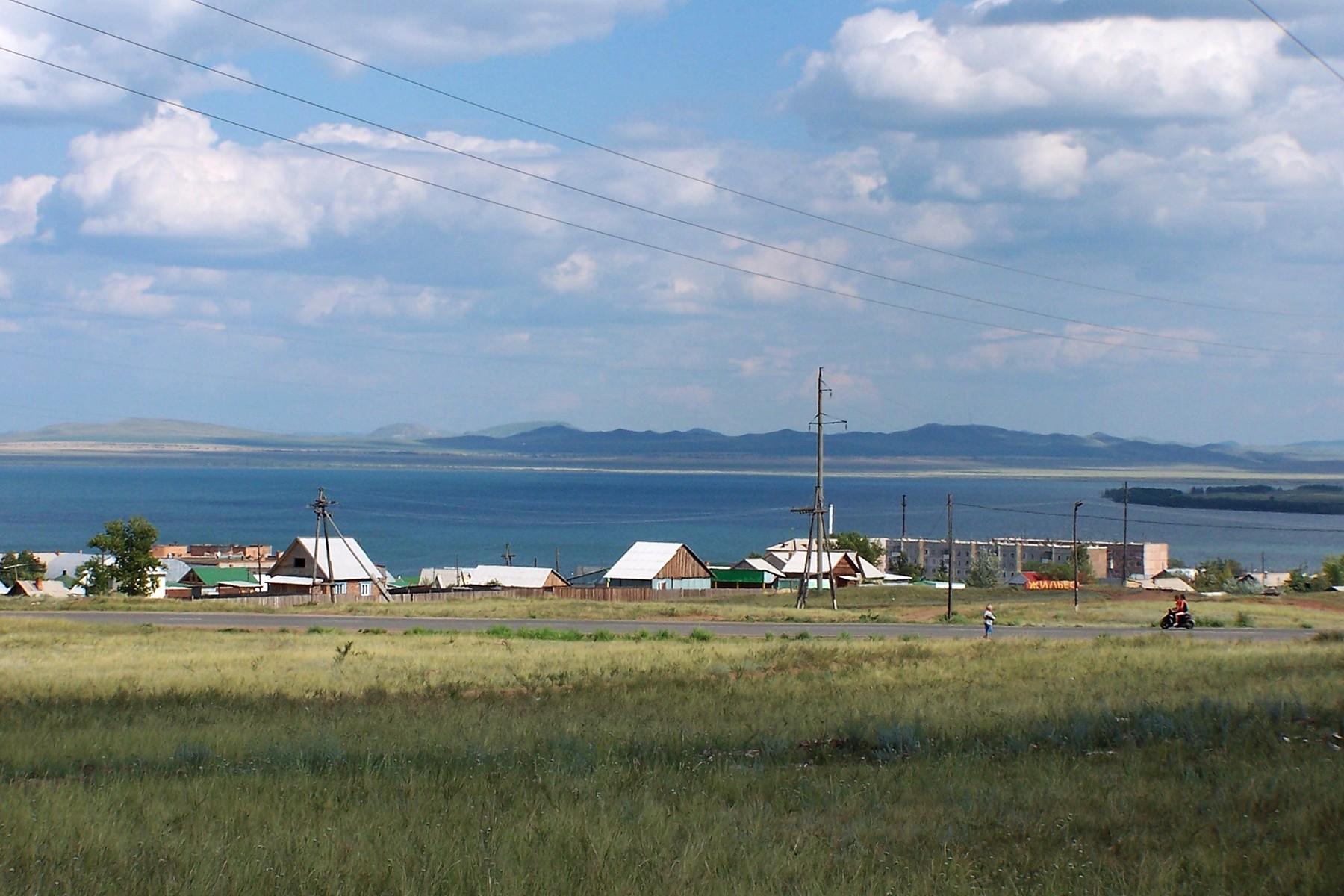
Lake Shira and a settlement on its lakeside.

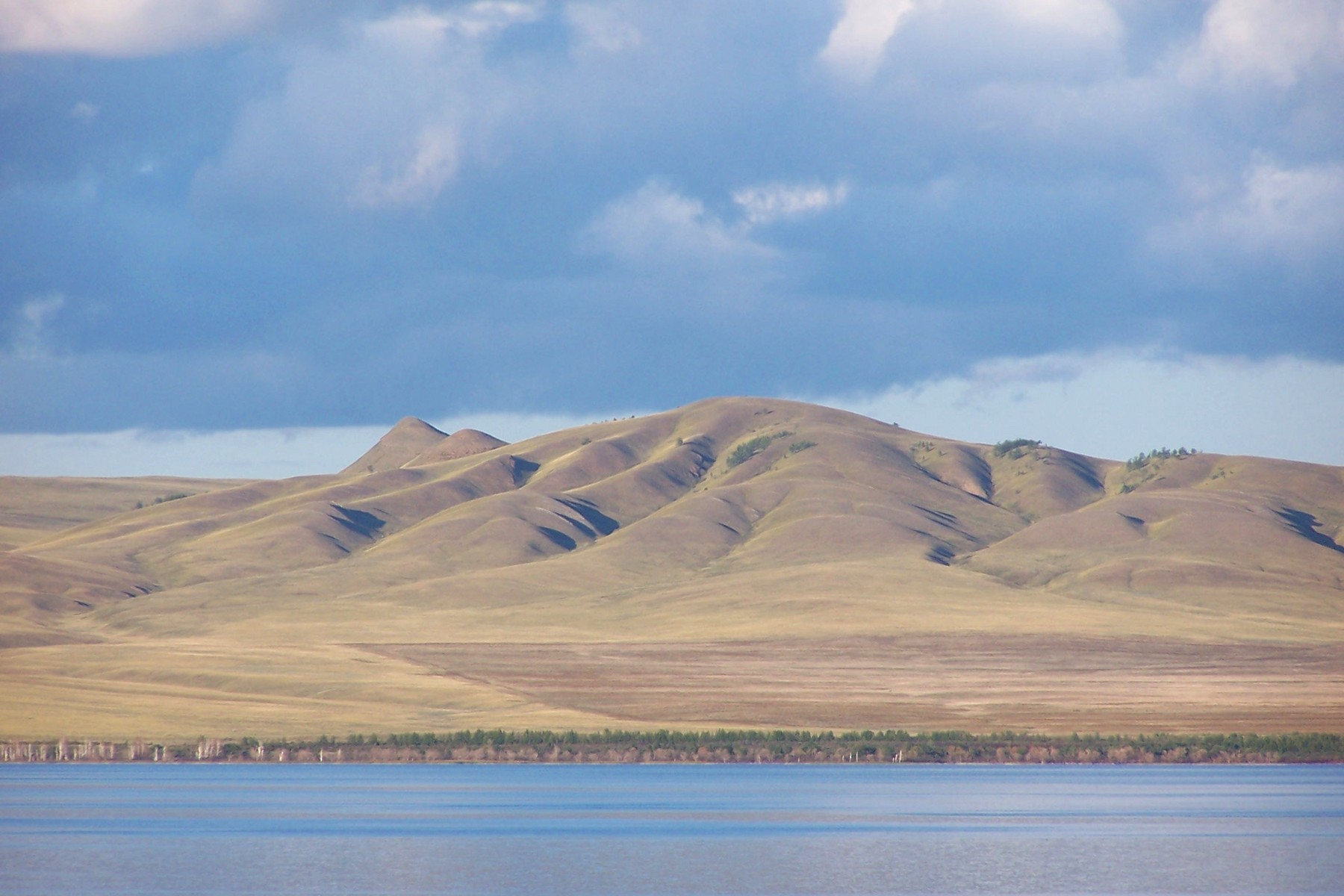
The eastern coast of the Lake Shira
