= Itkul =

Itkul may refer to

- Lake Itkul, Chelyabinsk Oblast
- Itkul (Chulym basin), lake in Chulymsky District, Novosibirsk Oblast
- Itkul culture, an early Saka culture
- Itkul Distillery, a distiller in Altai Krai
