= Lake Shunet =

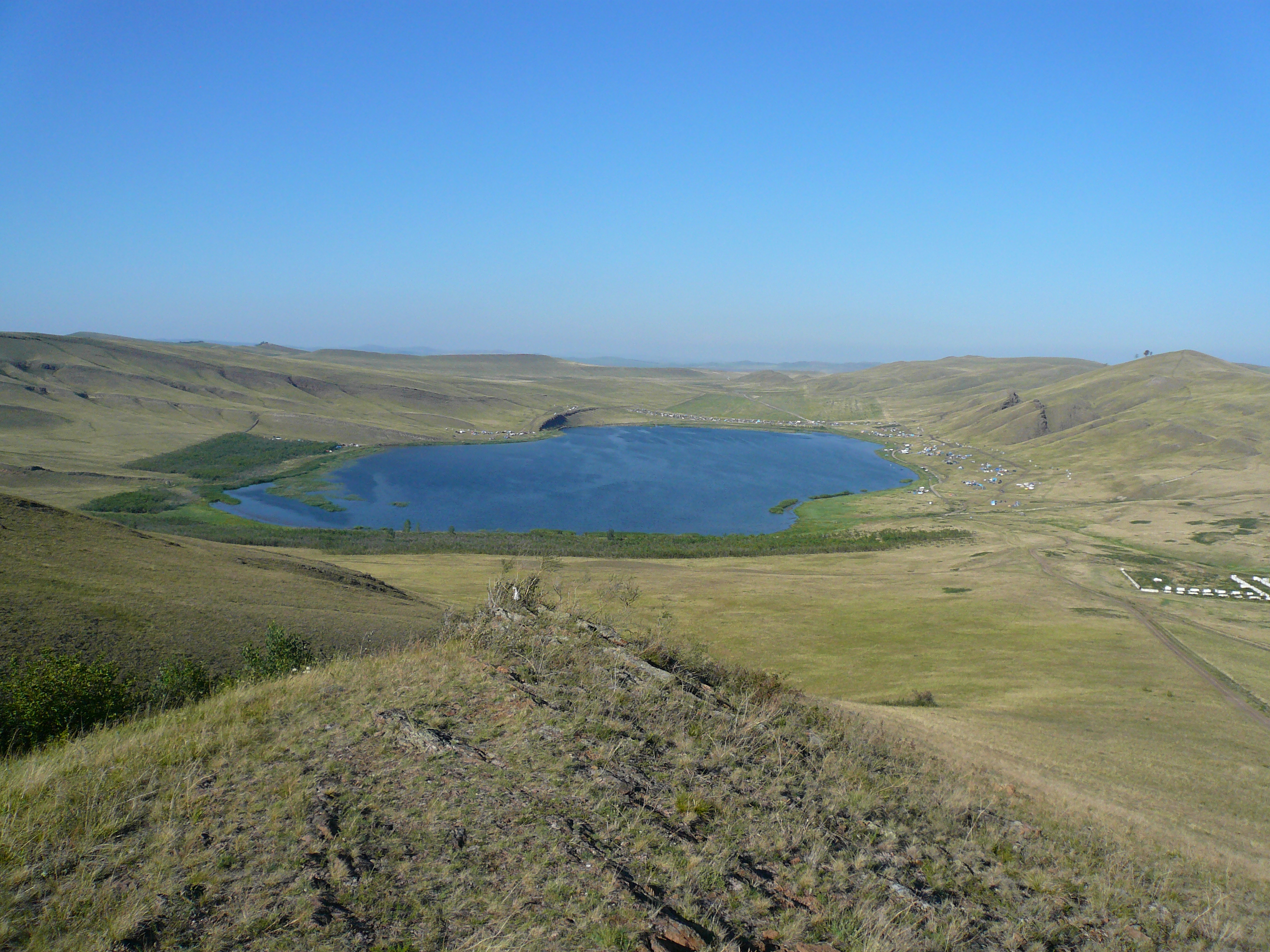
- Vision of the Lake Shunet.

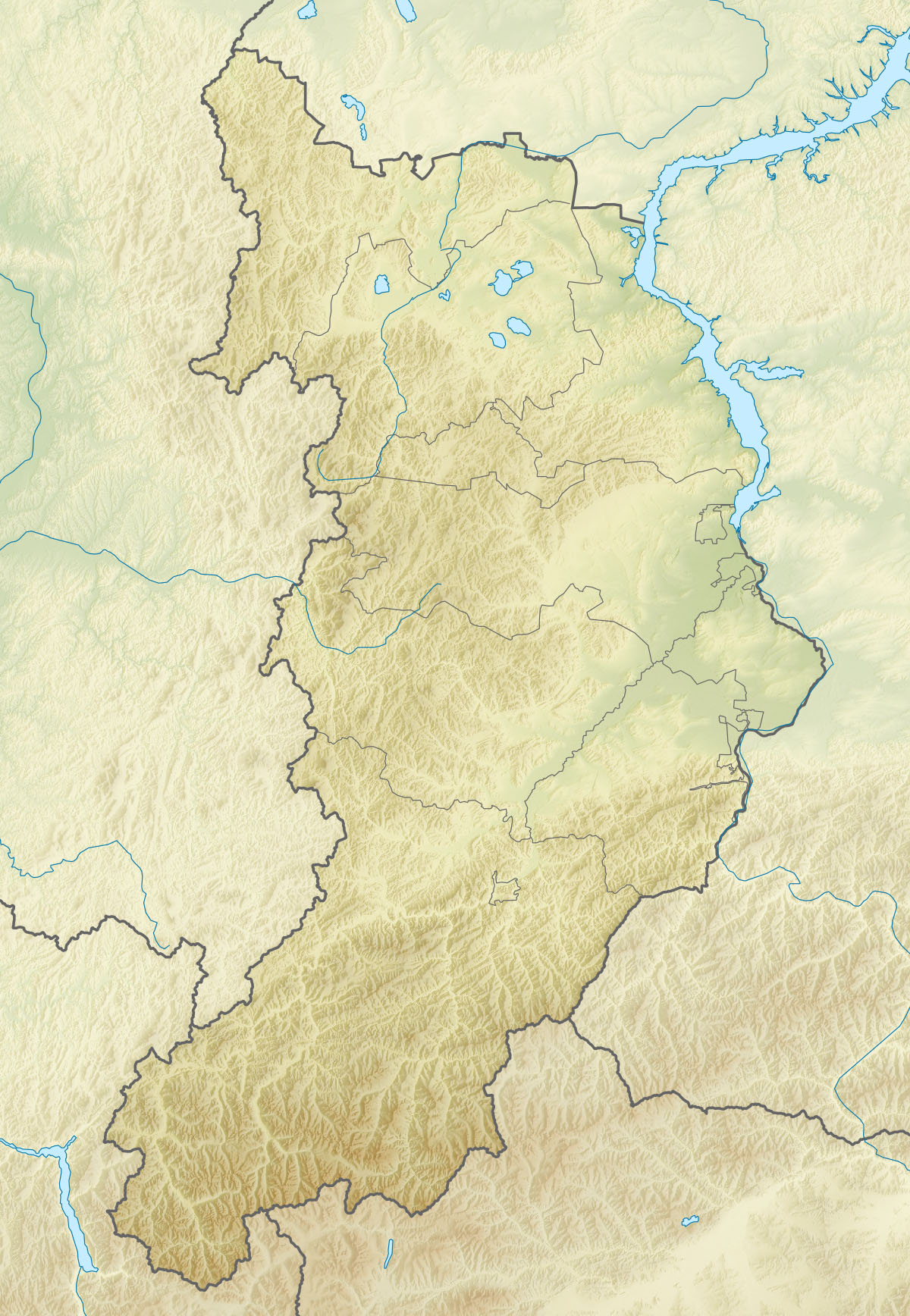
- Location within Khakassia
- Location: Shirinsky District, Republic of Khakassia, Russia
- Coordinates: 54°25′07″N 90°13′41″E
- Type: meromictic, saline lake
- Basin countries: Russia
- Surface area: 46 km (29 mi)
- Max. depth: 3 m (9.8 ft)
- Surface elevation: 319 m (1,047 ft)

Lake Shunet is a meromictic lake near the selo of Shira in the Republic of Khakassia, Russia. It belongs to the Shirin group of lakes. It is located 7 km south of the Lake Shira, in a deep basin, at around 390 m above sea level.

The mineralization of the lake is of about 15 grams. There is sulfate-chloride and sodium-magnesium in its composition, very similar to the Shirin moisture. The composition of both only differs in the percentage of anions and cations.

In the early stages of development, the lake was considered as a source of salt. There is mineral water and peloid present. The peloid was found at the end of the 19th century. In the 20th century, the peloid was largely expended by the visitors, what has caused that at present the thickness of the peloid layer is of about a meter.

On the shores of the lake are growing saltworts. In winter, the lake does not freeze.
