= Khakassia Nature Reserve =

Nature reserve in Khakassia, Russia

Khakasski Nature Reserve
- Russian: Хакасский заповедник (Also: Khakassky)
- IUCN category Ia (strict nature reserve)
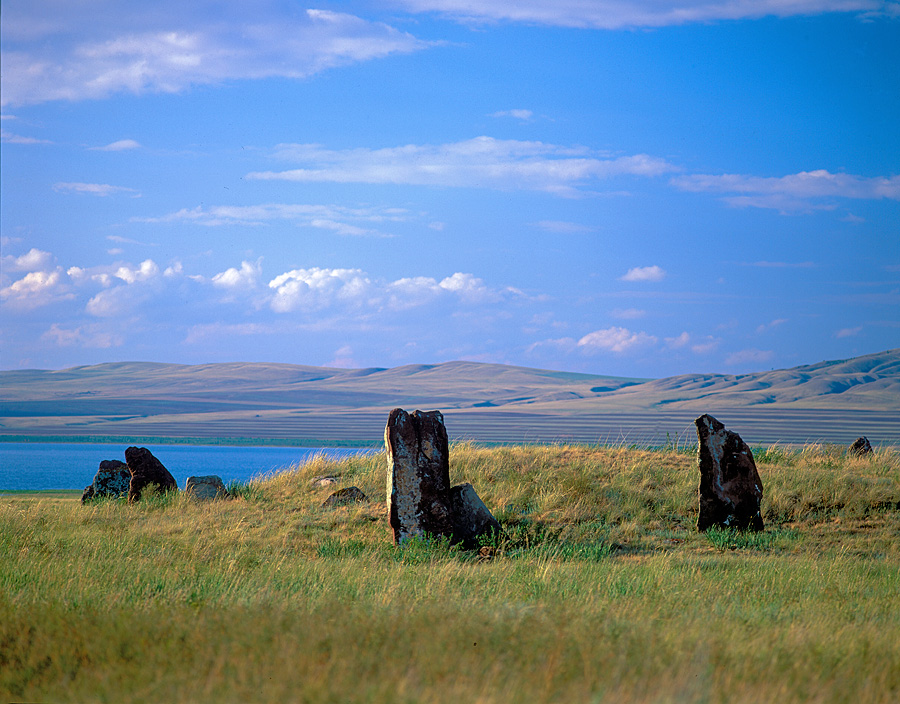
- Khakasski Zapovednik

- Location within Russia
- Location: Khakassia
- Nearest city: Abakan
- Coordinates: 52°6′0″N 89°17′0″E
- Area: 2,675.58 square kilometres (661,150 acres; 1,033 sq mi)
- Established: 1999
- Governing body: Ministry of Natural Resources and Environment (Russia)
- Website: http://zapovednik-khakassky.ru/en

Khakasski Nature Reserve (Russian: Хакасский заповедник) (also Khakassky) is a Russian 'zapovednik' (strict nature reserve) covering two large mountain areas (alpine and mountain-steppe), and a cluster of seven steppe sites located within the left bank of the Minusinsk depression. The reserve is situated in the Tashtypsky District of Khakassia. It was originally created to preserve steppe ecosystems, wetlands and waterfowl nesting sites, and a historical complex of monuments and cemeteries from the 4-11 centuries BC. The reserve is particularly noted for its variety of large lakes on the Yenisei River migration route for birds. The current configuration of protected sectors was established in 1999, and covers a total area of 2,675.58 km^{2} (1,033.05 sq mi).

== Topography ==
The Khakasski Reserve is a collection of nine tracts of land covering two types of habitat - steppe and mountain taiga. The Minusinsk Depression is a low plain between the Kuznetsk Alatau mountain range to the west, and the Sayan Mountains to the east. The Khakassia steppe, which is part of the Altai-Sayan mountain region, has characteristics of mountain steppes.

Steppe Group

- Lake Shira (ru:Белё) (1,397 hectares). A salt lake with a surface area of 39.5 km2, Lake Shira has a public access section that supports beaches and medicinal spas (the water has a very high magnesium content). The lake is covered with ice from late November to April.
- Lake Bele (ru:Белё) (5,285 hectares). The largest mineral lake in Eastern Siberia (52 km2), Bele is 8 km north of Lake Shira. The surrounding terrain rises up to 240 meters above the lake surface, and there is some fir and spruce on the generally hilly steppe landscape. Like Lake Shira, Bele has no outflow and only one small river for inflow. It has a salinity of 9-14 g/liter of water (about 1/3 the salinity of seawater). The reserve covers the north, southeast and southwest portions of the lake. Bele's waters contain an aboriginal population of Bele perch.

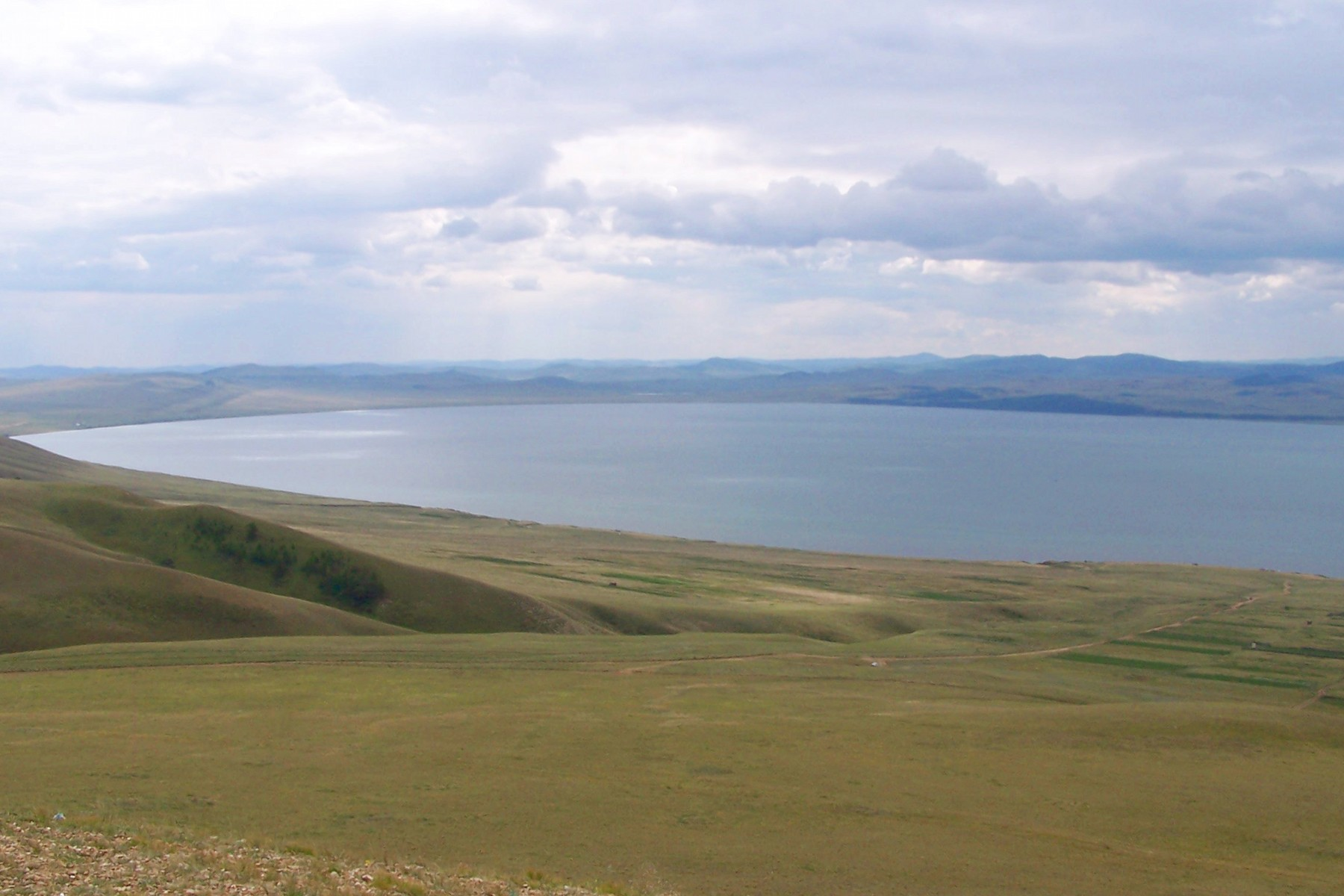
Lake Itkul

- Lake Itkul (ru:Иткуль (озеро, Хакасия)) (5,547 hectares). Located 3 km southwest of Lake Shira, but 100 meters higher. Itkul is a freshwater lake, unlike Shira or Bele which are alkaline. The shores are sandy, or small gravel. Surroundings are gentle hills, and the southern shore has some covering of larch forest.
- Oglakhty (ru:Оглахты) (2,590 hectares). Oglakhty is a lowland ridge with a pronounced cuesta (sloped) formation, having an uplift of 100–150 meters. The rock is mostly sedimentary of the lower Carboniferous; there are some stands of birch but overall the terrain is steppe. This sector includes a burial complex of the Tashtyk culture from the first century CE. Most of the 15 km ridge, which runs along the Krasnoyarsk Reservoir, is part of the Khakasski reserve.
- Kamyzyaksky steppe and Lake Ulug-Kol (ru:Камызякская степь) (4,789 hectares). Steppe ridge, with a small shallow lake that is endorheic with bitter-salty water. The lake has mud-flats on its shores and is a breeding place for a wide variety of waterfowl.
- Podzaploty (ru:Подзаплотные болота) (5,181 hectares). Steppe terrain.
- Hol-Bogaz (ru:Хол-Богаз) (2,499 hectares). Steppe and mountain-steppe region in a spur of the Kuznetsky Alatau range.

Mountain Taiga Group

- Maly Abakan (ru:Малый Абакан) (97,829 hectares). Along the "Small Abakan River", in mountainous terrain south of the steppe sectors of the Khakassi reserve. This sector was originally formed as a separate reserve in 1993 to protect pristine mountain pine taiga to serve as a benchmark for the study of the effects of logging. It was also designated as a site for the resettlement of sable.
- Zaimka Lykovykh (ru:) (142,441 hectares). Contains the preserved homestead of Lykov family of Old Believers, who lived in the remote area far from civilization until well into the 20th century.

== Climate and ecoregion ==
Khakasski is located in the Sayan montane conifer forests ecoregion, a region of mid-elevation mountains in the Altai-Sayan mountain range of central Asia. It lies between the Siberian taiga to the north and the Mongolian steppe to the south. This ecoregion is characterized by mountains desiccated with river valleys, high levels of precipitation, and high biodiversity. Flora is generally dependent on the elevation and terrain, with forests having three main subzones based on altitude: light needle-leaf sparse taiga, dark needle-leaf taiga, and dark taiga.

The climate of Khakasski is Subarctic climate, without dry season (Köppen climate classification Subarctic climate (Dfc)). This climate is characterized by mild summers (only 1–3 months above 10 °C (50.0 °F)) and cold, snowy winters (coldest month below −3 °C (26.6 °F)). In the steppe areas of the Khakassi reserve, average temperatures range from −18 °C (0 °F) in January, to 20 °C (68 °F) in July. Average precipitation per year is 250 – 350 mm, although this can range up to 500 mm in the forested areas. Average frost-free period per year is 110–120 days. In the mountainous sectors of Khakassi, temperatures about 2 C degrees cooler, and precipitation ranges up to 800 - 1,100 mm/year with a frost-free period of only 85 days.

== Flora and fauna ==
The different sectors were each chosen for a particular habitat for study and conservation, with the two general environments being steppe and mountain taiga. In the steppe area, the typical landscape features shores of developed upland meadows, with small larch groves and birch, and thickets of steppe shrubs. Where rivers enter the lakes are narrow strips of reed swamps, saline steppes and meadows. The reserve has recorded more than 852 species of vascular plants in the steppe areas. The mountain taiga sectors to the south are about 80 covered with coniferous forests, with smaller communities of dark-coniferous-birch forest. All told, the various sectors of the reserve have recorded 1195 species of vascular plants, from 429 genera and 105 families.

The animal life of the reserve is characteristic of the northern Sayan mountain steppe and forest region. Characteristics mammals of the steppe are the steppe lemming, vole, and common field mouse. Larger mammals are the hare, fox and deer. Scientists on the reserve have recorded 52 species of mammals and 295 species of birds. 32 species of fish are resident, with chum salmon and trout recently having been reintroduced to Lake Bele.

== Ecoeducation and access ==
As a strict nature reserve, the Khakasski Reserve is mostly closed to the general public, although scientists and those with 'environmental education' purposes can make arrangements with park management for visits. There are several 'ecotourist' routes in the reserve, however, that are open to the public. These require permits to be obtained in advance. On the Lake Itkul sector there is an 18 km bike trail, and a 14 km bird-watching trail with observation platforms. The reserve sponsors a Nature Museum that is open to the public. The main office is in the city of Abakan.

== See also ==
- List of Russian Nature Reserves (class 1a 'zapovedniks')
- National Parks of Russia
- Kyzlasov Peak
