= Tashtyp =

Rural locality in Khakassia, Russia

Coordinates: 52°47′59″N 89°53′32″E

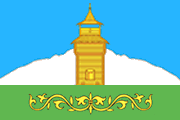
Flag of Tashtyp

Tashtyp (Russian: Таштып; Khakas: Тастып, Tastıp) is a rural locality (a selo) and the administrative center of Tashtypsky District of the Republic of Khakassia, Russia. Population: 6,423 (2010 census); 6,473 (2002 census); 7,536 (1989 Soviet census).
