= Kyzlasov Peak =

Mountain in Khakassia, Russia

- Пик Кызласова
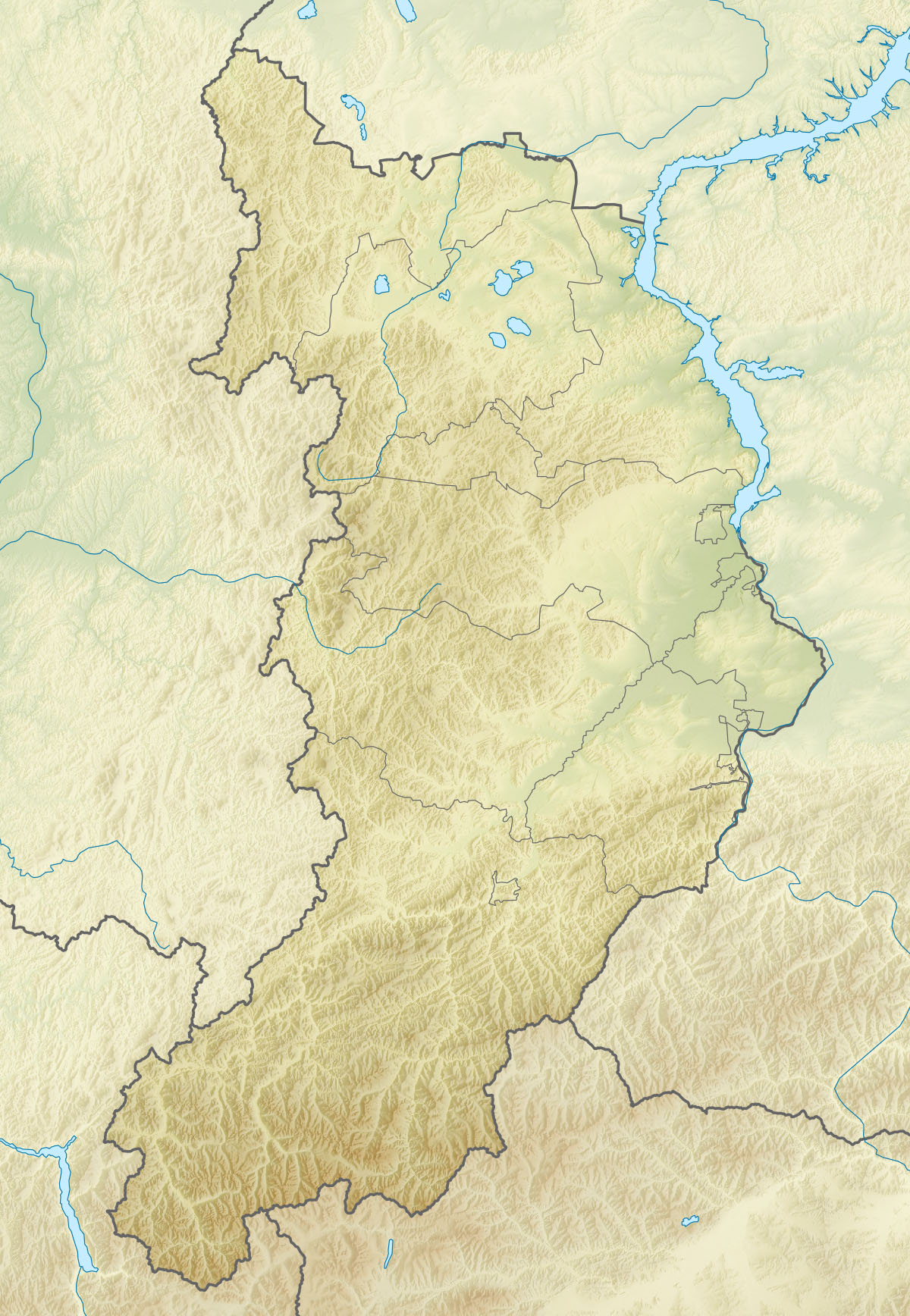
- Location within Khakassia Location within Russia

Highest point
- Elevation: 2,969 m (9,741 ft)
- Coordinates: 51°39′06″N 89°12′05″E

Geography
- Location: Khakassia, Russia
- Parent range: Western Sayan; South Siberian Mountains

Climbing
- First ascent: 30 July 2018

Kyzlasov Peak (Russian: Пик Кызласова Khakas: Кызласовтың тағы, Kızlasovtıñ tağı) is a peak in Khakassia, Russia. It is the highest point of the federal subject.

This mountain was a formerly unnamed peak that was officially named in honor of Khakas historian and archaeologist Leonid Kyzlasov in 2016.

== Description ==
Kyzlasov Peak is a 2,969 metres (9,741 ft) high mountain located in the Western Sayan, South Siberian System. It rises at the southern limit of Khakassia, in the Tashtypsky District, near the border of Tuva.

Formerly 2,930 metres (9,610 ft) high Mount Karatosh (Khakas: Хара тос, Karatosh, meaning "black ice") was deemed to be the highest point of the Khakass Republic.

== See also ==
- List of highest points of Russian federal subjects
- List of mountains and hills of Russia
- Khakassia Nature Reserve
