= Verkhny Ufaley =

Verkhny Ufaley Верхний Уфалей
- Town
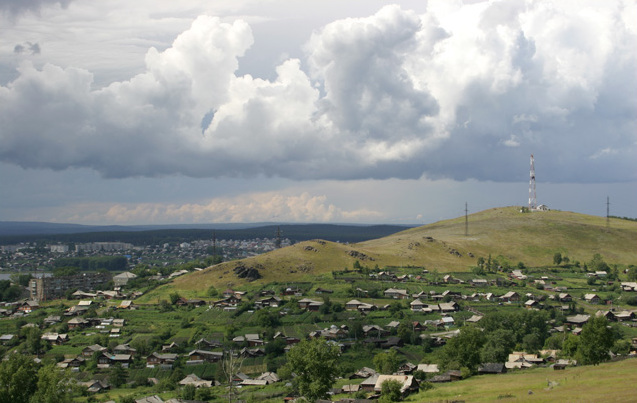
- View of Verkhny Ufaley

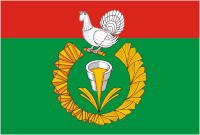
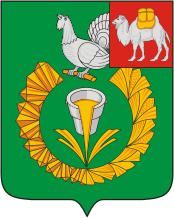
- Flag Coat of arms
- Interactive map of Verkhny Ufaley
- Location of Verkhny Ufaley Verkhny Ufaley (Chelyabinsk Oblast)
- Coordinates: 56°04′N 60°14′E
- Country: Russia
- Federal subject: Chelyabinsk Oblast
- Founded: 1761
- Town status since: 1940

Population (2010 Census)
  - Total: 30,481
  - Estimate (2023): 22,548 (−26%)

Administrative status
  - Subordinated to: Town of Verkhny Ufaley
  - Capital of: Town of Verkhny Ufaley

Municipal status
  - Urban okrug: Verkhneufaleysky Urban Okrug
  - Capital of: Verkhneufaleysky Urban Okrug
- Time zone: UTC+5 (MSK+2)
- Postal codes: 456800–456805, 456818, 456819
- OKTMO ID: 75706000001
- Website: ufaleyadmin.ru

Verkhny Ufaley (Russian: Ве́рхний Уфале́й) is a town in Chelyabinsk Oblast, Russia, located on the Ufaley River (a tributary of the Ufa River), 142 kilometers (88 mi) northwest of Chelyabinsk, the administrative center of the oblast. Population: 30,481 (2010 census); 34,360 (2002 census); 40,061 (1989 Soviet census).

== History ==
One of the oldest populated places in the Ural region, it was founded in 1761 and was granted town status on 26 April 1940.

== Administrative and municipal status ==
Within the framework of administrative divisions, it is, together with fourteen rural localities, incorporated as the Town of Verkhny Ufaley—an administrative unit with the status equal to that of the districts. As a municipal division, the Town of Verkhny Ufaley is incorporated as Verkhneufaleysky Urban Okrug.

== Economy ==
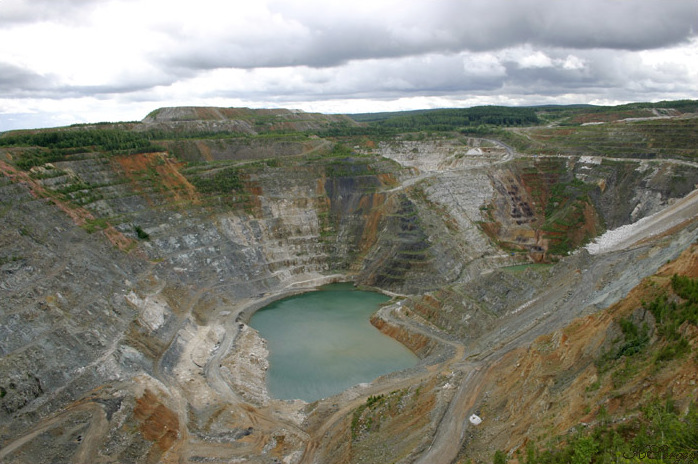
A coal mine in Verkhny Ufaley

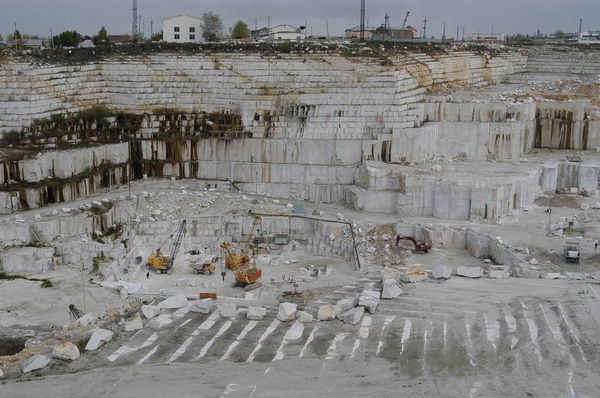
Marble canyon in Verkhny Ufaley

Verkhny Ufaley is rich in mineral deposits (nickel and iron ores, marble, fire clay) and the economy of the town and the surrounding areas is heavily dependent on metallurgical factories, such as "UZMM" (Ufaley Metallurgical Machinery Works) and "Ufaleynickel". The latter, in particular, is the town's largest industrial enterprise, responsible for 75% of the total volume of the goods produced and much of the town's employment.

== Lake Itkul ==
Lake Itkul, located at the altitude of 720 meters (2,360 ft) above sea level, is one of the notable natural wonders in Verkhny Ufaley. It is fed by springs, creeks, and small rivers, so its waters renew within a year and are fresh and clean. The lake is clear but has a brownish reflection. The lake and its vicinity have become a popular destination for Verkhny Ufaley's residents and visitors alike.

== Sports ==
The bandy club Nikelshchik plays in the second highest division, Russian Bandy Supreme League. Their spectator numbers stand out. Whereas it's unusual in their division to reach 1 000, they usually have a couple of thousand.
