= Sergey Elpatyevsky =

Russian author and medical doctor

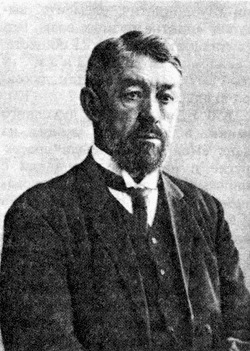
- Born: November 3, 1854; Vladimir Governorate, Russian Empire
- Died: January 9, 1933 (aged 78); Moscow, Soviet Union

Sergey Yakovlevich Elpatyevsky (Russian: Серге́й Я́ковлевич Елпа́тьевский), November 3, 1854 – January 9, 1933, was a Russian Empire and Soviet writer and medical doctor.

== Early life ==
Elpatyevsky was born in the village of Novoselki-Kudrino, Vladimir Governorate, into the family of a village priest. He studied at a religious school and, after graduating in 1868, at a seminary. In 1872 he entered the Law Faculty of Moscow State University, later transferring to the Medical Faculty.

== Career ==
In the 1870s Elpatyevsky participated in the narodnik movement. In 1875, he assisted in the organization of settlements under the populists. He also provided his Moscow apartment for populist meetings. In 1876/77 he helped to organize a student club along with S.V. Martynov and V.S. Lebedev. The club served to coordinate student activities and organize assistance for political exiles in Siberia.

In 1877 Elpatyevsky was investigated on charges of having links with revolutionary groups, but released for lack of evidence. In 1878 he finished his studies at the University, and began working as a doctor in Skopinsky County, Ryazan province. He also continued his revolutionary activities. In 1880 he was arrested on charges of promoting The People's Will, and deported to Ufa province under police supervision.

== Exile ==
In 1884 Elpatyevsky was arrested for distributing illegal literature, and sentenced to exile in Eastern Siberia. He arrived in Krasnoyarsk on October 24, 1884, where he met with the writer Vladimir Korolenko. Elpatyevsky settled in the village of Verhnepashennom, in the Yeniseysky District of Yenisei province. His wife Lyudmila and their two children went with him voluntarily. His wife and children settled in the city of Yeniseysk.

In 1885 Elpatyevsky was allowed to resettle in Yeniseysk with his family. He repeatedly appealed to the governor of the Yenisei province to allow him to practice medicine, but was refused. He then began to practice medicine free of charge. Later he was granted the right to move freely throughout the countryside to fight the epidemics of diphtheria and scarlet fever in Angara and measles in Turukhansk. He received the thanks of Governor I. K. Pedashenko for helping to fight these epidemics.

In April, 1886 a Chelyabinsk merchant named Balakshin asked Governor Pedashenko if Elpatyevsky could be allowed to accompany him to Lake Shira. The governor allowed Elpatyevsky to visit the Minusinsky District for scientific purposes. Their scientific observations about the healing properties of the water of Lake Shira were outlined in Elpatyevsky's report at a meeting of the Yenisei Province Society of Physicians.

== Later life ==
After his period of exile, Elpatyevsky lived in Nizhny Novgorod, and published works in the magazines Russian Wealth and Russian Gazette. In 1893 he took part in the national fight against hunger and cholera . In the late 1890s he settled in Yalta, where he often met with Leo Tolstoy and Anton Chekhov, whom he treated for tuberculosis. In the early 1900s he went abroad, and met with the founders of the Socialist-Revolutionary Party. During the 1905 Russian Revolution he held meetings of members of the party in his apartment. He didn't share some of their ideas and, for this reason, became one of the creators of the Labour Popular Socialist Party. Vladimir Lenin criticized him for this.

He was arrested for publishing the booklet Land and Freedom in 1910. In 1910/11 he was imprisoned in the Peter and Paul Fortress.

During World War 1 Elpatyevsky worked in hospitals in the All-Russian Land Union. In 1917 he left the Labour Popular Socialist Party. After the Russian Revolution of 1917 he lived in Moscow. From 1922 to 1928 he worked as a doctor in the Kremlin hospital. He died in 1933 in Moscow.

== Notes ==
=== English translations ===
- Pity Me!, from The Russian Review, Vol 2, The Russian Review Publishing Company, NY, 1916.
- The Homeless Ones, from The Shield, Knopf, NY, 1917.
