= Shira railway station =

Railway station in Russia

Shira station Шира станция
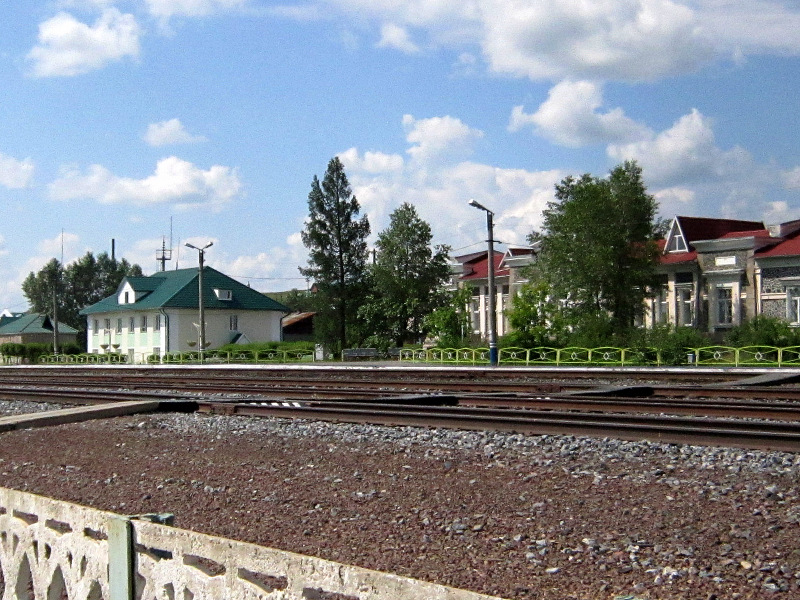

General information
- Location: Shira village Khakassia; Russia
- Coordinates: 54°29′18″N 89°57′38″E
- System: Krasnoyarsk Railway
- Operator: Krasnoyarsk Railway Abakan railway region
- Line: Achinsk I - Tigey
- Distance: 260 кm Achinsk I
- Platforms: 1
- Tracks: 5

Construction
- Structure type: Platform type lateral, Platform shape straight

Other information
- Station code: ESR station code: 885504; Экспресс-3 code: 2038173
- Classification: Cargo-passenger

History
- Opened: 1916
- Original company: Achinsk - Minusinsk railway

Key dates
- 15 December 1924: The first train arrived at the station
Location

Shira is a railway station of the Abakan region of the Krasnoyarsk Railway on the line crossing between Achinsk Krasnoyarsk Krai (Achinsk I railway station on the main course of the Trans–Siberian Railway) and Tigey Khakassia ( Tigey railway station railway junction with the South Siberian Railway).

It is located in the village of Shira, the administrative center of the Shirinsky district of the Republic of Khakassia.

== History ==
Shira railway station was founded in 1916 on the Achinsk - Minusinsk railway line, part of the Siberian Railway.

The settlement at Shira was established that year during the construction of the railway line, and in 1917 consisted of 57 people.

The first train arrived at the station on 15 December 1924. There is a one-story station building.

By 1926 the line had been completed as far as Abakan station, traversing 460 km (290 mi). The station became part of the Krasnoyarsk Railway in 1936, which lasted until the railway's abolition in 1961 and its merger into the East Siberian Railway. In 1979 a new Krasnoyarsk Railway was formed from the East Siberian Railway, and in 2003 the railway and Shira station became part of Russian Railways.

The station is served by long-distance trains between Moscow and Abakan, though not by commuter services. Trains stop for 10 minutes at the station.

== Long distance station ==
No. Train	Rail route	No. Train	Rail route
64	Abakan - Moscow	68	Moscow - Abakan
