= Itkul Distillery =

Russian distiller

- Native name: Иткульский спиртзавод
- Romanized name: Itkulski spirtzavod
- Formerly: Russian: Иткульский винокуренный завод
- Type: Open joint-stock company
- Industry: Alcohol industry
- Founded: December 15, 1868; 157 years ago in Sokolovo, Russian Empire
- Founders: Konstantin Platonov, Grigory Badyin
- Headquarters: Sokolovo, Zonalny District, Altai Krai, Russia
- Key people: Yuri Tint (general manager)
- Products: Ethanol, vodka, and other liquors
- Number of employees: 315 (2021)
- Parent: Marussia Beverages
- Website: www.itkul.ru

Iktul Distillery is a Russian distiller based in Sokolovo, Zonalny District, Altai Krai. Founded in 1868, it is the oldest distillery in Eastern Siberia.

== History ==
=== Imperial Period ===
The Itkul Distillery was founded in the village of Sokolovo by Konstantin Pavlovich Platonov (Russian: Константин Павлович Платонов), a hereditary nobleman and former official of the Altai Mountain Region administration, and a Barnaul merchant by the name of Grigory Terentyevich Badyin (Russian: Григорий Терентьевич Бадьин). The distillery derives its name from the Itkul river, which flows through the village of Sokolovo. In 1867 Platonov and Badyin became the first entrepreneurs to receive permission to build a distillery in Altai Mountain Region, and on December 15, 1868, Itkul Distillery started operations. Vasily Andreevich Gusarov (Russian: Василий Андреевич Гусаров) from Saint Petersburg became the manager of the distillery and held the position until 1910.

Local authorities initially set the production quota for the Itkul Distillery at 50,000 buckets (a Russian measure of capacity, roughly equal to 12,3 liters) of polugar (a Russian standard for a 38% ABV spirit) per annum (p.a.) However, the actual production volume would soon exceed this quota, reaching 100,000 buckets p.a. by the mid-1870s and exceeding 200,000 p.a by the end of the century. The distillery was modernized several times and became one of the first electrified industrial sites in the Altai Mountain Region. In 1873, Platonov and Maria Aydarova (Russian: Мария Айдарова), the wife of an Altai Mountain Region administration official, established a glass factory in Sokolovo to produce bottles and glassware for the distillery and for sale.

The Itkul Distillery remained the only distillery in Altai Mountain Region until the late 1890s, thus ensuring considerable profits for its operations. Over this time, the enterprise grew to include a liquor factory in Barnaul (established 1882) and 46 liquor houses to distribute strong drinks. The annual revenue of the Iktul Distillery in 1882 amounted to 180,200 imperial rubles, accounting at the time for 42% of the turnover in goods produced in the Altai Mountain Region. At the All-Russia Industrial and Art Exhibition 1896 in Nizhny Novgorod, the distillery was awarded a bronze medal for its development of the liquor industry in the remote areas of the Russian Empire. By the beginning of the 20th century, the Iktul distillery had become the largest distillery in the Altai region and the second-largest in Siberia with a production volume of 219,000 buckets of polugar p.a.

With the introduction of a state wine monopoly in Siberia in 1902, the profitability of the distilling industry greatly decreased. The liquor factory in Barnaul closed, and the glass factory would never be rebuilt after it was destroyed by fire. In 1912, the alcohol business, by that time solely owned by Konstantin Platonov's only son Ivan (Russian: Иван Константинович Платонов) went bankrupt with a total debt of 1 million rubles. Platonov retained the ownership of the Itkul Distillery and later granted it to his stepdaughter Nadezhda Nikolaevna Oljunina (Russian: Надежда Николаевна Олюнина). But in August 1914, a prohibition on the sale of alcohol accompanied the entry of the Russian Empire into the First World War, forcing the distillery to cease production. As a result, the distillery remained effectively non-operational during the years of the Russian Revolution and the Russian Civil War.

=== Soviet Union ===
In 1925, the XIV Congress of the CPSU (B.) lifted restrictions on the alcohol industry and production on Itkul Distillery in 1925 under the management of the Rabfak graduate Ivan Illarionovich Gostev (Russian: Иван Илларионович Гостев). During the 1930s, nearby sovkhozes and kolkhozes were attached to the distillery, and a spur line was established, connecting it to the Trans-Siberian Railroad in order to ensure a stable supply of grain for its operations. In addition to grain spirit production, the Itkul Distillery also produced various liquors in the period from the 1920s to the 1940s. During the Second World War, the distillery produced over 1 million decaliters (dal) of grain spirit and roughly the same quantity of low-alcohol drinks for the Red Army. For this service, 113 distillery employees would subsequently be awarded the Medal For Valorous Work In The Great Patriotic War.

In the post-war years, the distillery was headed by Nikolai Ivanovich Klementsov (Russian: Николай Иванович Клименцов) who established greater cooperation with food industry colleges and institutes and invited young professionals from other parts of the USSR to work at Itkul Distillery. This in concert with a continuous process of modernization helped the production volume of the distillery to rise to 560,000 dal of raw spirit p.a., 215,000 dal of rectified alcohol p.a., and 332,000 dal of highly purified alcohol p.a. by the 1960s. In 1974, a carbon dioxide production facility was constructed at the distillery to provide for the needs of local industry. This expansion effectively saved the Itkul Distillery a decade later during the years of Gorbachev's anti-alcohol campaign, as the facility could only produce CO_{2} as a byproduct of the process of distillation. Nevertheless, the authorities dramatically lowered the production plan for the distillery, and most workers would be furloughed or placed on unpaid leave as a result of the anti-alcohol campaign.

=== Russian Federation ===
Following the collapse of the USSR, the Itkul Distillery was transformed into a public company on May 21, 1993. The first meeting of shareholders took place on March 11, 1994, where Viktor Mikhailovich Surkov (Russian: Виктор Михайлович Сурков) was elected as the general manager. In 1994, the distillery resumed vodka production, launching brands with unique recipes under the labels Itkulskaya, Sokolovskaya, and Sibiryachka, etc. Since 1996, the distillery has produced the Altai premium vodka brand for the French Pernod Ricard company. Altai vodka was exported to the European Union and received a medal at an international spirits exhibition in London in 2001. By 2008, the Iktul distillery had once again become the largest alcohol manufacturer in Altai Krai, accounting for 84% of spirit and 71% of vodka produced in the region bringing in annual revenue of over 870 million rubles.

In 2009, the state-owned Rosspirtprom beverage company transferred its 51% share in the Itkul Distillery to VTB Bank. The following year, the bank sold its stake to entrepreneur Vasily Anisimov (Russian: Василий Анисимов). Since 2009, the Itkul Distillery partnered with the international Marussia Beverages company to produce Mamont super premium vodka, which received the highest golden award at the 2020 International Wine & Spirit Competition as the best Russian vodka.

In 2015, the Kristall-Lefortovo holding acquired the Itkul Distillery from Anisimov. By 2016, the distillery was producing 1,887,000 dal of vodka and 1,030,000 dal of spirit p.a., making it one of the 15 largest vodka manufacturers and 20 largest spirit manufacturers in Russia. The distillery accounted for 80% of strong alcohol produced in Altai Krai and was one of the largest taxpayers in the region.

In 2018, Itkul Distillery was hit by the financial difficulties of its parent Kristall-Lefortovo and found itself unable to service its debts. In April 2019, a court seized the bank accounts of the distillery in action against Kristall-Lefortovo, and the distillery subsequently filed for insolvency in May of that year. In December 2020, the Itkul Distillery was acquired by Marussia Beverages, for which it has produced Mamont vodka since 2010. The new owner settled with Itkul's creditors and resumed the operations of the distillery. The Marussia Beverages Rus general manager Yuri Tint (Russian: Юрий Тинт) became the new general manager of the distillery. Marussia Beverages plans to re-brand existing trademarks of the Itkul Distillery and launch several new ones, including a mid-price level whiskey with a unique recipe consistent with Altai traditions.

== Heritage ==
Many of the Itkul Distillery's historic buildings constructed in the 19th century and at the beginning of the 20th century remain essentially unchanged. In 1994, the complex of distillery buildings gained the designation of a state-protected regional monument. A stela dedicated to distillery founders Konstantin Platonov and Grigory Badyin was also installed at the entrance to the modern distillery buildings. In 2006, the old alcohol shop building was turned into a museum dedicated to the history of the Itkul Distillery. The museum exhibition displays photographs, print materials, tools, interior objects, production samples, and exhibition rewards earned by the Itkul Distillery over its long period of operation.
