= Sokolovo, Zonalny District, Altai Krai =

Sokolovo Соколово сокол
- Selo
- Location within Altai Krai Location within Russia
- Coordinates: 52°31′N 84°47′E
- Country: Russia
- Region: Altai Krai
- District: Zonalny District
- Time zone: UTC+7:00

Sokolovo (Russian: Соколово) is a rural locality (a selo) and the administrative center of Sokolovsky Selsoviet, Zonalny District, Altai Krai, Russia. The population was 3,224 as of 2013. There are 42 streets.

== Geography ==
Sokolovo is located 30 km southwest of Zonalnoye (the district's administrative centre) by road. Savinovo is the nearest rural locality.
