= Tashtypsky District =

Tashtypsky District Таштыпский район (Russian)
- District

Other transcription(s)
  - Khakas: Тастып аймағы
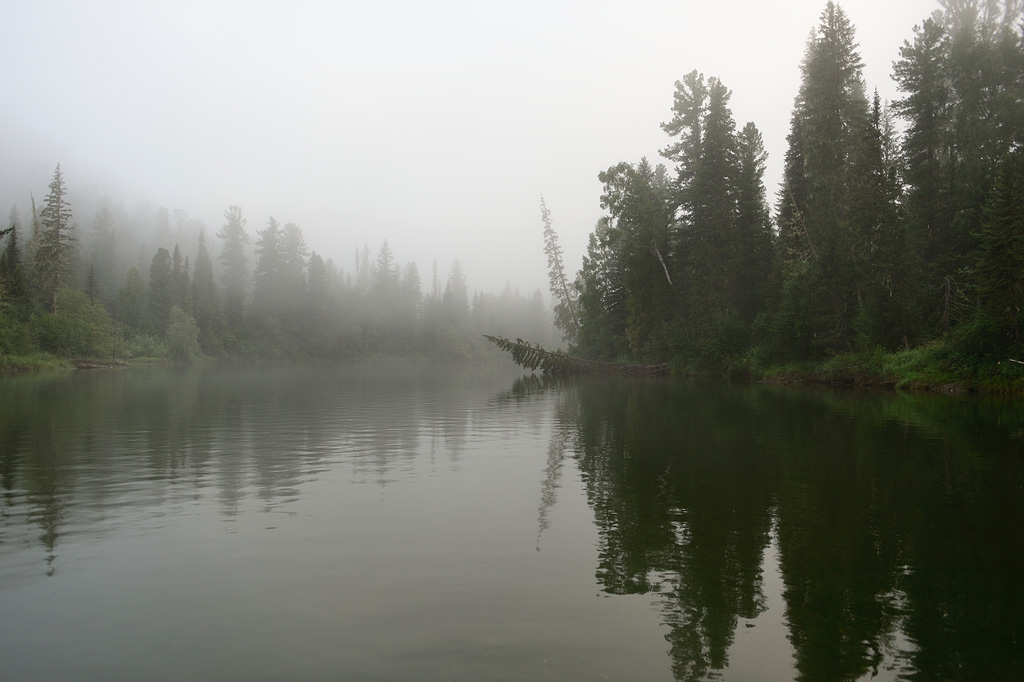
- Bolshoy Abakan river, Tashtypsky District

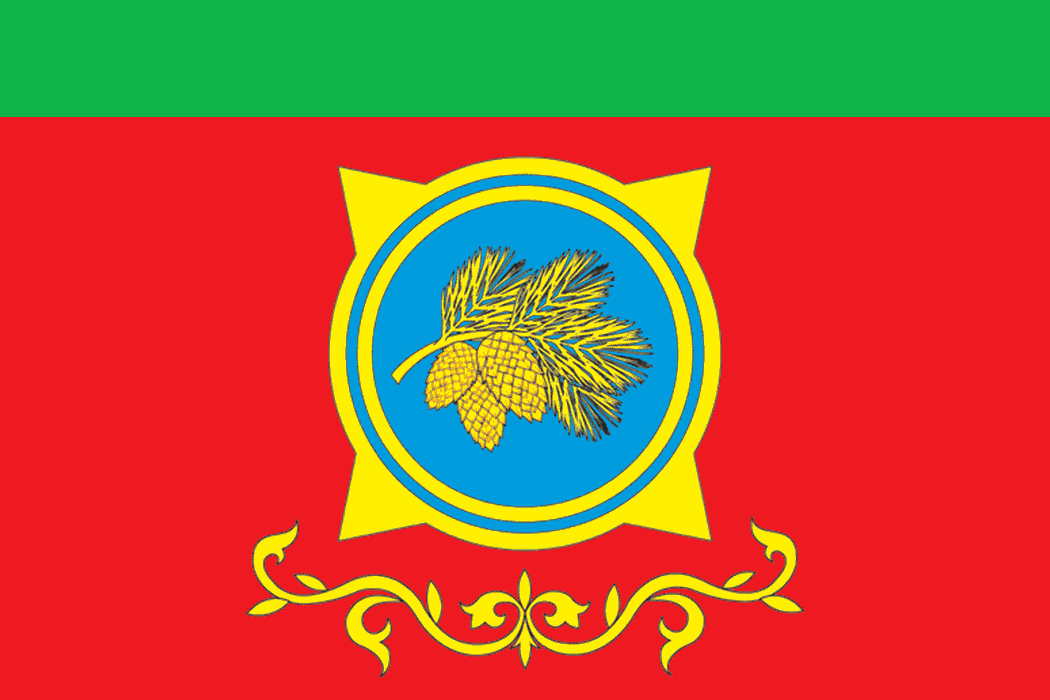
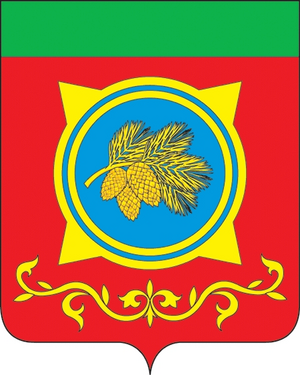
- Flag Coat of arms
- Location of Tashtypsky District in the Republic of Khakassia
- Coordinates: 52.212°N 88.267°E
- Country: Russia
- Federal subject: Republic of Khakassia
- Established: 1925
- Administrative center: Tashtyp

Area
  - Total: 20,290 km^{2} (7,830 sq mi)

Population (2010 Census)
  - Total: 16,582
  - Density: 0.8172/km^{2} (2.117/sq mi)
  - Urban: 0%
  - Rural: 100%

Administrative structure
  - Administrative divisions: 9 selsoviet
  - Inhabited localities: 32 rural localities

Municipal structure
  - Municipally incorporated as: Tashtypsky Municipal District
  - Municipal divisions: 0 urban settlements, 8 rural settlements
- Time zone: UTC+7 (MSK+4)
- OKTMO ID: 95625000

Tashtypsky District (Russian: Ташты́пский райо́н; Khakas: Тастып аймағы, Tastıp aymağı) is an administrative and municipal district (raion), one of the eight in the Republic of Khakassia, Russia. Its administrative center is the rural locality (a selo) of Tashtyp. Population: 16,582 (2010 census); 34,686 (2002 census); 36,240 (1989 Soviet census). The population of Tashtyp accounts for 38.7% of the district's total population.

== Geography ==
The district is located in the south of the republic. The area of the district is 20,290 square kilometers (7,830 sq mi). Kyzlasov Peak, the highest point of Khakassia, is located in the southern border.

== History ==
The town of Abaza used to be administratively under the jurisdiction of the district, but was elevated in status to the town of republican significance in 2003.
