= Lake Itkul =

Lake in Chelyabinsk Oblast, Russia

Itkul
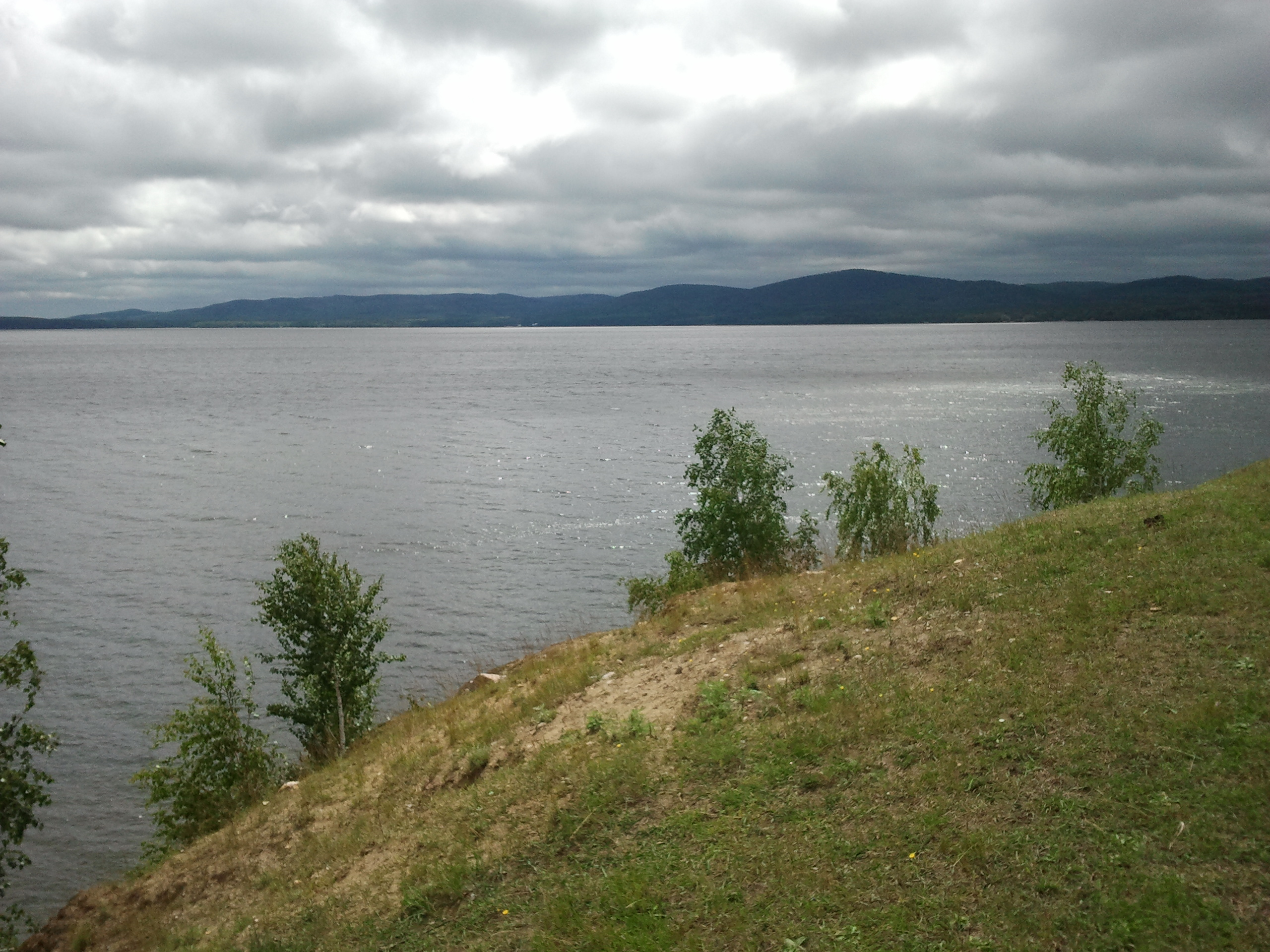
- lake Itkul

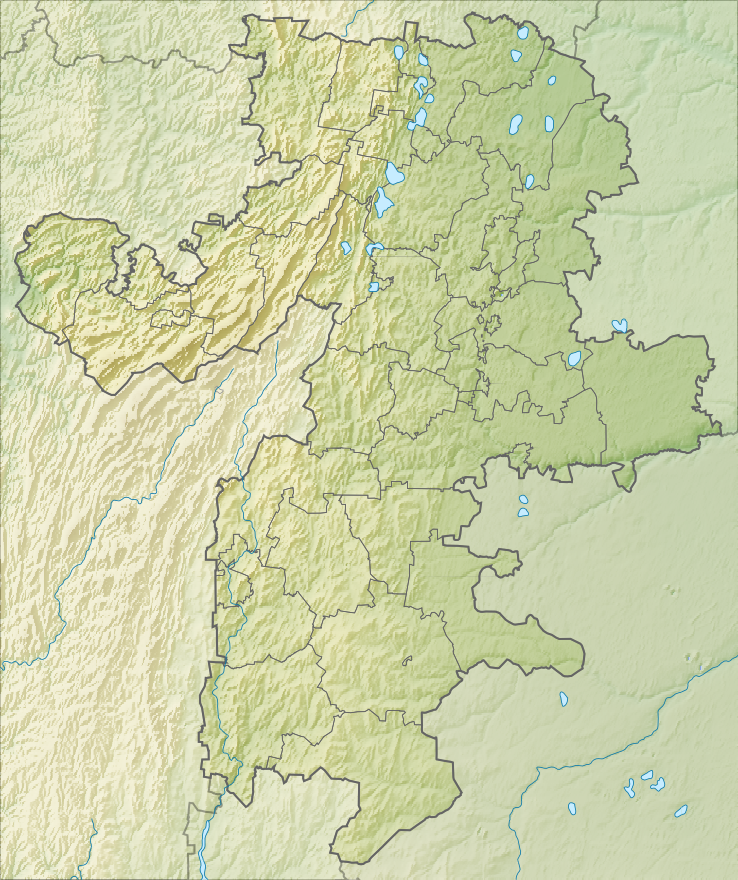
- Location within Chelyabinsk Oblast
- Coordinates: 56.09°N 60.3°E
- Primary inflows: Dolgaya, Shardatma, Zyuzelka, Karabayka, Kamenuchka
- Primary outflows: Istok
- Catchment area: 154 km^{2} (59 sq mi)
- Basin countries: Russia
- Max. length: 7 km (4.3 mi)
- Max. width: 5 km (3.1 mi)
- Surface area: 30 km^{2} (12 sq mi)
- Average depth: 7.8 m (26 ft)
- Max. depth: 16.6 m (54 ft)
- Water volume: 0.0234 km^{3} (0.0056 mi^{3})
- Surface elevation: 273 m (896 ft)
- Frozen: November–May
- Islands: 1
- Settlements: Verkhny Ufaley

Lake Itkul (Russian: Иткуль) is situated in the north of the Chelyabinsk Oblast, 20 kilometers from the town of Verkhny Ufaley. Lake Itkul was declared a natural monument.

The lake is surrounded by low summits of the Ural Mountains, the highest of them being Karabayka (544 m) on the southwestern shore of Lake Itkul. Here in Lake Itkul small river flows Karabayka.

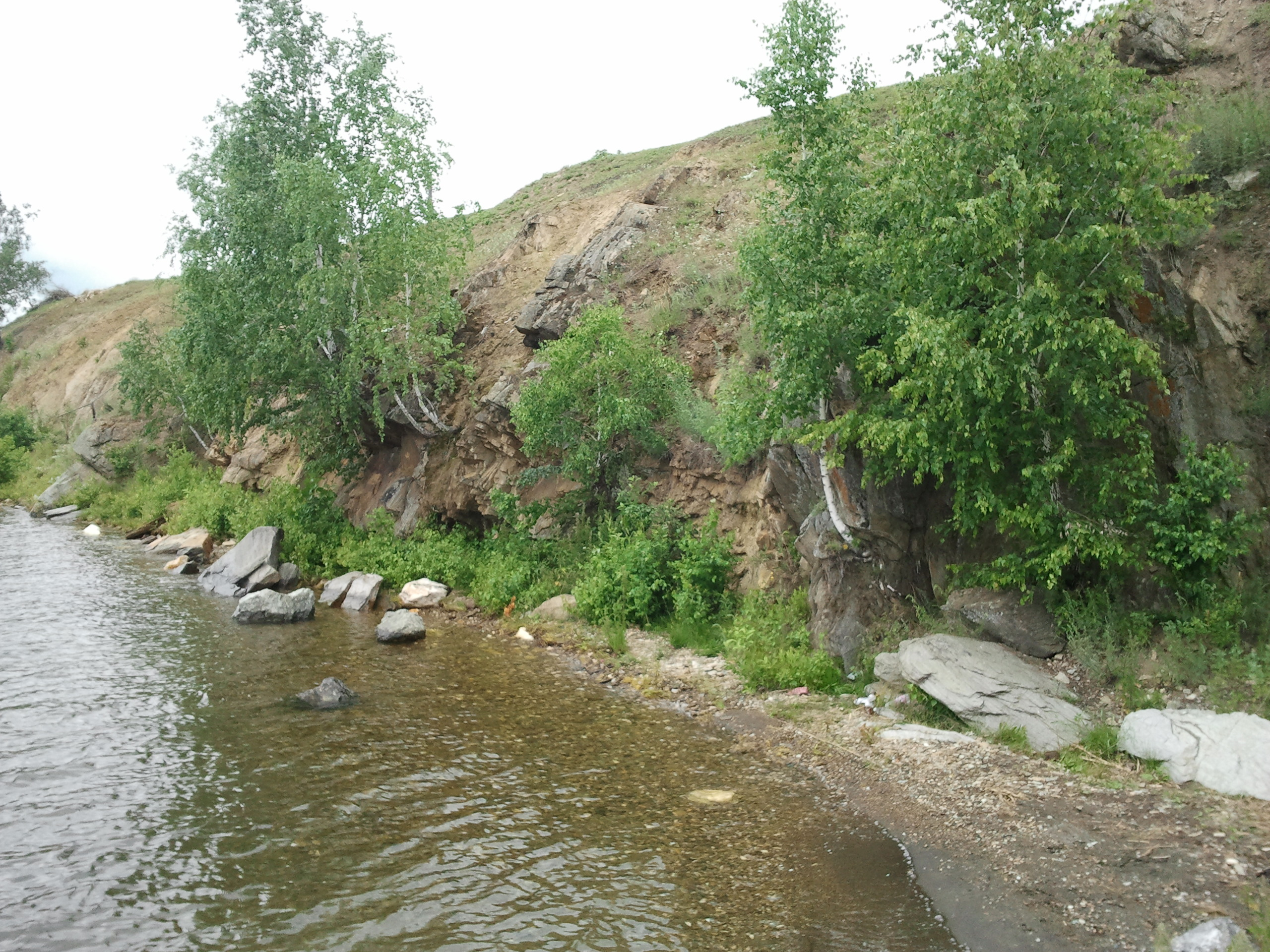
Lakeside Itkul
