= Shira, Russia =

Rural locality in Khakassia, Russia

Coordinates: 54°29′38″N 89°57′46″E

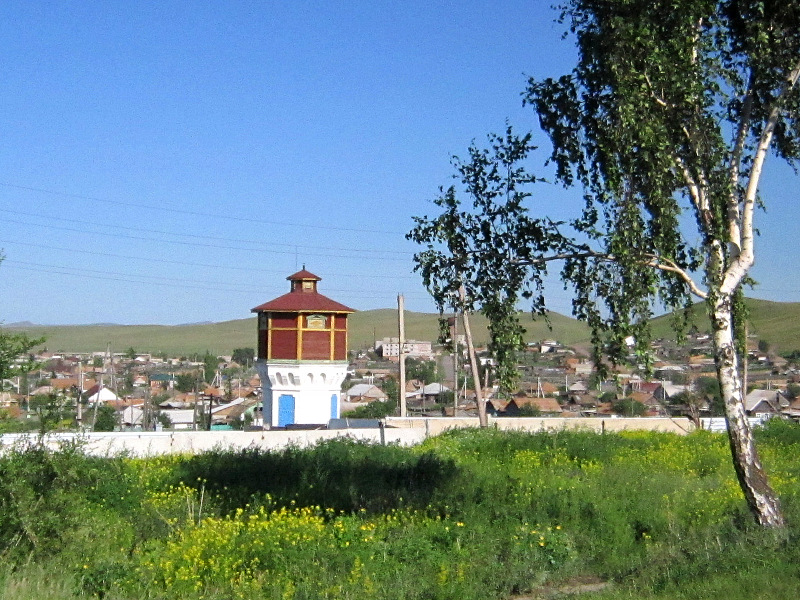
View towards Shira

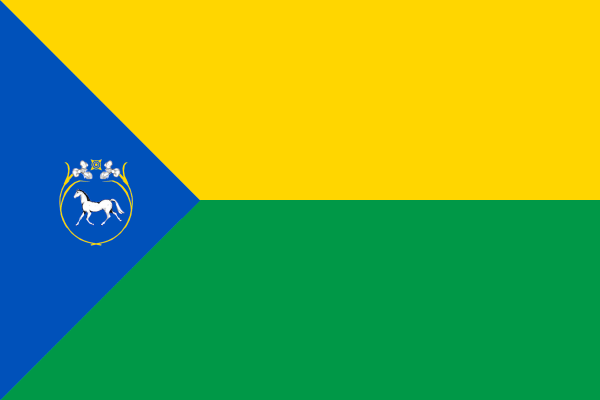
Flag of Shira

Shira (Russian: Шира; Khakas: Сыра, Sıra) is a rural locality (a selo) and the administrative center of Shirinsky District of the Republic of Khakassia, Russia. Population: 9,448 (2010 census); 9,496 (2002 census); 10,701 (1989 Soviet census).
