= List of ISO standards 3000–4999 =

This is a list of published (Note: This list generally excludes draft versions.) International Organization for Standardization (ISO) standards and other deliverables. (Note: ISO deliverables include "specifications" (ISO/PAS, ISO/TS), "reports" (ISO/TR), etc, which are not referred to by ISO as "standards".) For a complete and up-to-date list of all the ISO standards, see the ISO catalogue.

The standards are protected by copyright and most of them must be purchased. However, about 300 of the standards produced by ISO and IEC's Joint Technical Committee 1 (JTC 1) have been made freely and publicly available.

== ISO 3000 – ISO 3299 ==
- ISO 3000:1974 Sodium tripolyphosphate for industrial use — Estimation of tripolyphosphate content — Tris(ethylenediamine) cobalt (III) chloride gravimetric method [Withdrawn without replacement]
- ISO 3001:1999 Plastics — Epoxy compounds — Determination of epoxy equivalent
- ISO 3002 Basic quantities in cutting and grinding
  - ISO 3002-1:1982 Part 1: Geometry of the active part of cutting tools – General terms, reference systems, tool and working angles, chip breakers
  - ISO 3002-2:1982 Part 2: Geometry of the active part of cutting tools – General conversion formulae to relate tool and working angles
  - ISO 3002-3:1984 Part 3: Geometric and kinematic quantities in cutting
  - ISO 3002-4:1984 Part 4: Forces, energy, power
  - ISO 3002-5:1989 Part 5: Basic terminology for grinding processes using grinding wheels
- ISO 3003:1974 Dried-milk borers [Withdrawn: replaced with ISO 707]
- ISO 3004 Light gauge metal containers — Capacities and related cross-sections
  - ISO 3004-1:1986 Part 1: Open-top cans for general food [Withdrawn: replaced with ISO 10653, ISO 10654, ISO/TR 11761, ISO/TR 11762, and ISO/TR 11776]
  - ISO 3004-2:1989 Part 2: Open-top cans for meat and products containing meat for human consumption [Withdrawn: replaced with ISO 10653, ISO 10654, ISO/TR 11761, ISO/TR 11762, and ISO/TR 11776]
  - ISO 3004-3:1986 Part 3: Open-top cans for drinks
  - ISO 3004-4:1986 Part 4: Open-top cans for edible oil [Withdrawn: replaced with ISO 10653, ISO 10654, ISO/TR 11761, ISO/TR 11762, and ISO/TR 11776]
  - ISO 3004-5:1988 Part 5: Open-top cans for fish and other fishery products [Withdrawn: replaced with ISO 10653, ISO 10654, ISO/TR 11761, ISO/TR 11762, and ISO/TR 11776]
  - ISO 3004-6:1986 Part 6: Open-top cans for milk [Withdrawn: replaced with ISO 10653, ISO 10654, ISO/TR 11761, ISO/TR 11762, and ISO/TR 11776]
- ISO 3005:1978 Textiles — Determination of dimensional change of fabrics induced by free-steam
- ISO 3006:2015 Road vehicles — Passenger car wheels for road use — Test methods
- ISO 3007:1999 Petroleum products and crude petroleum — Determination of vapour pressure — Reid method
- ISO 3008 Fire resistance tests — Door and shutter assemblies
  - ISO 3008-1:2019 Part 1: General requirements
  - ISO 3008-2:2017 Part 2: Lift landing door assemblies
  - ISO 3008-3:2016 Part 3: Door and shutter assemblies horizontally oriented
  - ISO 3008-4:2021 Part 4: Linear joint fire seal materials used to seal the gap between a fire door frame and the supporting construction
- ISO 3009:2003 Fire-resistance tests — Elements of building construction — Glazed elements
- ISO 3010:2017 Bases for design of structures — Seismic actions on structures
- ISO 3011:2021 Rubber- or plastics-coated fabrics — Determination of resistance to ozone cracking under static conditions
- ISO 3012:1999 Petroleum products — Determination of thiol (mercaptan) sulfur in light and middle distillate fuels — Potentiometric method
- ISO 3013:1997 Petroleum products — Determination of the freezing point of aviation fuels
- ISO 3014:1993 Petroleum products — Determination of the smoke point of kerosine
- ISO 3015:2019 Petroleum and related products from natural or synthetic sources — Determination of cloud point
- ISO 3016:2019 Petroleum and related products from natural or synthetic sources — Determination of pour point
- ISO 3017:1981 Abrasive discs — Designation, dimensions and tolerances — Selection of disc outside diameter/centre hole diameter combinations [Withdrawn: replaced with ISO 21950]
- ISO 3018:1974 Textile floor coverings — Rectangular textile floor coverings — Determination of dimensions
- ISO 3019 Hydraulic fluid power — Dimensions and identification code for mounting flanges and shaft ends of displacement pumps and motors
  - ISO 3019-1:2001 Part 1: Inch series shown in metric units
  - ISO 3019-2:2001 Part 2: Metric series
  - ISO 3019-3:1988 Part 3: Polygonal flanges (including circular flanges) [Withdrawn: replaced with ISO 3019-2:2001]
- ISO/AWI 3020 Agricultural tractors and self-propelled sprayers — Protection of the Operator (driver) against hazardous substances [Under development; originally planned ISO 3020 Test conditions for box type vertical drilling machines — Testing of the accuracy — Practical test became ISO 2772-2]
  - ISO 3020-1 Part 1: Terminology and overview [Under development]
  - ISO 3020-2 Part 2: Cab and HVAC design concepts [Under development]
  - ISO 3020-3 Part 3: Classification, requirements and test procedures [Under development]
  - ISO 3020-4 Part 4: Filters – Requirements and test procedures [Under development]
  - ISO 3020-5 Part 5: System validation [Under development]
- ISO 3021:2023 Adventure tourism — Hiking and trekking activities — Requirements and recommendations [original draft unknown]
- ISO 3022:1988 Cinematography — 35 mm motion-picture film perforated 16 mm (1-3-0) — Cutting and perforating dimensions
- ISO 3023:1995 Cinematography — 65 mm and 70 mm unexposed motion-picture film — Cutting and perforating dimensions
- ISO 3024:1983 Cinematography — Motion-picture camera cartridge, 8 mm type S, model 1 — Camera run length, perforation cut-out and end-of-run notch in film — Specifications
- ISO 3025:1974 Cinematography — Motion-picture camera cartridge, 8 mm Type S, Model II — Film load position [Withdrawn without replacement]
- ISO 3026:1992 Cinematography — Printed 8 mm Type S image area on 35 mm motion-picture film perforated 8 mm Type S, 2R-4.227 (1664) or 5R-4.234 (1667) — Position and dimensions
- ISO 3027:1984 Cinematography — Magnetic stripes and recording head gaps for sound record on 8 mm Type S motion-picture films — Position and width dimensions [Withdrawn without replacement]
- ISO 3028:1984 Photography — Camera flash illuminants — Determination of ISO spectral distribution index (ISO/SDI)
- ISO 3029:1995 Photography – 126-size cartridges – Dimensions of cartridge, film and backing paper [Withdrawn without replacement]
- ISO 3030:2022 Rolling bearings — Radial needle roller and cage assemblies — Boundary dimensions and tolerances
- ISO 3031:2021 Rolling bearings — Thrust needle roller and cage assemblies, thrust washers — Boundary dimensions, geometrical product specifications (GPS) and tolerance values
- ISO 3032 Test conditions for pillar type vertical drilling machines — Testing of the accuracy [Draft numbered ISO 2773-2]
- ISO 3033 Oil of spearmint
  - ISO 3033-1:2005 Part 1: Native type (Mentha spicata L.)
  - ISO 3033-2:2005 Part 2: Chinese type (80% and 60%) (Mentha viridis L. var. crispa Benth.), redistilled oil
  - ISO 3033-3:2005 Part 3: Indian type (Mentha spicata L.), redistilled oil
  - ISO 3033-4:2005 Part 4: Scotch variety (Mentha x gracilis Sole)
- ISO 3034:2011 Corrugated fibreboard — Determination of single sheet thickness
- ISO 3035:2011 Corrugated fibreboard — Determination of flat crush resistance
- ISO 3036:1975 Board — Determination of puncture resistance
- ISO 3037:2013 Corrugated fibreboard — Determination of edgewise crush resistance (unwaxed edge method)
- ISO 3038:1975 Corrugated fibreboard — Determination of the water resistance of the glue bond by immersion
- ISO 3039:2010 Corrugated fibreboard — Determination of grammage of the component papers after separation
- ISO 3040:2016 Geometrical product specifications (GPS) – Dimensioning and tolerancing – Cones
- ISO 3041:1975 Welding requirements — Categories of service requirements for welded joints [Withdrawn without replacement]
- ISO 3042:1992 Cinematography — Labelling of containers for raw-stock motion-picture films and magnetic films — Minimum information specifications
- ISO 3043:1975 Oil of pimento berry [Withdrawn without replacement]
- ISO 3044:2020 Essential oil of Corymbia citriodora (Hook.) K.D. Hill and L.A.S. Johnson (syn. Eucalyptus citriodora Hook.)
- ISO 3045:2004 Oil of bay [Pimenta racemosa (Mill.) J.W. Moore]
- ISO 3046 Reciprocating internal combustion engines – Performance
  - ISO 3046-1:2002 Part 1: Declarations of power, fuel and lubricating oil consumptions, and test methods — Additional requirements for engines for general use
  - ISO 3046-2:1987 Part 2: Test methods [Withdrawn: replaced with ISO 3046-1:2002]
  - ISO 3046-3:2006 Part 3: Test measurements
  - ISO 3046-4:2009 Part 4: Speed governing
  - ISO 3046-5:2001 Part 5: Torsional vibrations
  - ISO 3046-6:2020 Part 6: Overspeed protection
  - ISO 3046-7:1995 Part 7: Codes for engine power [Withdrawn: replaced with ISO 3046-1:2002]
- ISO 3047:1982 Cinematography — Spool, daylight loading type, for 35 mm motion-picture cameras (capacity 30 m – 100 ft) — Dimensions
- ISO 3048:1974 Gypsum plasters — General test conditions [Withdrawn without replacement]
- ISO 3049:1974 Gypsum plasters — Determination of physical properties of powder [Withdrawn without replacement]
- ISO 3051:1974 Gypsum plasters — Determination of mechanical properties [Withdrawn without replacement]
- ISO 3052:1974 Gypsum plasters — Determination of water of crystallization content [Withdrawn without replacement]
- ISO 3053:2004 Oil of grapefruit (Citrus x paradisi Macfad.), obtained by expression
- ISO 3054:2017 Essential oil of lavandin Abrial (Lavandula angustifolia Mill. × Lavandula latifolia Medik.), French type
- ISO 3055:2021 Kitchen equipment — Coordinating sizes
- ISO 3056:1986 Non-calibrated round steel link lifting chain and chain slings — Use and maintenance
- ISO 3057:1998 Non-destructive testing — Metallographic replica techniques of surface examination
- ISO 3058:1998 Non-destructive testing — Aids to visual inspection — Selection of low-power magnifiers
- ISO 3059:2012 Non-destructive testing — Penetrant testing and magnetic particle testing — Viewing conditions
- ISO 3060:1974 Textiles — Cotton fibres — Determination of breaking tenacity of flat bundles
- ISO 3061:2008 Oil of black pepper (Piper nigrum L.)
- ISO 3062:1974 Oil of sandalwood (Eucarya spicata), Australia [Withdrawn without replacement]
- ISO 3063:2004 Oil of ylang-ylang (Cananga odorata (Lam.) Hook. f. et Thomson forma genuina)
- ISO 3064:2015 Essential oil of petitgrain, Paraguayan type (Citrus aurantium L. var. Paraguay (syn. Citrus aurantium var. bigaradia Hook f.))
- ISO 3065:2021 Essential oil of Eucalyptus, Australian type
- ISO 3066:1986 Duplicating machines — Registration [Withdrawn without replacement]
- ISO 3067:1983 Cinematography — Motion-picture camera cartridge, 8 mm Type S, Model I — Notches for film speed, film identification and colour-balancing filter — Dimensions and positions [Withdrawn without replacement]
- ISO 3068:1982 Cinematography — Magnetic stripes for sound records on 16 mm motion-picture film perforated 8 mm Type S-2R (1-4) and (1-3) — Positions and width dimensions [Withdrawn without replacement]
- ISO 3069:2000 End-suction centrifugal pumps — Dimensions of cavities for mechanical seals and for soft packing
- ISO 3070 Machine tools — Test conditions for testing the accuracy of boring and milling machines with horizontal spindle
  - ISO 3070-0:1982 Part 0: Introduction [Withdrawn: replaced with ISO 3070-(1-3):2007]
  - ISO 3070-1:2007 Part 1: Machines with fixed column and movable table
  - ISO 3070-2:2016 Part 2: Machines with movable column along the X-axis (floor type)
  - ISO 3070-3:2007 Part 3: Machines with movable column and movable table
- ISO 3071:2020 Textiles — Determination of pH of aqueous extract
- ISO 3072:1975 Wool — Determination of solubility in alkali
- ISO 3073:1975 Wool — Determination of acid content
- ISO 3074:2014 Wool — Determination of dichloromethane-soluble matter in combed sliver
- ISO 3075:1980 Short link chain for lifting purposes — Grade S (6) non calibrated, for chain slings etc. [Withdrawn without replacement]
- ISO 3076:2012 Round steel short link chains for general lifting purposes — Medium tolerance sling chains for chain slings — Grade 8
- ISO 3077:2001 Short-link chain for lifting purposes — Grade T, (types T, DAT and DT), fine-tolerance hoist chain
- ISO 3078:2016 Shipbuilding — Cargo winches
- ISO 3079:2022 A two-electrode method using acetic acid to measure pitting potential of aluminium and aluminium alloys in chloride solutions [original draft unknown]
- ISO 3080:1974 Guide for the mechanical balancing of marine main steam turbine machinery for merchant service [Withdrawn without replacement]
- ISO 3081:1986 Iron ores — Increment sampling — Manual method [Withdrawn: replaced with ISO 3082]
- ISO 3082:2017 Iron ores – Sampling and sample preparation procedures
- ISO 3083:1986 Iron ores — Preparation of samples — Manual method [Withdrawn: replaced with ISO 3082]
- ISO 3084:1998 Iron ores — Experimental methods for evaluation of quality variation
- ISO 3085:2019 Iron ores — Experimental methods for checking the precision of sampling, sample preparation and measurement
- ISO 3086:2006 Iron ores — Experimental methods for checking the bias of sampling
- ISO 3087:2020 Iron ores — Determination of the moisture content of a lot
- ISO 3088:1975 Welding requirements — Factors to be considered in specifying requirements for fusion welded joints in steel (technical influencing factors) [Withdrawn without replacement]
- ISO 3089:2005 Machine tools — Test conditions for self-centring, manually operated chucks with one-piece jaws
- ISO 3090:1974 Ropes and cordage — Netting yarns — Determination of change in length after immersion in water [Withdrawn without replacement]
- ISO 3091:1975 Meat and meat products — Determination of nitrate content (Reference method)
- ISO/CIE TR 3092:2023 Light and lighting – Energy performance of lighting in buildings – Explanation and justification of ISO/CIE 20086 [original draft unknown]
- ISO 3093:2009 Wheat, rye and their flours, durum wheat and durum wheat semolina — Determination of the falling number according to Hagberg-Perten
- ISO 3094:1974 Fruit and vegetable products — Determination of copper content — Photometric method [Withdrawn without replacement]
- ISO 3095:2013 Acoustics – Railway applications – Measurement of noise emitted by railbound vehicles
- ISO 3096:2018 Rolling bearings — Needle rollers — Boundary dimensions, geometrical product specifications (GPS) and tolerance values
- ISO/R 3097:1974 Rolling bearings — Needle rollers — Light and medium series — Dimensions and tolerance values [Withdrawn: replaced with ISO 1206]
- ISO 3098 Technical product documentation – Lettering
  - ISO 3098-1:2015 Part 1: General requirements
  - ISO 3098-2:2000 Part 2: Latin alphabet, numerals and marks
  - ISO 3098-3:2000 Part 3: Greek alphabet
  - ISO 3098-4:2000 Part 4: Diacritical and particular marks for the Latin alphabet
  - ISO 3098-5:1997 Part 5: CAD lettering of the Latin alphabet, numerals and marks
  - ISO 3098-6:2000 Part 6: Cyrillic alphabet
- ISO 3099:1974 Oilseed residues — Determination of total nitrogen content [Withdrawn without replacement]
- ISO 3100 Meat and meat products — Sampling and preparation of test samples
  - ISO 3100-1:1991 Part 1: Sampling [Withdrawn: replaced with ISO 17604]
  - ISO 3100-2:1998 Part 2: Preparation of test samples for microbiological examination [Withdrawn: replaced with ISO 6887-2]
- ISO 3101:1981 Wheels and castors — Triangular top plates with three fixing holes [Withdrawn: replaced with ISO 22883 and ISO 22884]
- ISO 3102:1981 Wheels and castors for non-powered equipment — Off-set for swivel castors [Withdrawn: replaced with ISO 22883 and ISO 22884]
- ISO 3103 Tea – Preparation of liquor for use in sensory tests
- ISO 3104:2020 Petroleum products — Transparent and opaque liquids — Determination of kinematic viscosity and calculation of dynamic viscosity
- ISO 3105:1994 Glass capillary kinematic viscometers – Specifications and operating instructions
- ISO 3106:1974 Dental zinc oxide/eugenol filling materials [Withdrawn: replaced with ISO 3107]
- ISO 3107:2022 Dentistry — Zinc oxide/eugenol cements and zinc oxide/non-eugenol cements
- ISO 3108:2017 Steel wire ropes — Test method — Determination of measured breaking force
- ISO 3109:1984 Assembly tools for screws and nuts — Hexagon insert bits for hexagon socket head screws [Withdrawn: replaced with ISO 2351-3]
- ISO 3110:1975 Copper alloys — Determination of aluminium as alloying element — Volumetric method [Withdrawn without replacement]
- ISO 3111:1975 Copper alloys — Determination of tin as alloying element — Volumetric method [Withdrawn without replacement]
- ISO 3112:1975 Copper and copper alloys — Determination of lead — Extracting titration method [Withdrawn without replacement]
- ISO 3114:1977 Unplasticized polyvinyl chloride (PVC) pipes for potable water supply — Extractability of lead and tin — Test method
- ISO 3115:1981 Castings in magnesium alloys containing zirconium — Chemical composition and mechanical properties [Withdrawn: replaced with ISO 16220]
- ISO 3116:2019 Magnesium and magnesium alloys — Wrought magnesium and magnesium alloys
- ISO 3117:1977 Tangential keys and keyways [Withdrawn without replacement]
- ISO 3118:1976 Sodium perborates for industrial use — Determination of particle size distribution by mechanical sieving [Withdrawn without replacement]
- ISO 3119:1976 Boric acid, boric oxide and disodium tetraborates for industrial use — Determination of chromium content — Diphenylcarbazide photometric method [Withdrawn without replacement]
- ISO 3120:1976 diSodium tetraborates and crude sodium borates for industrial use — Determination of water content — Gravimetric method [Withdrawn without replacement]
- ISO 3121:1976 Boric acid, boric oxide and disodium tetraborates for industrial use — Determination of chloride content — Mercurimetric method [Withdrawn without replacement]
- ISO 3122:1976 Boric acid, boric oxide, disodium tetraborates, sodium perborates and crude borates for industrial use — Determination of iron content — 2,2'- Bipyridyl photometric method [Withdrawn without replacement]
- ISO 3123:1976 Sodium perborates for industrial use — Determination of rate of solution — Conductivity method [Withdrawn without replacement]
- ISO 3124:1976 Crude sodium borates for industrial use — Determination of iron soluble in alkaline medium — 2,2'- Bipyridyl photometric method [Withdrawn without replacement]
- ISO 3125:1976 Crude sodium borates for industrial use — Determination of aluminium soluble in alkaline medium — EDTA titrimetric method [Withdrawn without replacement]
- ISO 3126:2005 Plastics piping systems — Plastics components — Determination of dimensions
- ISO 3127:1994 Thermoplastics pipes — Determination of resistance to external blows — Round-the-clock method
- ISO 3129:2019 Wood — Sampling methods and general requirements for physical and mechanical testing of small clear wood specimens
- ISO 3130:1975 Wood — Determination of moisture content for physical and mechanical tests [Withdrawn: replaced with ISO 13061-1]
- ISO 3131:1975 Wood — Determination of density for physical and mechanical tests [Withdrawn: replaced with ISO 13061-2]
- ISO 3132:1975 Wood — Testing in compression perpendicular to grain [Withdrawn: replaced with ISO 13061-5]
- ISO 3133:1975 Wood — Determination of ultimate strength in static bending [Withdrawn: replaced with ISO 13061-3]
- ISO 3134 Light metals and their alloys — Terms and definitions
  - ISO 3134-1:1985 Part 1: Materials [Withdrawn without replacement]
  - ISO 3134-2:1985 Part 2: Unwrought products [Withdrawn without replacement]
  - ISO 3134-3:1985 Part 3: Wrought products [Withdrawn without replacement]
  - ISO 3134-4:1985 Part 4: Castings [Withdrawn without replacement]
  - ISO 3134-5:1981 Part 5: Methods of processing and treatment [Withdrawn without replacement]
- ISO 3135:2025 Marking pens — Durability of written line — Documentary use (DOC) [Original draft with this number unknown]
- ISO 3136:2023 Rubber latex — Styrene-butadiene — Determination of bound styrene content
- ISO 3137:1974 Anhydrous hydrogen fluoride for industrial use — Sampling
- ISO 3138:1974 Anhydrous hydrogen fluoride for industrial use — Determination of non-volatile acid content — Titrimetric method [Withdrawn without replacement]
- ISO 3139:1976 Aqueous hydrofluoric acid for industrial use — Sampling and methods of test
- ISO 3140:2019 Essential oil of sweet orange expressed [Citrus sinensis (L.)]
- ISO 3141:1997 Oil of clove leaves [Syzygium aromaticum (L.) Merr. et Perry, syn. Eugenia caryophyllus (Sprengel) Bullock et S. Harrison]
- ISO 3142:1997 Oil of clove buds [Syzygium aromaticum (L.) Merr. et Perry, syn. Eugenia caryophyllus (Sprengel) Bullock et S. Harrison]
- ISO 3143:1997 Oil of clove stems [Syzygium aromaticum (L.) Merr. et Perry, syn. Eugenia caryophyllus (Sprengel) Bullock et S. Harrison]
- ISO 3144:1974 Carbon disulphide for industrial use — Sampling and methods of test
- ISO 3145:1974 Rolling bearings — Bearings with spherical outside surface and extended inner ring width — Eccentric locking collars [Withdrawn: replaced with ISO 9628]
- ISO 3146:2000 Plastics — Determination of melting behaviour (melting temperature or melting range) of semi-crystalline polymers by capillary tube and polarizing-microscope methods
- ISO 3147:1975 Heat exchangers — Verification of thermal balance of water-fed or steam-fed primary circuits — Principles and test requirements [Withdrawn without replacement]
- ISO 3148:1975 Radiators, convectors and similar appliances — Determination of thermal output — Test method using air-cooled closed booth [Withdrawn without replacement]
- ISO 3149:1975 Radiators, convectors and similar appliances — Determination of thermal output — Test method using liquid-cooled closed booth [Withdrawn without replacement]
- ISO 3150:1975 Radiators, convectors and similar appliances — Calculation of thermal output and presentation of results [Withdrawn without replacement]
- ISO/TR 3151 Visualization elements of PLM-MES interface [originally planned draft with this number was an engineering standard]
  - ISO/TR 3151-1:2023 Part 1: Overview
  - ISO/TR 3151-2:2025 Part 2: 3D error feedback in heavy industry
- ISO/TR 3152:2022 Road vehicles — Comparison between ISO 26262-12 and other parts of the ISO 26262 series to support motorcycle adaptation
- ISO 3153 Mechanical vibration — Posture in whole-body vibration environments [Under development; original draft with this number unknown]
- ISO 3154:1988 Stranded wire ropes for mine hoisting — Technical delivery requirements
- ISO 3155:1976 Stranded wire ropes for mine hoisting — Fibre components — Characteristics and tests
- ISO 3156:1976 Stranded wire ropes for mine hoisting — Impregnating compounds, lubricants and service dressings — Characteristics and tests
- ISO 3157:1991 Radioluminescence for time measurement instruments — Specifications [Withdrawn without replacement]
- ISO 3158:1976 Timekeeping instruments — Symbolization of control positions
- ISO 3159:2009 Timekeeping instruments — Wrist-chronometers with spring balance oscillator
- ISO 3160 Watch-cases and accessories — Gold alloy coverings
  - ISO 3160-1:1998 Part 1: General requirements
  - ISO 3160-2:2015 Part 2: Determination of fineness, thickness, corrosion resistance and adhesion
  - ISO 3160-3:1993 Part 3: Abrasion resistance tests of a type of coating on standard gauges [Withdrawn: replaced with ISO 23160]
- ISO 3161:1999 Aerospace — UNJ threads — General requirements and limit dimensions
- ISO 3162:1974 Caravans and light trailers — Couplings for vacuum braking systems — Dimensional characteristics [Withdrawn without replacement]
- ISO 3163:2022 Adventure tourism — Terminology [original draft unknown]
- ISO 3164:2013 Earth-moving machinery — Laboratory evaluations of protective structures — Specifications for deflection-limiting volume
- ISO 3165:1976 Sampling of chemical products for industrial use — Safety in sampling
- ISO 3166: Codes for the representation of names of countries and their subdivisions
  - ISO 3166-1:2020 Part 1: Country codes
  - ISO 3166-2:2020 Part 2: Country subdivision code
  - ISO 3166-3:2020 Part 3: Code for formerly used names of countries
- ISO 3167:2014 Plastics — Multipurpose test specimens
- ISO 3168:1998 Aerospace — Nuts, anchor, self-locking, fixed, single lug, with counterbore, with MJ threads, classifications: 1 100 MPa (at ambient temperature )/235 degrees C, 1 100 MPa (at ambient temperature )/315 degrees C and 1 100 MPa (at ambient temperature)/425 degrees C — Dimensions
- ISO 3169:2023 Fine ceramics (advanced ceramics, advanced technical ceramics) — Methods for chemical analysis of impurities in aluminium oxide powders using inductively coupled plasma-optical emission spectrometry [original draft unknown]
- ISO 3170:2004 Petroleum liquids — Manual sampling
- ISO 3171:1988 Petroleum liquids — Automatic pipeline sampling
- ISO/TR 3172:1974 Paints and varnishes — Large scale brushing test [Withdrawn without replacement]
- ISO 3173:1974 Road vehicles — Apparatus for measurement of the opacity of exhaust gas from diesel engines operating under steady state conditions [Withdrawn: replaced with ISO 11614]
- ISO 3174:1994 Aircraft — Connections for checking hydraulic systems by ground appliances — Threaded type
- ISO 3175 Textiles — Professional care, drycleaning and wetcleaning of fabrics and garments
  - ISO 3175-1:2017 Part 1: Assessment of performance after cleaning and finishing
  - ISO 3175-2:2017 Part 2: Procedure for testing performance when cleaning and finishing using tetrachloroethene
  - ISO 3175-3:2017 Part 3: Procedure for testing performance when cleaning and finishing using hydrocarbon solvents
  - ISO 3175-4:2018 Part 4: Procedure for testing performance when cleaning and finishing using simulated wetcleaning
  - ISO 3175-5:2019 Part 5: Procedure for testing performance when cleaning and finishing using dibutoxymethane
  - ISO 3175-6:2017 Part 6: Procedure for testing performance when cleaning and finishing using decamethylpentacyclosiloxane
- ISO 3176 Textiles — Determination of dimensional stability on dry cleaning in perchloroethylene, excluding finishing laboratory method [Rejected draft]
- ISO 3177:1975 Potassium hydroxide for industrial use — Determination of chlorides content — Photometric method [Withdrawn without replacement]
- ISO 3178:1988 Steel wire ropes for general purposes — Terms of acceptance [Withdrawn without replacement]
- ISO 3179:1974 Coniferous sawn timber — Nominal dimensions [Withdrawn without replacement]
- ISO 3180:2023 Fine ceramics (advanced ceramics, advanced technical ceramics) — Methods for chemical analysis of hydroxyapatite powders [original draft merged into ISO 3179]
- ISO 3181 Nanotechnologies — Total, encapsulated, and free drug quantitation in doxorubicin hydrochloride liposomal formulations using reversed phase high performance liquid chromatography (RP-HPLC) [Under development; original draft merged into ISO 3179]
- ISO 3182:2022 Light Measuring System for Smoke Emission Testing [original draft merged into ISO 3179]
- ISO 3183:2019 Petroleum and natural gas industries — Steel pipe for pipeline transportation systems
- ISO 3184:1998 Reach and straddle fork-lift trucks — Stability tests [Withdrawn: replaced with ISO 22915-3]
- ISO 3185:2021 Aerospace — Bolts, normal bihexagonal head, normal shank, short or medium length MJ threads, metallic material, coated or uncoated, strength classes less than or equal to 1 100 MPa — Dimensions
- ISO 3186:2008 Aerospace — Bolts, large bihexagonal head, normal shank, short or medium length MJ threads, metallic material, coated or uncoated, strength classes 1 250 MPa to 1 800 MPa — Dimensions
- ISO 3187:1989 Refractory products — Determination of creep in compression
- ISO 3188:1978 Starches and derived products — Determination of nitrogen content by the Kjeldahl method — Titrimetric method
- ISO 3189 Sockets for wire ropes for general purposes
  - ISO 3189-1:1985 Part 1: General characteristics and conditions of acceptance [Withdrawn without replacement]
  - ISO 3189-2:1985 Part 2: Special requirements for sockets produced by forging or machined from the solid [Withdrawn without replacement]
  - ISO 3189-3:1985 Part 3: Special requirements for sockets produced by casting [Withdrawn without replacement]
- ISO 3190:1975 Test conditions for turret and single spindle co-ordinate drilling machines with vertical spindle — Testing of the accuracy
- ISO 3191:1998 Aerospace — Nuts, anchor, self-locking, fixed, single lug, reduced series, with counterbore, with MJ threads, classifications: 1 100 MPa (at ambient temperature)/235 degrees C, 1 100 MPa (at ambient temperature)/315 degrees C and 1 100 MPa (at ambient temperature)/425 degrees C — Dimensions
- ISO 3193:2008 Aerospace — Bolts, normal hexagonal head, normal shank, short or medium length MJ threads, metallic material, coated or uncoated, strength classes less than or equal to 1 100 MPa — Dimensions
- ISO 3194:1975 Potassium hydroxide for industrial use — Determination of sulphur compounds — Method by reduction and titrimetry [Withdrawn without replacement]
- ISO 3195:1975 Sodium hydroxide for industrial use — Sampling — Test Sample — Preparation of the main solution for carrying out certain determinations [Withdrawn without replacement]
- ISO 3196:1975 Sodium hydroxide for industrial use — Determination of carbonates content — Titrimetric method
- ISO 3197:1975 Sodium hydroxide for industrial use — Determination of chlorides content — Photometric method [Withdrawn without replacement]
- ISO 3198:1975 Sodium hydroxide for industrial use — Determination of sulphur compounds — Method by reduction and titrimetry [Withdrawn without replacement]
- ISO 3199:1975 Sodium chlorate for industrial use — Determination of chlorate content — Dichromate titrimetric method
- ISO 3200:1975 Sodium and potassium silicates for industrial use — Determination of sulphates content — Barium sulphate gravimetric method [Withdrawn without replacement]
- ISO 3201:1975 Sodium and potassium silicates for industrial use — Determination of iron content — 1,10- Phenanthroline photometric method [Withdrawn without replacement]
- ISO 3202:1997 Aerospace — Screws, pan head, internal offset cruciform ribbed or unribbed drive, threaded to head, MJ threads, metallic material, coated or uncoated, strength classes less than or equal to 1 100 MPa — Dimensions
- ISO 3203:1993 Aerospace — Bolts, normal bihexagonal head, normal or pitch diameter shank, long length MJ threads, metallic material, coated or uncoated, strength classes less than or equal to 1 100 MPa — Dimensions
- ISO 3205:1976 Preferred test temperatures [Withdrawn without replacement]
- ISO 3206:1975 Surface active agents — Analysis of technical alkane sulphonates — Determination of alkane monosulphonates content [Withdrawn without replacement]
- ISO 3207:1975 Statistical interpretation of data — Determination of a statistical tolerance interval [Withdrawn: replaced with ISO 16269-6]
- ISO 3208:1974 Road vehicles — Evaluation of protrusions inside passenger cars
- ISO 3209:2016 Aerospace — Nuts, anchor, self-locking, floating, two lug, with counterbore, with MJ threads, classifications: 1 100 MPa (at ambient temperature )/235 degrees C, 1 100 MPa (at ambient temperature )/315 degrees C and 1 100 MPa (at ambient temperature)/425 degrees C — Dimensions
- ISO 3210:2017 Anodizing of aluminium and its alloys — Assessment of quality of sealed anodic oxidation coatings by measurement of the loss of mass after immersion in acid solution(s)
- ISO 3211:2018 Anodizing of aluminium and its alloys — Assessment of resistance of anodic oxidation coatings to cracking by deformation
- ISO 3212:1975 Polypropylene pipes — Burst test requirements [Withdrawn without replacement]
- ISO 3213:2009 Polypropylene (PP) pipes — Effect of time and temperature on the expected strength
- ISO 3214:2000 Oil of Litsea cubeba (Litsea cubeba Pers.)
- ISO 3215:1998 Oil of nutmeg, Indonesian type (Myristica fragrans Houtt.)
- ISO 3216:1997 Oil of cassia, Chinese type (Cinnamomum aromaticum Nees, syn. Cinnamomum cassia Nees ex Blume)
- ISO 3217:1974 Oil of lemongrass (Cymbopogon citratus)
- ISO 3218:2014 Essential oils — Principles of nomenclature
- ISO 3219 Rheology
  - ISO 3219-1:2021 Part 1: Vocabulary and symbols for rotational and oscillatory rheometry
  - ISO 3219-2:2021 Part 2: General principles of rotational and oscillatory rheometry
- ISO 3220:1975 Copper and copper alloys — Determination of arsenic — Photometric method
- ISO 3221:1998 Aerospace — Nuts, anchor, self-locking, fixed, 90 degrees corner, with counterbore, with MJ threads, classifications: 1 100 MPa (at ambient temperature)/235 degrees C, 1 100 MPa (at ambient temperature)/315 degrees C and 1 100 MPa (at ambient temperature)/425 degrees C — Dimensions
- ISO 3222:1998 Aerospace — Nuts, anchor, self-locking, fixed, closed corner, reduced series, with counterbore, with MJ threads, classifications: 1 100 MPa (at ambient temperature)/235 degrees C, 1 100 MPa (at ambient temperature)/315 degrees C and 1 100 MPa (at ambient temperature)/425 degrees C — Dimensions
- ISO 3223:1998 Aerospace — Nuts, anchor, self-locking, fixed, two lug, with counterbore, with MJ threads, classifications: 1 100 MPa (at ambient temperature )/235 degrees C, 1 100 MPa (at ambient temperature )/315 degrees C and 1 100 MPa (at ambient temperature)/425 degrees C — Dimensions
- ISO 3224:1998 Aerospace — Nuts, anchor, self-locking, floating, single lug, with counterbore, with MJ threads, classifications: 1 100 MPa (at ambient temperature )/235 degrees C, 1 100 MPa (at ambient temperature )/315 degrees C and 1 100 MPa (at ambient temperature)/425 degrees C — Dimensions
- ISO 3225:1998 Aerospace — Nuts, anchor, self-locking, fixed, two lug, reduced series, with counterbore, with MJ threads, classifications: 1 100 MPa (at ambient temperature)/235 degrees C, 1 100 MPa (at ambient temperature)/315 degrees C and 1 100 MPa (at ambient temperature)/425 degrees C — Dimensions
- ISO 3228:2013 Rolling bearings — Cast and pressed housings for insert bearings — Boundary dimensions and tolerances
- ISO 3230:1998 Aerospace — Rivets, solid, 100 degrees normal countersunk head with dome, metallic material, with or without surface treatment — Dimensions
- ISO 3231:1993 Paints and varnishes — Determination of resistance to humid atmospheres containing sulfur dioxide [Withdrawn: replaced with ISO 22479]
- ISO 3232:1974 Paints and varnishes — Determination of quantity of material in a container [Withdrawn without replacement]
- ISO 3233 Paints and varnishes — Determination of percentage volume of non-volatile matter
  - ISO 3233-1:2019 Part 1: Method using a coated test panel to determine non-volatile matter and to determine dry-film density by the Archimedes' principle
  - ISO 3233-2:2019 Part 2: Method using the determination of non-volatile-matter content in accordance with ISO 3251 and determination of dry film density on coated test panels by the Archimedes' principle
  - ISO 3233-3:2015 Part 3: Determination by calculation from the non-volatile-matter content determined in accordance with ISO 3251, the density of the coating material and the density of the solvent in the coating material
- ISO 3234:1975 Sodium sulphate for industrial use — Determination of loss in mass at 110 degrees C [Withdrawn without replacement]
- ISO 3235:1975 Sodium sulphate for industrial use — Determination of acid-insoluble matter [Withdrawn without replacement]
- ISO 3236:1975 Sodium sulphate for industrial use — Determination of chlorides content — Mercurimetric method [Withdrawn without replacement]
- ISO 3237:1975 Sodium sulphate for industrial use — Determination of sulphates content — Calculation method and barium sulphate gravimetric method [Withdrawn without replacement]
- ISO 3238:1975 Sodium sulphate for industrial use — Determination of calcium content — EDTA complexometric method [Withdrawn without replacement]
- ISO 3239:1975 Sodium sulphate for industrial use — Determination of iron content — 1,10- Phenanthroline photometric method [Withdrawn without replacement]
- ISO 3240:1975 Sodium sulphate for industrial use — Determination of acidity or alkalinity [Withdrawn without replacement]
- ISO 3241:1975 Sodium sulphate for industrial use — Measurement of pH — Potentiometric method [Withdrawn without replacement]
- ISO/TR 3242:2022 Blockchain and distributed ledger technologies – Use cases [original draft unknown]
- ISO 3243:1975 Keyboards for countries whose languages have alphabetic extenders — Guidelines for harmonization [Withdrawn: replaced with ISO 9995-(1,7)]
- ISO 3244:1984 Office machines and data processing equipment — Principles governing the positioning of control keys on keyboards [Withdrawn: replaced with ISO 9995-(1,7)]
- ISO 3245:2015 Rolling bearings — Needle roller bearings with drawn cup and without inner ring — Boundary dimensions, geometrical product specifications (GPS) and tolerance values
- ISO 3246:1977 Dentistry — Working space of the dentist — Definitions and principles [Withdrawn without replacement]
- ISO 3247 Mosaic parquet panels — Classification of oak strips [Rejected draft]
- ISO 3248:2016 Paints and varnishes — Determination of the effect of heat
- ISO 3249:1975 Reciprocating internal combustion engines — Definitions of locations on an engine [Withdrawn: replaced with ISO 1204]
- ISO/TS 3250:2021 Petroleum, petrochemical and natural gas industries — Calculation and reporting production efficiency in the operating phase [Original draft with this number unknown]
- ISO 3251:2019 Paints, varnishes and plastics — Determination of non-volatile-matter content
- ISO 3252:2019 Powder metallurgy – Vocabulary
- ISO 3253:1998 Gas welding equipment — Hose connections for equipment for welding, cutting and allied processes [Withdrawn: replaced with ISO/TR 28821]
- ISO 3254:1989 Shipbuilding and marine structures — Toughened safety glass panes for rectangular windows [Withdrawn: replaced with ISO 21005]
- ISO 3255:1974 Magnesium and magnesium alloys — Determination of aluminium — Chromazurol S photometric method
- ISO 3256:1977 Aluminium and aluminium alloys — Determination of magnesium — Atomic absorption spectrophotometric method
- ISO 3257:1992 Rubber compounding ingredients — Carbon black — Method of evaluation in styrene-butadiene rubbers [Withdrawn without replacement]
- ISO 3258:1976 Air distribution and air diffusion — Vocabulary [Withdrawn without replacement]
- ISO 3259 Pulps — Determination of pentosans content — Furfural method [Rejected draft]
- ISO 3260:2015 Pulps — Determination of chlorine consumption (Degree of delignification)
- ISO 3261:1975 Fire tests — Vocabulary [Withdrawn without replacement]
- ISO 3262 Extenders — Specifications and methods of test
  - ISO 3262-1:2020 Part 1: Introduction and general test methods
  - ISO 3262-2:1998 Part 2: Barytes (natural barium sulfate)
  - ISO 3262-3:1998 Part 3: Blanc fixe
  - ISO 3262-4:1998 Part 4: Whiting
  - ISO 3262-5:1998 Part 5: Natural crystalline calcium carbonate
  - ISO 3262-6:1998 Part 6: Precipitated calcium carbonate
  - ISO 3262-7:1998 Part 7: Dolomite
  - ISO 3262-8:1998 Part 8: Natural clay
  - ISO 3262-9:1997 Part 9: Calcined clay
  - ISO 3262-10:2000 Part 10: Natural talc/chlorite in lamellar form
  - ISO 3262-11:2000 Part 11: Natural talc, in lamellar form, containing carbonates
  - ISO 3262-12:2001 Part 12: Muscovite-type mica
  - ISO 3262-13:1997 Part 13: Natural quartz (ground)
  - ISO 3262-14:2000 Part 14: Cristobalite
  - ISO 3262-15:2000 Part 15: Vitreous silica
  - ISO 3262-16:2000 Part 16: Aluminium hydroxides
  - ISO 3262-17:2000 Part 17: Precipitated calcium silicate
  - ISO 3262-18:2000 Part 18: Precipitated sodium aluminium silicate
  - ISO 3262-19:2021 Part 19: Precipitated silica
  - ISO 3262-20:2021 Part 20: Fumed silica
  - ISO 3262-21:2000 Part 21: Silica sand (unground natural quartz)
  - ISO 3262-22:2000 Part 22: Flux-calcined kieselguhr
- ISO 3263:1974 Continuous mechanical handling equipment for loose bulk materials — Bucket elevators — Safety code [Withdrawn: replaced with ISO 7149]
- ISO 3264:1974 Continuous mechanical handling equipment for loose bulk materials — Screw feeders and conveyors — Safety code [Withdrawn: replaced with ISO 7149]
- ISO 3265:1974 Continuous mechanical handling equipment for loose bulk materials — Wagon tipplers handling rail-borne wagons (rotary, side discharge and end discharge) — Safety code
- ISO 3266:2010 Forged steel eyebolts grade 4 for general lifting purposes
- ISO 3267:1991 Road vehicles — Headlamp cleaners [Withdrawn without replacement]
- ISO 3268:1978 Plastics — Glass reinforced materials — Determination of tensile properties [Withdrawn: replaced with ISO 527-(4-5)]
- ISO 3269:2019 Fasteners — Acceptance inspection
- ISO 3270:1984 Paints and varnishes and their raw materials — Temperatures and humidities for conditioning and testing
- ISO 3271:2015 Iron ores for blast furnace and direct reduction feedstocks — Determination of the tumble and abrasion indices
- ISO 3272 Microfilming of technical drawings and other drawing office documents
  - ISO 3272-1:2003 Part 1: Operating procedures
  - ISO 3272-2:1994 Part 2: Quality criteria and control of 35 mm silver gelatin microfilms
  - ISO 3272-3:2001 Part 3: Aperture card for 35 mm microfilm
  - ISO 3272-4:1994 Part 4: Microfilming of drawings of special and exceptional elongated sizes
  - ISO 3272-5:1999 Part 5: Test procedures for diazo duplicating of microfilm images in aperture cards [Withdrawn without replacement]
  - ISO 3272-6:2000 Part 6: Quality criteria and control of systems for enlargements from 35 mm microfilm
- ISO 3273 Transparent A6 Microfiche – Additional physical characteristics [Rejected draft]
- ISO 3274:1996 Geometrical Product Specifications (GPS) – Surface texture: Profile method – Nominal characteristics of contact (stylus) instruments [Withdrawn: replaced with ISO 25178-601]
- ISO 3275:1974 Information processing – Implementation of the 7- bit coded character set and its 7- bit and 8- bit extensions on 3,81 mm magnetic cassette for data interchange
- ISO 3276:1975 Continuous mechanical handling equipment for unit loads — Belt conveyors (canvas, rubber, plastic, etc.), steel band conveyors and wire mesh belt conveyors — Safety code [Withdrawn: replaced with ISO 7149]
- ISO 3277:1974 Continuous mechanical handling equipment for unit loads — Suspended swing-tray conveyors and fixed-tray conveyors — Safety code [Withdrawn: replaced with ISO 7149]
- ISO 3278:1974 Continuous mechanical handling equipment for unit loads — Canvas-sling elevators and conveyors — Safety code [Withdrawn: replaced with ISO 7149]
- ISO 3279:1974 Continuous mechanical handling equipment for unit loads — Hydraulic conveyors — Safety code [Withdrawn: replaced with ISO 7149]
- ISO 3280:1974 Continuous mechanical handling equipment for unit loads — Gravity roller and wheel conveyors, extensible-roller or telescopic-roller conveyors, and hinged-roller conveyors (gates) — Safety code [Withdrawn: replaced with ISO 7149]
- ISO 3281:1974 Continuous mechanical handling equipment for unit loads — Spiral roller conveyor chutes, spiral chutes, and chutes for packages — Safety code [Withdrawn: replaced with ISO 7149]
- ISO 3282:1976 Aircraft — Dimensions for single-hole and triple-hole mounting (Class 3) lever-operated manual switches
- ISO 3283:1974 Continuous mechanical handling equipment — Transfer points — Safety code [Withdrawn: replaced with ISO 7149]
- ISO 3284:1974 Continuous mechanical handling equipment for loose bulk materials — Dimensions of bends for use in pneumatic handling
- ISO 3285:1986 Road vehicles — Ignition coil mounting brackets [Withdrawn without replacement]
- ISO 3286:2016 Single point cutting tools — Corner radii
- ISO 3287:1999 Powered industrial trucks – Symbols for operator controls and other displays
- ISO 3288 Individual space heating appliances — General test methods [Rejected draft]
- ISO 3289 Independent room heaters burnings solid fuel — Particular test methods [Rejected draft]
- ISO 3290 Rolling bearings — Balls
  - ISO 3290-1:2014 Part 1: Steel balls
  - ISO 3290-2:2014 Part 2: Ceramic balls
- ISO 3291:2016 Extra-long Morse taper shank twist drills
- ISO 3292:2016 Extra-long parallel shank twist drills
- ISO 3293:2016 Morse taper shank countersinks for angles 60 degrees, 90 degrees and 120 degrees inclusive
- ISO 3294:2016 Parallel shank countersinks for angles 60, 90 and 120 degrees inclusive
- ISO 3295:1975 Narrow bandsaw blades for woodworking — Dimensions
- ISO 3296:1975 Textile machinery and accessories — Tubes for ring-spinning, doubling and twisting spindles, taper 1:64 [Withdrawn: replaced with ISO 368]
- ISO 3297:2020 Information and documentation – International standard serial number (ISSN)
- ISO 3298:1994 Photography — Processing chemicals — Specifications for glacial acetic acid
- ISO 3299:1994 Photography — Processing chemicals — Specifications for 1-phenyl-3-pyrazolidinone

== ISO 3300 – ISO 3649 ==
- ISO 3300:1976 Photography — Processing chemicals — Specifications for anhydrous sodium thiosulfate [Withdrawn: replaced with ISO 10636]
- ISO 3301:1975 Statistical interpretation of data – Comparison of two means in the case of paired observations
- ISO 3302 Rubber — Tolerances for products
  - ISO 3302-1:2014 Part 1: Dimensional tolerances
  - ISO 3302-2:2008 Part 2: Geometrical tolerances
- ISO 3303 Rubber- or plastics-coated fabrics — Determination of bursting strength
  - ISO 3303-1 Part 1: Steel-ball method
  - ISO 3303-2 Part 2: Hydraulic method
- ISO 3304:1985 Plain end seamless precision steel tubes — Technical conditions for delivery [Withdrawn without replacement]
- ISO 3305:1985 Plain end welded precision steel tubes — Technical conditions for delivery [Withdrawn without replacement]
- ISO 3306:1985 Plain end as-welded and sized precision steel tubes — Technical conditions for delivery [Withdrawn without replacement]
- ISO 3307:1975 Information interchange – Representations of time of the day [Withdrawn: replaced by ISO 8601:1988]
- ISO 3308:2012 Routine analytical cigarette-smoking machine — Definitions and standard conditions
- ISO/IEC 3309:1993 Information technology — Telecommunications and information exchange between systems — High-level data link control (HDLC) procedures — Frame structure [Withdrawn: replaced by ISO/IEC 13239]
- ISO 3310 sieves — Technical requirements and testing
  - ISO 3310-1:2016 Part 1: Test sieves of metal wire cloth
  - ISO 3310-2:2013 Part 2: Test sieves of perforated metal plate
  - ISO 3310-3:1990 Part 3: Test sieves of electroformed sheets
- ISO/TR 3311:1974 Plain end precision steel tubes, welded and seamless — General tables of dimensions and masses per unit length [Withdrawn: replaced by ISO 4200]
- ISO 3312:1987 Sintered metal materials and hardmetals — Determination of Young modulus
- ISO/TR 3313:2018 Measurement of fluid flow in closed conduits — Guidelines on the effects of flow pulsations on flow-measurement instruments
- ISO 3314:1975 Shell drills with taper bore (taper bore 1 : 30 (included)) with slot drive
- ISO 3315:2018 Assembly tools for screws and nuts — Driving parts for hand-operated square drive socket wrenches — Dimensions and tests
- ISO 3316:2018 Assembly tools for screws and nuts — Attachments for hand-operated square drive socket wrenches — Dimensions and tests
- ISO 3317:2015 Assembly tools for screws and nuts — Square drive adaptor with hexagon or cylindrical flat drive, for power socket wrenches
- ISO 3318:2016 Assembly tools for screws and nuts — Open-ended wrenches, box wrenches and combination wrenches — Maximum widths of heads
- ISO 3319 Guide for the use of ISO 2859 "Sampling procedures and tables for inspection by attributes" [Rejected draft]
- ISO 3320:2013 Fluid power systems and components — Cylinder bores and piston rod diameters and area ratios — Metric series
- ISO 3321:1975 Fluid power systems and components — Cylinder bores and piston rod diameters — Inch series [Withdrawn without replacement]
- ISO 3322:1985 Fluid power systems and components — Cylinders — Nominal pressures [Withdrawn without replacement]
- ISO 3323:1987 Aircraft — Hydraulic components — Marking to indicate fluid for which component is approved
- ISO 3324 Aircraft tyres and rims
  - ISO 3324-1:2013 Part 1: Specifications [Withdrawn without replacement]
  - ISO 3324-2:2013 Part 2: Part 2: Test methods for tyres [Withdrawn without replacement]
- ISO 3325:1996 Sintered metal materials, excluding hardmetals — Determination of transverse rupture strength
- ISO 3326:2013 Hardmetals — Determination of (the magnetization) coercivity [Withdrawn without replacement]
- ISO 3327:2009 Hardmetals — Determination of transverse rupture strength
- ISO 3328:1975 Nitric acid for industrial use — Determination of sulphate content — Method by reduction and titrimetry [Withdrawn without replacement]
- ISO 3329:1975 Ammonium nitrate for industrial use — Determination of content of sulphur compounds — Method by reduction and titrimetry [Withdrawn without replacement]
- ISO 3330:1975 Ammonium nitrate for industrial use — Determination of ammoniacal nitrogen content — Titrimetric method after distillation [Withdrawn without replacement]
- ISO 3331:1975 Ammonium nitrate for industrial use — Determination of total nitrogen content — Titrimetric method after distillation [Withdrawn without replacement]
- ISO 3332:1975 Ammonium sulphate for industrial use — Determination of ammoniacal nitrogen content — Titrimetric method after distillation [Withdrawn without replacement]
- ISO 3333:1975 Ammonium sulphate for industrial use — Determination of copper content — Zinc dibenzyldithiocarbamate photometric method [Withdrawn without replacement]
- ISO 3334:2006 Micrographics — ISO resolution test chart No. 2 — Description and use
- ISO 3335:1977 Extruded solid profiles in aluminium-zinc- magnesium alloy Al Zn4,5 Mg1 (7020) — Chemical composition and mechanical properties [Withdrawn: replaced with ISO 209-1]
- ISO 3336:1993 Dentistry — Synthetic polymer teeth [Withdrawn: replaced with ISO 22112]
- ISO 3337:2000 T-slot cutters with cylindrical shanks and with Morse taper shanks having tapped hole
- ISO 3338 Cylindrical shanks for milling cutters
  - ISO 3338-1:1996 Part 1: Dimensional characteristics of plain cylindrical shanks
  - ISO 3338-2:2013 Part 2: Dimensional characteristics of flatted cylindrical shanks
  - ISO 3338-3:1996 Part 3: Dimensional characteristics of threaded shanks
- ISO 3339 Tractors and machinery for agriculture and forestry — Classification and terminology
  - ISO 3339-0:1986 Part 0: Classification system and classification [Withdrawn without replacement]
- ISO 3340:1976 Fibre building boards — Determination of sand content
- ISO 3341:2000 Textile glass — Yarns — Determination of breaking force and breaking elongation
- ISO 3342:2011 Textile glass — Mats — Determination of tensile breaking force
- ISO 3343:2010 Reinforcement yarns — Determination of twist balance index
- ISO 3344:1997 Reinforcement products — Determination of moisture content
- ISO 3345:1975 Wood — Determination of ultimate tensile stress parallel to grain [Withdrawn: replaced with ISO 13061-6]
- ISO 3346:1975 Wood — Determination of ultimate tensile stress perpendicular to grain [Withdrawn: replaced with ISO 13061-7]
- ISO 3347:1976 Wood — Determination of ultimate shearing stress parallel to grain [Withdrawn: replaced with ISO 13061-8]
- ISO 3348:1975 Wood — Determination of impact bending strength [Withdrawn: replaced with ISO 13061-10]
- ISO 3349:1975 Wood — Determination of modulus of elasticity in static bending [Withdrawn: replaced with ISO 13061-4]
- ISO 3350:1975 Wood — Determination of static hardness [Withdrawn: replaced with ISO 13061-12]
- ISO 3351:1975 Wood — Determination of resistance to impact indentation [Withdrawn: replaced with ISO 13061-11]
- ISO/TR 3352:1974 Acoustics — Assessment of noise with respect to its effect on the intelligibility of speech [Withdrawn without replacement]
- ISO 3353 Aerospace — Lead and runout threads
  - ISO 3353-1:2020 Part 1: Rolled external threads
  - ISO 3353-2:2020 Part 2: Internal threads
- ISO 3354:2008 Measurement of clean water flow in closed conduits – Velocity-area method using current-meters in full conduits and under regular flow conditions
- ISO 3355:1975 Shoe sizes — System of length grading (for use in the Mondopoint system) [Withdrawn: replaced with ISO 9407]
- ISO 3356:2009 Milk — Determination of alkaline phosphatase
- ISO 3357:1975 Sodium tripolyphosphate and sodium pyrophosphate for industrial use — Determination of total phosphorus(V) oxide content — Quinoline phosphomolybdate gravimetric method
- ISO 3358:1979 Sodium tripolyphosphate and sodium pyrophosphate for industrial use — Separation by column chromatography and determination of the different phosphate forms [Withdrawn without replacement]
- ISO 3359:1975 Phosphoric acid for industrial use — Determination of arsenic content — Silver diethyldithiocarbamate photometric method [Withdrawn without replacement]
- ISO 3360:1976 Phosphoric acid and sodium phosphates for industrial use (including foodstuffs) — Determination of fluorine content — Alizarin complexone and lanthanum nitrate photometric method
- ISO 3361:1975 Phosphoric acid for industrial use — Determination of soluble silica content — Reduced molybdosilicate spectrophotometric method [Withdrawn without replacement]
- ISO 3362:1976 Benzyl chloride for industrial use — Methods of test [Withdrawn without replacement]
- ISO 3363:1976 Fluorochlorinated hydrocarbons for industrial use — Determination of acidity — Titrimetric method
- ISO 3364:2017 Indexable hardmetal (carbide) inserts with rounded corners, with cylindrical fixing hole — Dimensions
- ISO 3365:2016 Indexable hardmetal (carbide) inserts with wiper edges, without fixing hole — Dimensions
- ISO 3366:1999 Coated abrasives — Abrasive rolls
- ISO 3367:1975 Coated abrasives — Rolls for widths of 50 mm and greater — Any backing — Designation and dimensions [Withdrawn: replaced with ISO 3366]
- ISO 3368:1975 Coated abrasives — Cloth rolls up to and including 40 mm width — Designation and dimensions [Withdrawn: replaced with ISO 3366]
- ISO 3369:2006 Impermeable sintered metal materials and hardmetals — Determination of density
- ISO 3371:1975 Modular units for machine tool construction — Rotary tables and multi-sided centre bases for rotary tables
- ISO 3372:1975 Shipbuilding — Inland vessels — Mushroom-type ventilator heads [Withdrawn without replacement]
- ISO 3373 Fibre building boards — Determination of paint absorption [Rejected draft]
- ISO 3374:2000 Reinforcement products — Mats and fabrics — Determination of mass per unit area
- ISO 3375:2009 Textile glass — Determination of stiffness of rovings
- ISO 3376:2020 Leather — Physical and mechanical tests — Determination of tensile strength and percentage elongation
- ISO 3377 Leather — Physical and mechanical tests — Determination of tear load
- ISO 3377-1:2011 Part 1: Single edge tear
- ISO 3377-2:2016 Part 2: Double edge tear
- ISO 3378:2002 Leather — Physical and mechanical tests — Determination of resistance to grain cracking and grain crack index
- ISO 3379:2015 Leather — Determination of distension and strength of surface (Ball burst method)
- ISO 3380:2015 Leather — Physical and mechanical tests — Determination of shrinkage temperature up to 100 °C
- ISO 3381:2021 Railway applications – Acoustics – Noise measurement inside railbound vehicles
- ISO 3382 Acoustics — Measurement of room acoustic parameters
  - ISO 3382-1:2009 Acoustics — Measurement of room acoustic parameters — Part 1: Performance spaces
  - ISO 3382-2:2008 Acoustics — Measurement of room acoustic parameters — Part 2: Reverberation time in ordinary rooms
  - ISO 3382-3:2022 Acoustics — Measurement of room acoustic parameters — Part 3: Open plan offices
- ISO 3383:1985 Rubber — General directions for achieving elevated or subnormal temperatures for test purposes [Withdrawn: replaced with ISO 23529]
- ISO 3384 Rubber, vulcanized or thermoplastic — Determination of stress relaxation in compression
  - ISO 3384-1:2019 Part 1: Testing at constant temperature
  - ISO 3384-2:2019 Part 2: Testing with temperature cycling
- ISO 3385:2014 Flexible cellular polymeric materials — Determination of fatigue by constant-load pounding
- ISO 3386 Polymeric materials, cellular flexible — Determination of stress-strain characteristics in compression
  - ISO 3386-1:1986 Part 1: Low-density materials
  - ISO 3386-2:1997 Part 2: High-density materials
- ISO 3387:2020 Rubber — Determination of crystallization effects by hardness measurements
- ISO 3388:1977 Patent documents — Bibliographic references — Essential and complementary elements [Withdrawn: replaced with ISO 690]
- ISO 3389:1975 Aircraft — Radio frequency flexible coaxial cables — Dimensions and electrical characteristics [Withdrawn without replacement]
- ISO 3390:1976 Aluminium oxide primarily used for the production of aluminium — Determination of manganese content — Flame atomic absorption method [Withdrawn without replacement]
- ISO 3391:1976 Cryolite, natural and artificial — Determination of calcium content — Flame atomic absorption method
- ISO 3392:1976 Cryolite, natural and artificial, and aluminium fluoride for industrial use — Determination of water content — Electrometric method [Withdrawn without replacement]
- ISO 3393:1976 Cryolite, natural and artificial, and aluminium fluoride for industrial use — Determination of moisture content — Gravimetric method
- ISO 3394:2012 Packaging – Complete, filled transport packages and unit loads – Dimensions of rigid rectangular packages
- ISO 3395:1975 Rotary drilling equipment — Roller bits and blade drag bits [Withdrawn without replacement]
- ISO 3396:1975 Rotary drilling equipment — Diamond drilling bits and diamond core bits [Withdrawn without replacement]
- ISO 3397:1977 Broadleaved wood raw parquet blocks — General characteristics [Withdrawn: replaced with ISO 4556]
- ISO 3398:1977 Broadleaved wood raw parquet blocks — Classification of oak parquet blocks [Withdrawn: replaced with ISO 4561]
- ISO 3399:1976 Broadleaved wood raw parquet blocks — Classification of beech parquet blocks [Withdrawn: replaced with ISO 4561]
- ISO 3400:1997 Cigarettes — Determination of alkaloids in smoke condensates — Spectrometric method
- ISO 3401:1991 Cigarettes — Determination of alkaloid retention by the filters — Spectrometric method
- ISO 3402:1999 Tobacco and tobacco products — Atmosphere for conditioning and testing
- ISO 3405:2019 Petroleum and related products from natural or synthetic sources — Determination of distillation characteristics at atmospheric pressure
- ISO 3406:1975 Tobacco and tobacco products — Expression of analytical test results [Withdrawn without replacement]
- ISO 3407:1983 Information processing – Information interchange on 3,81 mm (0.150 in) magnetic tape cassette at 4 cpmm (100 cpi), phase encoded at 63 ftpmm (1 600 ftpi) [Withdrawn without replacement]
- ISO 3408 Ball screws
  - ISO 3408-1:2006 Part 1: Vocabulary and designation
  - ISO 3408-2:2021 Part 2: Nominal diameters, leads, nut dimensions and mounting bolts — Metric series
  - ISO 3408-3:2006 Part 3: Acceptance conditions and acceptance tests
  - ISO 3408-4:2006 Part 4: Static axial rigidity
  - ISO 3408-5:2006 Part 5: Static and dynamic axial load ratings and operational life
- ISO 3409:1975 Passenger cars — Lateral spacing of foot controls
- ISO 3410:1989 Agricultural machinery — Endless variable-speed V-belts and groove sections of corresponding pulleys
- ISO 3411:2007 Earth-moving machinery — Physical dimensions of operators and minimum operator space envelope
- ISO 3412:1992 Road vehicles — Screened and waterproof spark-plugs and their connections — Types 1A and 1B
- ISO 3413:1975 Information processing — Recorded magnetic tapes for interchange instrumentation applications — Standard tape speeds and track configurations [Withdrawn: replaced with ISO 6068]
- ISO 3414 Modular coordination — co-ordinating sizes for windows [Rejected draft]
- ISO 3415:1986 Textile floor coverings — Determination of thickness loss after brief, moderate static loading
- ISO 3416:1986 Textile floor coverings — Determination of thickness loss after prolonged, heavy static loading
- ISO 3417:2008 Rubber — Measurement of vulcanization characteristics with the oscillating disc curemeter [Withdrawn: replaced with ISO 6502-2]
- ISO 3418:1975 Steel Tubes — Butt-welding bends, types 3D and 5D (45°, 90°, and 180°), without quality requirements [Withdrawn without replacement]
- ISO 3419:1981 Non-alloy and alloy steel butt-welding fittings
- ISO 3420:1975 Ammonium hydrogen carbonate for industrial use (including foodstuffs) — Determination of ash — Gravimetric method [Withdrawn without replacement]
- ISO 3421:2022 Petroleum and natural gas industries — Drilling and production equipment — Offshore conductor design, setting depth and installation [original draft related to Ammonium hydrogen carbonate for industrial use]
- ISO 3422:1975 Ammonium hydrogen carbonate for industrial use (including foodstuffs) — Determination of total carbon dioxide content — Titrimetric method [Withdrawn without replacement]
- ISO 3423:1975 Sulphuric acid and oleums for industrial use — Determination of sulphur dioxide content — Iodometric method
- ISO 3424:1975 Sodium perborates for industrial use — Determination of bulk density [Withdrawn without replacement]
- ISO 3425:1975 Sulphur for industrial use — Determination of ash at 850-900 degrees C and of residue at 200 degrees C
- ISO 3426:1975 Sulphur for industrial use — Determination of loss in mass at 80 degrees C
- ISO 3427:1976 Gaseous halogenated hydrocarbons (liquefied gases) — Taking of a sample
- ISO 3428:1976 Sodium fluoride for industrial use — Preparation and storage of test samples [Withdrawn without replacement]
- ISO 3429:1976 Sodium fluoride primarily used for the production of aluminium — Determination of iron content — 1,10- Phenanthroline photometric method
- ISO 3430:1976 Sodium fluoride primarily used for the production of aluminium — Determination of silica content — Reduced molybdosilicate spectrophotometric method
- ISO 3431:1976 Sodium fluoride primarily used for the production of aluminium — Determination of soluble sulphates content — Turbidimetric method
- ISO 3432:2008 Cheese — Determination of fat content — Butyrometer for Van Gulik method
- ISO 3433:2008 Cheese — Determination of fat content — Van Gulik method
- ISO 3434:2012 Ships and marine technology — Heated glass panes for ships' rectangular windows
- ISO 3435:1977 Continuous mechanical handling equipment — Classification and symbolization of bulk materials
- ISO 3437:1975 Road vehicles — Determination of fuel leakage in the event of a collision [Withdrawn without replacement]
- ISO 3438:2013 Subland twist drills for holes prior to tapping screw threads (originally Subland twist drills with Morse taper shanks for holes prior to tapping screw threads)
- ISO 3439:2003 Subland twist drills with cylindrical shanks for holes prior to tapping screw threads [Withdrawn: replaced with ISO 3438]
- ISO 3440 Twist drills with indexable inserts made of cemented carbide, with parallel shank, for metal and plastics [Rejected draft]
- ISO 3441 Twist drills with indexable inserts made of cemented carbide, with Morse taper shank, for metal and plastics [Rejected draft]
- ISO 3442 Machine tools — Dimensions and geometric tests for self-centring chucks with two-piece jaws
- ISO 3442-1:2005 Part 1: Manually operated chucks with tongue and groove type jaws
- ISO 3442-2:2005 Part 2: Power-operated chucks with tongue and groove type jaws
- ISO 3442-3:2007 Part 3: Power-operated chucks with serrated jaws
- ISO 3443 Tolerances for building
  - ISO 3443-1:1979 Part 1: Basic principles for evaluation and specification
  - ISO 3443-2:1979 Part 2: Statistical basis for predicting fit between components having a normal distribution of sizes
  - ISO 3443-3:1987 Part 3: Procedures for selecting target size and predicting fit
  - ISO 3443-4:1986 Part 4: Method for predicting deviations of assemblies and for allocation of tolerances
  - ISO 3443-5:1982 Part 5: Series of values to be used for specification of tolerances
  - ISO 3443-6:1986 Part 6: General principles for approval criteria, control of conformity with dimensional tolerance specifications and statistical control — Method 1
  - ISO 3443-7:1988 Part 7: General principles for approval criteria, control of conformity with dimensional tolerance specifications and statistical control — Method 2 (Statistical control method)
  - ISO 3443-8:1989 Part 8: Dimensional inspection and control of construction work
- ISO 3444:2023 Stainless-steel wire ropes [original draft was Paper and board – Determination of abrasion resistance – Taber method]
- ISO/IEC TR 3445:2022 Information technology – Cloud computing – Audit of cloud services [original draft was Modular coordination — Preferred sizes for horizontal controlling dimensions]
- ISO 3446 Timber Structures – Determination of characteristic values of sawn timber from tests on Small Clear Wood Specimens [Under development; original draft was Modular coordination — Preferred sizes for vertical controlling dimensions]
- ISO 3447:1975 Joints in building — General check-list of joint functions
- ISO 3448:1992 Industrial liquid lubricants — ISO viscosity classification
- ISO 3449:2005 Earth-moving machinery — Falling-object protective structures — Laboratory tests and performance requirements
- ISO 3450:2011 Earth-moving machinery — Wheeled or high-speed rubber-tracked machines — Performance requirements and test procedures for brake systems
- ISO 3451 Plastics — Determination of ash
  - ISO 3451-1:2019 Part 1: General methods
  - ISO 3451-2:1998 Part 2: Poly(alkylene terephthalate) materials
  - ISO 3451-3:1984 Part 3: Unplasticized cellulose acetate
  - ISO 3451-4:1998 Part 4: Polyamides
  - ISO 3451-5:2002 Part 5: Poly(vinyl chloride)
- ISO 3452 Non-destructive testing — Penetrant testing
  - ISO 3452-1:2021 Part 1: General principles
  - ISO 3452-2:2021 Part 2: Testing of penetrant materials
  - ISO 3452-3:2013 Part 3: Reference test blocks
  - ISO 3452-4:1998 Part 4: Equipment
  - ISO 3452-5:2008 Part 5: Penetrant testing at temperatures higher than 50 degrees C
  - ISO 3452-6:2008 Part 6: Penetrant testing at temperatures lower than 10 degrees C
- ISO 3453:1984 Non-destructive testing — Liquid penetrant inspection — Means of verification [Withdrawn without replacement]
- ISO 3454:2008 Hydrometry – Direct depth sounding and suspension equipment
- ISO 3455:2021 Hydrometry – Calibration of current-meters in straight open tanks
- ISO 3456:1975 Aircraft — Lever-operated manual switches (Class 3) — Performance requirements
- ISO 3457:2003 Earth-moving machinery — Guards — Definitions and requirements
- ISO 3458:2015 Plastics piping systems — Mechanical joints between fittings and pressure pipes — Test method for leaktightness under internal pressure
- ISO 3459:2015 Plastic piping systems — Mechanical joints between fittings and pressure pipes — Test method for leaktightness under negative pressure
- ISO 3460:1975 Unplasticized polyvinyl chloride (PVC) pressures pipes — Metric series — Dimensions of adapter for backing flange [Withdrawn: replaced with ISO 1452-3]
- ISO 3461 General principles for the creation of graphical symbols
- ISO 3461-1:1988 Part 1: Graphical symbols for use on equipment [Withdrawn: replaced with ISO 80416-1]
- ISO 3461-2:1987 Part 2: Graphical symbols for use in technical product documentation [Withdrawn: replaced with ISO 80416-1]
- ISO 3462:1980 Tractors and machinery for agriculture and forestry — Seat reference point — Method of determination [Withdrawn without replacement]
- ISO 3463:2006 Tractors for agriculture and forestry — Roll-over protective structures (ROPS) — Dynamic test method and acceptance conditions
- ISO 3464:1977 Textile machinery and accessories — Bearings for bottom rollers and allied dimensions — Caps with central nose and caps with side lugs [Withdrawn without replacement]
- ISO 3465:1975 Hand taper pin reamers
- ISO 3466:2016 Machine taper pin reamers with parallel shanks
- ISO 3467:2016 Machine taper pin reamers with Morse taper shanks
- ISO 3468:2014 Passenger cars — Windscreen defrosting and demisting systems — Test method
- ISO 3469:1989 Passenger cars — Windscreen washing systems — Test methods
- ISO 3470:1989 Passenger cars — Windscreen demisting systems — Test method [Withdrawn: replaced with ISO 3468]
- ISO 3471:2008 Earth-moving machinery — Roll-over protective structures — Laboratory tests and performance requirements
- ISO 3472:1975 Unplasticized polyvinyl chloride (PVC) pipes — Specification and determination of resistance to acetone [Withdrawn without replacement]
- ISO 3473:1977 Unplasticized polyvinyl chloride (PVC) pipes — Effect of sulphuric acid — Requirement and test method [Withdrawn without replacement]
- ISO 3474:1976 Unplasticized polyvinyl chloride (PVC) pipes — Specification and measurement of opacity [Withdrawn without replacement]
- ISO 3475:2020 Essential oil of aniseed (Pimpinella anisum L.)
- ISO 3476:1975 Modular units for machine tool construction — Tenon drive and flanges for mounting multi- spindle heads
- ISO 3477:1981 Polypropylene (PP) pipes and fittings — Density — Determination and specification [Withdrawn without replacement]
- ISO 3478:1975 Polypropylene (PP) pipes — Determination of longitudinal reversion [Withdrawn: replaced with ISO 2505-(1-2)]
- ISO 3480:1976 Polypropylene (PP) pipes — Maximum permissible longitudinal reversion [Withdrawn without replacement]
- ISO 3481 Acoustics — measurement of noise emitted by pneumatric tools and machines [Rejected draft]
- ISO 3482:2022 Marine technology — Technical guidelines for the active source exploration with Ocean Bottom Seismometers (OBS) [original draft with this number unknown]
- ISO 3483:2023 Copper and zinc sulfide concentrates — Determination of thallium — Acid digestion and inductively coupled plasma — mass spectrometry [original draft with this number unknown]
- ISO/TR 3485:1980 Plastics — Polypropylene granules — Determination of thermal stability in air by pH method [Withdrawn without replacement]
- ISO 3486:1980 Wrought copper and copper alloys — Cold-rolled flat products delivered in straight lengths (sheet) — Dimensions and tolerances [Withdrawn without replacement]
- ISO 3487:1980 Wrought copper and copper alloys — Cold-rolled flat products in coils or on reels (strip) — Dimensions and tolerances [Withdrawn without replacement]
- ISO 3488:1982 Wrought copper and copper alloys — Extruded round, square or hexagonal bars — Dimensions and tolerances [Withdrawn without replacement]
- ISO 3489:1984 Wrought copper and copper alloys — Drawn round bars — All minus tolerances on diameter and form tolerances [Withdrawn without replacement]
- ISO 3490:1984 Wrought copper and copper alloys — Drawn hexagonal bars — All minus tolerances on width across flats and form tolerances [Withdrawn without replacement]
- ISO 3491:1984 Wrought copper and copper alloys — Drawn square bars — All minus tolerances on width across flats and form tolerances [Withdrawn without replacement]
- ISO 3492:1982 Wrought copper and copper alloys — Drawn round wire — Tolerances on diameter [Withdrawn without replacement]
- ISO 3493:2014 Vanilla – Vocabulary
- ISO 3494:1976 Statistical interpretation of data – Power of tests relating to means and variances
- ISO 3495:1975 Dried milk — Determination of lactic acid and lactates content [Withdrawn: replaced with ISO 8069]
- ISO 3496:1994 Meat and meat products — Determination of hydroxyproline content
- ISO 3497:2000 Metallic coatings — Measurement of coating thickness — X-ray spectrometric methods
- ISO 3498:1979 Lubricants for machine tools — Classification [Withdrawn without replacement]
- ISO 3499:1976 Plastics — Aqueous dispersions of homopolymers and copolymers of vinyl acetate — Determination of bromine number [Withdrawn without replacement]
- ISO 3500:2005 Gas cylinders — Seamless steel CO_{2} cylinders for fixed fire-fighting installations on ships
- ISO 3501:2021 Plastics piping systems — Mechanical joints between fittings and pressure pipes — Test method for resistance to pull-out under constant longitudinal force
- ISO 3502 Mining – Building a reference architecture to support the evaluation of automation and autonomy solutions [Under development; original draft related to Plastics piping systems]
- ISO 3503:2015 Plastics piping systems — Mechanical joints between fittings and pressure pipes — Test method for leaktightness under internal pressure of assemblies subjected to bending
- ISO 3505:1975 Ropes and cordage — Equivalence between natural fibre ropes and man-made fibre ropes for use in the mooring of vessels
- ISO 3506 Mechanical properties of corrosion-resistant stainless steel fasteners
  - ISO 3506-1:2020 Part 1: Bolts, screws and studs with specified grades and property classes
  - ISO 3506-2:2020 Part 2: Nuts with specified grades and property classes
  - ISO 3506-3:2009 Part 3: Set screws and similar fasteners not under tensile stress
  - ISO 3506-4:2009 Part 4: Tapping screws
  - ISO 3506-5:2022 Part 5: Special fasteners (also including fasteners from nickel alloys) for high temperature applications
  - ISO 3506-6:2020 Part 6: General rules for the selection of stainless steels and nickel alloys for fasteners
- ISO 3507:1999 Laboratory glassware – Pyknometers
- ISO 3508:1976 Thread run-outs for fasteners with thread in accordance with ISO 261 and ISO 262
- ISO 3509:2005 Coffee and coffee products – Vocabulary
- ISO/TR 3510 Advanced automated mining systems – Communication interface for interoperability between a supervisor system and heterogenous autonomous machine controllers [Under development; original draft with this nunber unknown]
- ISO 3511 Industrial process measurement control functions and instrumentation – Symbolic representation (Note: The exact wording of this title varies between parts. This is the wording of the most recently published part.)
  - ISO 3511-1:1977 Part 1: Basic requirements [Withdrawn: replaced with ISO 14617-2:2025]
  - ISO 3511-2:1984 Part 2: Extension of basic requirements [Withdrawn: replaced with ISO 14617-2:2025]
  - ISO 3511-3:1984 Part 3: Detailed symbols for instrument interconnection diagrams [Withdrawn: replaced with ISO 14617-2:2025]
  - ISO 3511-4:1985 Part 4: Basic symbols for process computer, interface, and shared display/control functions [Withdrawn: replaced with ISO 14617-2:2025]
- ISO 3512:1992 Heavy-duty cranked-link transmission chains
- ISO 3513:1995 Chillies — Determination of Scoville index
- ISO 3514:1976 Chlorinated polyvinyl chloride (CPVC) pipes and fittings — Specification and determination of density
- ISO 3515:2002 Oil of lavender (Lavandula angustifolia Mill.)
- ISO 3516:1997 Oil of coriander fruits (Coriandrum sativum L.)
- ISO 3517:2012 Essential oil of neroli (Citrus aurantium L., syn. Citrus amara Link, syn. Citrus bigaradia Loisel, syn. Citrus vulgaris Risso)
- ISO 3518:2002 Oil of sandalwood (Santalum album L.)
- ISO 3519:2005 Oil of lime distilled, Mexican type (Citrus aurantifolia (Christm.) Swingle)
- ISO 3520:2022 Oil of bergamot [Citrus aurantium L. subsp. bergamia (Wight et Arnott) Engler], Italian type
- ISO 3521:1997 Plastics — Unsaturated polyester and epoxy resins — Determination of overall volume shrinkage
- ISO 3522:2007 Aluminium and aluminium alloys — Castings — Chemical composition and mechanical properties
- ISO 3523:2002 Oil of cananga (Cananga odorata (Lam.) Hook. f. et Thomson, forma macrophylla)
- ISO 3524:2003 Oil of cinnamon leaf, Sri Lanka type (Cinnamomum zeylanicum Blume)
- ISO 3525:2008 Oil of amyris (Amyris balsamifera L.)
- ISO 3526:2005 Oil of sage, Spanish (Salvia lavandulifolia Vahl)
- ISO 3527:2016 Essential oil of parsley fruits (Petroselinum sativum Hoffm.)
- ISO 3528:2012 Essential oil of mandarin, Italian type (Citrus reticulata Blanco)
- ISO 3529 Vacuum technology – Vocabulary
  - ISO 3529-1:2019 Part 1: General terms
  - ISO 3529-2:2020 Part 2: Vacuum pumps and related terms
  - ISO 3529-3:2024 Part 3: Total and partial pressure vacuum gauges
- ISO 3530:1979 Vacuum technology — Mass-spectrometer-type leak-detector calibration
- ISO 3531 Financial services — Financial information eXchange session layer [Original draft with this number unknown]
  - ISO 3531-1:2022 Part 1: FIX tagvalue encoding
  - ISO 3531-2:2022 Part 2: FIX session layer
  - ISO 3531-3:2022 Part 3: FIX session layer test cases
- ISO 3532 Information technology — 3D Printing and scanning — Medical image-based modelling [Original draft with this number unknown]
  - ISO 3532-1:2023 Part 1: General requirement
  - ISO 3532-2:2024 Part 2: Segmentation
- ISO 3533:2021 Sex toys — Design and safety requirements for products in direct contact with genitalia, the anus, or both
- ISO 3534 Statistics – Vocabulary and symbols
  - ISO 3534-1:2006 Part 1: General statistical terms and terms used in probability
  - ISO 3534-2:2006 Part 2: Applied statistics
  - ISO 3534-3:2013 Part 3: Design of experiments
  - ISO 3534-4:2014 Part 4: Survey sampling
- ISO 3535:1977 Forms design sheet and layout chart [Withdrawn without replacement]
- ISO 3536:2016 Road vehicles – Safety glazing materials – Vocabulary
- ISO 3537:2015 Road vehicles – Safety glazing materials – Mechanical tests
- ISO 3538:1997 Road vehicles – Safety glazing materials – Test methods for optical properties
- ISO 3539:1975 Road vehicles — Injection nozzle holder with body, types 8 and 10, and injection nozzle holder with fixing flats, types 9 and 11
- ISO 3540:1976 Paper or plastic printing ribbons – Characteristics of cores
- ISO 3541:1985 Earth-moving machinery — Dimensions of fuel filler opening [Withdrawn without replacement]
- ISO 3542:1975 Earth-moving machinery — Lubrication intervals [Withdrawn: replaced with ISO 6750]
- ISO 3543:2000 Metallic and non-metallic coatings — Measurement of thickness — Beta backscatter method
- ISO 3544:1978 Atomizing oil burners of the monobloc type — Safety times and safety control and monitoring devices [Withdrawn without replacement]
- ISO 3545 Steel tubes and fittings — Symbols for use in specifications
  - ISO 3545-1:1989 Part 1: Tubes and tubular accessories with circular cross-section
  - ISO 3545-2:1989 Part 2: Square and rectangular hollow sections
  - ISO 3545-3:1989 Part 3: Tubular fittings with circular cross-section [Withdrawn without replacement]
- ISO 3546:1976 Fibre building boards — Determination of surface finish (roughness) [Withdrawn without replacement]
- ISO 3547 Plain bearings — Wrapped bushes
  - ISO 3547-1:2018 Part 1: Dimensions
  - ISO 3547-2:2017 Part 2: Test data for outside and inside diameters
  - ISO 3547-3:2017 Part 3: Lubrication holes, grooves and indentations
  - ISO 3547-4:2017 Part 4: Materials
  - ISO 3547-5:2020 Part 5: Checking the outside diameter
  - ISO 3547-6:2020 Part 6: Checking the inside diameter
  - ISO 3547-7:2020 Part 7: Measurement of wall thickness of thin-walled bushes
- ISO 3548 Plain bearings — Thin-walled half bearings with or without flange
  - ISO 3548-1:2022 Part 1: Tolerances, design features and methods of test
  - ISO 3548-2:2020 Part 2: Measurement of wall thickness and flange thickness
  - ISO 3548-3:2012 Part 3: Measurement of peripheral length
- ISO 3549:1995 Zinc dust pigments for paints — Specifications and test methods
- ISO 3550 Cigarettes — Determination of loss of tobacco from the ends
  - ISO 3550-1:1997 Part 1: Method using a rotating cylindrical cage
  - ISO 3550-2:1997 Part 2: Method using a rotating cubic box (sismelatophore)
- ISO 3551 Rotary core diamond drilling equipment — System A
  - ISO 3551-1:1992 Part 1: Metric units
  - ISO 3551-2:1992 Part 2: Inch units
- ISO 3552 Rotary core diamond drilling equipment — System B
  - ISO 3552-1:1992 Part 1: Metric units
  - ISO 3552-2:1992 Part 2: Inch units
- ISO 3553 Road vehicles — High-tension connections for ignition coils and distributors
  - ISO 3553-1:1987 Part 1: Socket-type
  - ISO 3553-2:1997 Part 2: Plug-types
- ISO 3554:1976 Credit cards — Magnetic stripe encoding for tracks 1 and 2 [Withdrawn: replaced with ISO 7810, ISO 7811-(1-5), and ISO/IEC 7813]
- ISO 3555:1977 Centrifugal, mixed flow and axial pumps — Code for acceptance tests — Class B [Withdrawn: replaced with ISO 9906]
- ISO 3556 Sputter-ion pumps — Measurement of performance characteristics [Rejected draft]
- ISO 3557 Plastics — Recommended Practice for Spectrophotometry and Calculation of Colour in CIE Systems [Rejected draft]
- ISO 3558 Plastics — Assessment of the Color of Near White or Near Colorless Materials [Rejected draft]
- ISO 3559:1976 Road vehicles — Working voltages for lights fitted to motor vehicles and to their trailers [Withdrawn without replacement]
- ISO 3560:2013 Road vehicles — Frontal fixed barrier or pole impact test procedure
- ISO 3561:1976 Information processing – Interchangeable magnetic six-disk pack – Track format [Withdrawn without replacement]
- ISO 3562:1976 Information processing – Interchangeable magnetic single-disk cartridge (top loaded) – Physical and magnetic characteristics [Withdrawn without replacement]
- ISO 3563:1976 Information processing – Interchangeable magnetic single-disk cartridge (top loaded) – Track format [Withdrawn without replacement]
- ISO 3564:1976 Information processing – Interchangeable magnetic eleven-disk pack – Physical and magnetic characteristics [Withdrawn without replacement]
- ISO 3565:1975 Meat and meat products — Detection of salmonellae (Reference method) [Withdrawn without replacement]
- ISO 3566:1976 Sodium fluoride primarily used for the production of aluminium — Determination of chlorides content — Turbidimetric method
- ISO 3567:2011 Vacuum gauges — Calibration by direct comparison with a reference gauge
- ISO 3568 Ionization vacuum gauges — Calibration by direct comparison with a reference gauge [Rejected draft]
- ISO 3569:1976 Continuous mechanical handling equipment — Classification of unit loads [Withdrawn without replacement]
- ISO 3570 Vacuum gauges — Standard methods for calibration [Rejected draft]
- ISO 3571 Passenger lift installations
  - ISO 3571-1:1977 Part 1: Residential buildings – Definitions, functional dimensions, and modular co-ordination dimensions [Withdrawn: replaced by ISO 4190-1, in 2019 replaced by ISO 8100-30]
- ISO 3572:1976 Textiles – Weaves – Definitions of general terms and basic weaves
- ISO 3573:2012 Hot-rolled carbon steel sheet of commercial and drawing qualities
- ISO 3574:2012 Cold-reduced carbon steel sheet of commercial and drawing qualities
- ISO 3575:2016 Continuous hot-dip zinc-coated and zinc-iron alloy-coated carbon steel sheet of commercial and drawing qualities
- ISO 3576:1976 Hot-rolled carbon steel sheet coils for the production of cold-reduced products [Withdrawn without replacement]
- ISO 3577:1988 Animal fats — Determination of Bömer value [Withdrawn without replacement]
- ISO 3578:1980 Steel wire ropes — Standard designations [Withdrawn without replacement]
- ISO 3579 Technical Standard for Installation of Structural Modules in Nuclear Power Plants [rejected draft; original was Green coffee beans — Determination of mass of foreign matter which was incorporated into ISO 4149]
- ISO 3580:2017 Welding consumables — Covered electrodes for manual metal arc welding of creep-resisting steels — Classification
- ISO 3581:2016 Welding consumables — Covered electrodes for manual metal arc welding of stainless and heat-resisting steels — Classification
- ISO 3582:2000 Flexible cellular polymeric materials — Laboratory assessment of horizontal burning characteristics of small specimens subjected to a small flame
- ISO 3583:1984 Road vehicles — Pressure test connection for compressed-air pneumatic braking equipment
- ISO 3584:2020 Road vehicles — Clevis couplings — Interchangeability
- ISO 3585:1998 Borosilicate glass 3.3 — Properties
- ISO 3586:1976 Glass plant, pipeline and fittings — General rules for testing, handling and use [Withdrawn without replacement]
- ISO 3587:1976 Glass plant, pipeline and fittings — Pipeline and fittings of nominal bore 15 to 150 mm — Compatibility and interchangeability [Withdrawn without replacement]
- ISO 3588:1977 Spices and condiments — Determination of degree of fineness of grinding — Hand sieving method (Reference method)
- ISO 3589:1975 Modular units for machine tool construction — Integral way columns
- ISO 3590:1976 Modular units for machine tool construction — Spindle units
- ISO 3591:1977 Sensory analysis – Apparatus – Wine-tasting glass
- ISO 3592:2000 Industrial automation systems — Numerical control of machines — NC processor output — File structure and language format
- ISO 3593:1981 Starch — Determination of ash
- ISO 3594:1976 Milk fat — Detection of vegetable fat by gas-liquid chromatography of sterols (Reference method) [Withdrawn without replacement]
- ISO 3595:1976 Milk fat — Detection of vegetable fat by the phytosteryl acetate test
- ISO 3596:2000 Animal and vegetable fats and oils — Determination of unsaponifiable matter — Method using diethyl ether extraction
- ISO 3597 Textile-glass-reinforced plastics — Determination of mechanical properties on rods made of roving-reinforced resin
  - ISO 3597-1:2003 Part 1: General considerations and preparation of rods
  - ISO 3597-2:2003 Part 2: Determination of flexural strength
  - ISO 3597-3:2003 Part 3: Determination of compressive strength
  - ISO 3597-4:2003 Part 4: Determination of apparent interlaminar shear strength
- ISO 3598:2011 Textile glass — Yarns — Basis for a specification
- ISO 3599:1976 Vernier callipers reading to 0,1 and 0,05 mm [Withdrawn without replacement]
- ISO 3600:2015 Tractors, machinery for agriculture and forestry, powered lawn and garden equipment — Operator's manuals — Content and format
- ISO 3601 Fluid power systems – O-rings
  - ISO 3601-1:2012 Inside diameters, cross-sections, tolerances and designation codes
  - ISO 3601-2:2016 Housing dimensions for general applications
  - ISO 3601-3:2005 Quality acceptance criteria
  - ISO 3601-4:2008 Anti-extrusion rings (back-up rings)
  - ISO 3601-5:2015 Suitability of elastomeric materials for industrial applications
- ISO 3602:1989 Documentation – Romanization of Japanese (kana script)
- ISO 3603:1977 Fittings for unplasticized polyvinyl chloride (PVC) pressure pipes with elastic sealing ring type joints — Pressure test for leakproofness
- ISO 3604:1976 Fittings for unplasticized polyvinyl chloride (PVC) pressure pipes with elastic sealing ring type joints — Pressure test for leakproofness under conditions of external hydraulic pressure [Withdrawn without replacement]
- ISO 3605:1987 Textile glass — Rovings — Determination of compressive strength of rod composites [Withdrawn: replaced with ISO 3597-3]
- ISO 3606:1976 Unplasticized polyvinyl chloride (PVC) pipes — Tolerances on outside diameters and wall thicknesses [Withdrawn: replaced with ISO 11922-(1-2)]
- ISO 3607:1977 Polyethylene (PE) pipes — Tolerances on outside diameters and wall thicknesses [Withdrawn: replaced with ISO 11922-(1-2)]
- ISO 3608:1976 Chlorinated polyvinyl chloride (CPVC) pipes — Tolerances on outside diameters and wall thicknesses [Withdrawn: replaced with ISO 11922-(1-2)]
- ISO 3609:1977 Polypropylene (PP) pipes — Tolerances on outside diameters and wall thicknesses [Withdrawn: replaced with ISO 11922-(1-2)]
- ISO 3610:1976 Modular units for machine tool construction — Support brackets
- ISO 3611:2010 Geometrical product specifications (GPS) – Dimensional measuring equipment: Micrometers for external measurements – Design and metrological characteristics
- ISO 3612:1977 Tobacco and tobacco products — Cigarettes — Determination of rate of free combustion [Withdrawn without replacement]
- ISO 3613:2021 Metallic and other inorganic coatings — Chromate conversion coatings on zinc, cadmium, aluminium-zinc alloys and zinc-aluminium alloys — Test methods
- ISO 3614:1975 Shipbuilding — Inland vessels — Detachable ladders [Withdrawn without replacement]
- ISO 3615:1976 Magnetic tape for instrumentation applications — Standardization of analogue modes of recording [Withdrawn: replaced with ISO 6068]
- ISO 3616:2001 Textile glass — Chopped-strand and continuous-filament mats — Determination of average thickness, thickness under load and recovery after compression
- ISO 3617:1994 Photography — Processing chemicals — Specifications for sodium hydroxide
- ISO 3618:1994 Photography — Processing chemicals — Specifications for benzotriazole
- ISO 3619:1994 Photography — Processing chemicals — Specifications for ammonium thiosulfate solution
- ISO 3620:1994 Photography — Processing chemicals — Specifications for aluminium potassium sulfate
- ISO 3621:1994 Photography — Processing chemicals — Specifications for sodium tetraborate decahydrate
- ISO 3622:1996 Photography — Processing chemicals — Specifications for ammonium thiocyanate
- ISO 3623:1994 Photography — Processing chemicals — Specifications for anhydrous potassium carbonate
- ISO 3624:1994 Photography — Processing chemicals — Specifications for potassium ferricyanide
- ISO 3625:1994 Photography — Processing chemicals — Specifications for potassium hydroxide
- ISO 3626:1996 Photography — Processing chemicals — Specifications for potassium thiocyanate
- ISO 3627:2001 Photography — Processing chemicals — Specifications for anhydrous sodium metabisulfite
- ISO 3628:1994 Photography — Processing chemicals — Specifications for boric acid, granular
- ISO 3629:2000 Photography — Processing chemicals — Specifications for potassium metabisulfite
- ISO 3630 Dentistry — Endodontic instruments
  - ISO 3630-1:2019 Part 1: General requirements
  - ISO 3630-2:2013 Part 2: Enlargers
  - ISO 3630-3:2021 Part 3: Compactors
  - ISO 3630-4:2009 Part 4: Auxiliary instruments
  - ISO 3630-5:2020 Part 5: Shaping and cleaning instruments
  - ISO 3630-6:2023 Part 6: Numeric coding system
  - ISO 3630-7 Part 7: Ultrasonic inserts [Under development]
- ISO 3631:2019 Citrus fruits — Guidelines for storage
- ISO 3632 Spices – Saffron (Crocus sativus L.)
  - ISO 3632-1:2011 Part 1: Specification
  - ISO 3632-2:2010 Part 2: Test methods
- ISO 3633:2002 Plastics piping systems for soil and waste discharge (low and high temperature) inside buildings — Unplasticized poly(vinyl chloride) (PVC-U)
- ISO 3634:1979 Vegetable products — Determination of chloride content
- ISO 3635:1981 Size designation of clothes – Definitions and body measurement procedure [Withdrawn: replaced with ISO 8559-1]
- ISO 3636:1977 Size designation of clothes — Men's and boys' outerwear garments [Withdrawn: replaced with ISO 8559-2]
- ISO 3637:1977 Size designation of clothes — Women's and girls' outerwear garments [Withdrawn: replaced with ISO 8559-2]
- ISO 3638:1977 Size designation of clothes — Infants' garments [Withdrawn: replaced with ISO 8559-2]
- ISO 3639:1981 Cinematography — Projection reels/spools 75 to 312 mm diameter for 8 mm Type S motion-picture film — Dimensions and specifications
- ISO 3640:1982 Cinematography — Motion-picture prints and sound records for international exchange of television programmes — Specifications [Withdrawn without replacement]
- ISO 3641:1976 Cinematography — Motion-picture camera cartridge, 8 mm Type S Model II — Cartridge fit and take-up core drive — Dimensions and specifications
- ISO 3642:1983 Cinematography — Cemented or welded splices on 8 mm Type S motion-picture film for projector use — Dimensions
- ISO 3643:2024 Rolling bearings — Ceramic rolling elements — Terms and characteristics of surface imperfections [Original draft was Cinematography — Image area produced by 8 mm Type S Model II motion-picture camera aperture and maximum projectable image area — Positions and dimensions]
- ISO 3644:1976 Cinematography — Spindles for 8 mm Type R motion-picture cameras and projectors — Dimensions
- ISO 3645:1984 Cinematography — Image area produced by 8 mm Type S motion-picture camera aperture and maximum projectable image area — Positions and dimensions
- ISO 3646:1976 Cinematography — Motion-picture camera cartridge, 8 mm Type S Model II — Slots, projections and cartridge hole for indicating film speed, colour balance and film identification — Dimensions and positions
- ISO 3647:1976 Cinematography — Spindles for 16 mm motion-picture camera spools and projector reels — Dimensions
- ISO 3648:1994 Aviation fuels — Estimation of net specific energy
- ISO 3649:1980 Cleaning equipment for air or other gases — Vocabulary [Withdrawn: replaced with ISO 29464]

== ISO 3650 – ISO 3999 ==
- ISO 3650:1998 Geometrical Product Specifications (GPS) – Length standards – Gauge blocks
- ISO 3651 Determination of resistance to intergranular corrosion of stainless steels
  - ISO 3651-1:1998 Austenitic and ferritic-austenitic (duplex) stainless steels — Corrosion test in nitric acid medium by measurement of loss in mass (Huey test)
  - ISO 3651-2:1998 Ferritic, austenitic and ferritic-austenitic (duplex) stainless steels — Corrosion test in media containing sulfuric acid
  - ISO 3651-3:2017 Determination of resistance to intergranular corrosion of stainless steels — Part 3: Corrosion test for low-Cr ferritic stainless steels
- ISO 3652:1975 Shipbuilding — Inland vessels — Rope reels [Withdrawn without replacement]
- ISO 3653:1978 Cinematography — Spindles for 8 mm Type S motion-picture projector reels/spools — Dimensions
- ISO 3654:1983 Cinematography — Motion-picture camera cartridge, 8-mm Type S, Model I — Cartridge-camera interface and take-up core drive — Dimensions and specifications [Withdrawn without replacement]
- ISO 3655:1986 Acceptance conditions for vertical turning and boring lathes with one or two columns and a single fixed or movable table — General introduction and testing of the accuracy
- ISO 3656:2011 Animal and vegetable fats and oils — Determination of ultraviolet absorbance expressed as specific UV extinction
- ISO 3657:2020 Animal and vegetable fats and oils — Determination of saponification value
- ISO 3658 Crude or liquid petroleum products — Determination of density and relative density — Graduated bicapillary pyknometer method [Draft merged into ISO 3838]
- ISO 3659:1977 Fruits and vegetables — Ripening after cold storage
- ISO 3660:1976 Fishing nets – Mounting and joining of netting – Terms and illustrations
- ISO 3661:1977 End-suction centrifugal pumps — Baseplate and installation dimensions
- ISO 3662:1976 Hydraulic fluid power — Pumps and motors — Geometric displacements
- ISO 3663:1976 Polyethylene (PE) pressure pipes and fittings, metric series — Dimensions of flanges
- ISO 3664:2009 Graphic technology and photography — Viewing conditions
- ISO 3665:2011 Photography — Intra-oral dental radiographic film and film packets — Manufacturer specifications
- ISO/TR 3666:1998 Viscosity of water
- ISO 3667 Aircraft — Dimensions of hermetically sealed contactors [Rejected draft]
- ISO 3668:2017 Paints and varnishes — Visual comparison of colour of paints
- ISO 3669:2020 Vacuum technology — Dimensions of knife-edge flanges
- ISO 3670:1979 Blanks for plug gauges and handles (taper lock and trilock) and ring gauges — Design and general dimensions [Withdrawn without replacement]
- ISO 3671:1976 Plastics — Aminoplastic moulding materials — Determination of volatile matter
- ISO 3672 Plastics — Unsaturated-polyester resins (UP-R)
  - ISO 3672-1:2000 Part 1: Designation system
  - ISO 3672-2:2000 Part 2: Preparation of test specimens and determination of properties
- ISO 3673 Plastics — Epoxy resins
  - ISO 3673-1:1996 Part 1: Designation
  - ISO 3673-2:2012 Part 2: Preparation of test specimens and determination of properties of crosslinked epoxy resins
- ISO 3674:1976 Shipbuilding — Inland vessels — Deck rail [Withdrawn without replacement]
- ISO 3675:1998 Crude petroleum and liquid petroleum products — Laboratory determination of density — Hydrometer method
- ISO 3676:2012 Packaging – Complete, filled transport packages and unit loads – Unit load dimensions
- ISO 3677:2016 Filler metal for soldering and brazing — Designation
- ISO 3678:1976 Paints and varnishes — Print-free test [Withdrawn: replaced with ISO 9117-6]
- ISO 3679:2015 Determination of flash no-flash and flash point — Rapid equilibrium closed cup method
- ISO 3680:2004 Determination of flash/no flash — Rapid equilibrium closed cup method [Withdrawn: replaced with ISO 3679]
- ISO 3681:2018 Binders for paints and varnishes — Determination of saponification value — Titrimetric method
- ISO 3682:1996 Binders for paints and varnishes — Determination of acid value — Titrimetric method [Withdrawn: replaced with ISO 2114]
- ISO 3683:1978 Soft soldered joints — Determination of shear strength [Withdrawn: replaced with ISO 5187]
- ISO 3684:1990 Conveyor belts — Determination of minimum pulley diameters
- ISO 3685:1993 Tool-life testing with single-point turning tools
- ISO 3686: Test conditions for high accuracy turret and single spindle coordinate drilling and boring machines with table of fixed height with vertical spindle — Testing of the accuracy
  - ISO 3686-1:2000 Part 1: Single column type machines
  - ISO 3686-2:2000 Part 2: Portal type machines with moving table
- ISO 3687:1976 Paper and board — Determination of air resistance (Gurley) [Withdrawn without replacement]
- ISO 3688:1999 Pulps — Preparation of laboratory sheets for the measurement of diffuse blue reflectance factor (ISO brightness)
- ISO 3689:1983 Paper and board — Determination of bursting strength after immersion in water
- ISO 3690:2018 Welding and allied processes — Determination of hydrogen content in arc weld metal
- ISO 3691 Industrial trucks — Safety requirements and verification
  - ISO 3691-1:2011 Part 1: Self-propelled industrial trucks, other than driverless trucks, variable-reach trucks and burden-carrier trucks
  - ISO 3691-2:2016 Part 2: Self-propelled variable-reach trucks
  - ISO 3691-3:2016 Part 3: Additional requirements for trucks with elevating operator position and trucks specifically designed to travel with elevated loads
  - ISO 3691-4:2020 Part 4: Driverless industrial trucks and their systems
  - ISO 3691-5:2014 Part 5: Pedestrian-propelled trucks
  - ISO 3691-6:2021 Part 6: Burden and personnel carriers
  - ISO/TS 3691-7:2011 Part 7: Regional requirements for countries within the European Community [Withdrawn without replacement]
- ISO 3692:1976 Information processing – Reels and cores for 25,4 mm (1 in) perforated paper tape for information interchange – Dimensions [Withdrawn without replacement]
- ISO 3693:1977 Nitric acid for industrial use — Determination of chloride ions content — Potentiometric method [Withdrawn without replacement]
- ISO 3694:1977 Ammonium sulphate for industrial use — Determination of chloride ions content — Potentiometric method [Withdrawn without replacement]
- ISO 3695:1977 Ammonium nitrate for industrial use — Determination of chloride ions content — Potentiometric method [Withdrawn without replacement]
- ISO 3696:1987 Water for analytical laboratory use — Specification and test methods
- ISO 3697:1976 Sodium hydroxide for industrial use — Determination of calcium and magnesium contents — Flame atomic absorption method [Withdrawn without replacement]
- ISO 3698:1976 Potassium hydroxide for industrial use — Determination of calcium and magnesium contents — Flame atomic absorption method [Withdrawn without replacement]
- ISO 3699:1976 Anhydrous hydrogen fluoride for industrial use — Determination of water content — Karl Fischer method
- ISO 3700:1980 Anhydrous hydrogen fluoride for industrial use — Determination of water content — Conductimetric method [Withdrawn without replacement]
- ISO 3701:1976 Anhydrous hydrogen fluoride for industrial use — Determination of hexafluorosilicic acid content — Reduced molybdosilicate photometric method [Withdrawn without replacement]
- ISO 3702:1976 Anhydrous hydrogen fluoride for industrial use — Determination of sulphur dioxide content — Iodometric method [Withdrawn without replacement]
- ISO 3703:1993 Acid-grade and ceramic-grade fluorspar — Determination of flotation agents [Withdrawn without replacement]
- ISO 3704:1976 Sulphur for industrial use — Determination of acidity — Titrimetric method
- ISO 3705:1976 Sulphur for industrial use — Determination of arsenic content — Silver diethyldithiocarbamate photometric method
- ISO 3706:1976 Phosphoric acid for industrial use (including foodstuffs) — Determination of total phosphorus (V) oxide content — Quinoline phosphomolybdate gravimetric method
- ISO 3707:1976 Phosphoric acid for industrial use (including foodstuffs) — Determination of calcium content — Flame atomic absorption method [Withdrawn without replacement]
- ISO 3708:1976 Phosphoric acid for industrial use (including foodstuffs) — Determination of chloride content — Potentiometric method [Withdrawn without replacement]
- ISO 3709:1976 Phosphoric acid for industrial use (including foodstuffs) — Determination of oxides of nitrogen content — 3,4- Xylenol spectrophotometric method [Withdrawn without replacement]
- ISO 3710:1990 Lead chrome green pigments — Specifications and methods of test [Withdrawn without replacement]
- ISO 3711:1990 Lead chromate pigments and lead chromate-molybdate pigments — Specifications and methods of test
- ISO 3713:1987 Ferroalloys – Sampling and preparation of samples – General rules
- ISO 3714:1980 Oil of pennyroyal [Withdrawn without replacement]
- ISO 3715 Ships and marine technology – Propulsion plants for ships
  - ISO 3715-1:2002 Part 1: Vocabulary for geometry of propellers
  - ISO 3715-2:2001 Part 2: Vocabulary for controllable-pitch propeller plants
- ISO 3716:2021 Hydrometry – Functional requirements and characteristics of suspended-sediment samplers
- ISO/TR 3717:1975 Textile glass — Mats and woven fabrics — Determination of wet-out time through resin [Withdrawn without replacement]
- ISO/TR 3718:1975 Textile glass — Determination of wet-through time through resin [Withdrawn without replacement]
- ISO 3719:1994 Mechanical vibration — Symbols for balancing machines and associated instrumentation [Withdrawn without replacement]
- ISO 3720:2011 Black tea — Definition and basic requirements
- ISO 3721:2023 Information technology — Computer graphics, image processing and environmental data representation — Information model for Mixed and Augmented Reality Contents - Core Objects and Attributes [original draft was Rigid cellular practice — classification and designation]
- ISO 3722:1976 Hydraulic fluid power — Fluid sample containers — Qualifying and controlling cleaning methods
- ISO 3723:2015 Hydraulic fluid power — Filter elements — Method for end load test
- ISO 3724:2007 Hydraulic fluid power — Filter elements — Determination of resistance to flow fatigue using particulate contaminant
- ISO 3725:2023 Ships and marine technology — Aquatic nuisance species — Methods for evaluating the performance of compliance monitoring devices for ballast water discharges [original draft was Statistics – Symbols, merged into ISO 3534]
- ISO 3726:1983 Instant coffee — Determination of loss in mass at 70 degrees C under reduced pressure
- ISO 3727 Butter — Determination of moisture, non-fat solids and fat contents
  - ISO 3727-1:2001 Part 1: Determination of moisture content (Reference method)
  - ISO 3727-2:2001 Part 2: Determination of non-fat solids content (Reference method)
  - ISO 3727-3:2003 Part 3: Calculation of fat content
- ISO 3728:2004 Ice-cream and milk ice — Determination of total solids content (Reference method)
- ISO 3729:1976 Fibre building boards — Determination of surface stability [Withdrawn without replacement]
- ISO 3730:2012 Shipbuilding and marine structures — Mooring winches
- ISO 3731:2003 Road vehicles — Connectors for the electrical connection of towing and towed vehicles — 7-pole connector type 24 S (supplementary) for vehicles with 24 V nominal supply voltage
- ISO 3732:2003 Road vehicles — Connectors for the electrical connection of towing and towed vehicles — 7-pole connector type 12 S (supplementary) for vehicles with 12 V nominal supply voltage
- ISO 3733:1999 Petroleum products and bituminous materials — Determination of water — Distillation method
- ISO 3734:1997 Petroleum products — Determination of water and sediment in residual fuel oils — Centrifuge method
- ISO 3735:1999 Crude petroleum and fuel oils — Determination of sediment — Extraction method
- ISO 3736 Digital fitting — Service process [original draft was Standard atmospheres for conditioning and/or testing — Specifications was numbered ISO 554 to replace ISO/R 554]
  - ISO/TD 3736-1:2022 Part 1: Ready-to-wear clothing online and off-line
  - ISO/TD 3736-2:2022 Part 2: Customized clothing online and off-line
- ISO 3737:1976 Agricultural tractors and self-propelled machines — Test method for enclosure pressurization systems [Withdrawn: replaced with ISO 14269-(1-5)]
- ISO 3738 Hardmetals — Rockwell hardness test (scale A)
  - ISO 3738-1:1982 Part 1: Test method
  - ISO 3738-2:1988 Part 2: Preparation and calibration of standard test blocks
- ISO 3739 Industrial tyres and rims
  - ISO 3739-1:2007 Part 1: Pneumatic tyres (metric series) on 5 degrees tapered or flat base rims
  - ISO 3739-2:2021 Part 2: Pneumatic tyres (metric series) on 5 degrees tapered or flat base rims — Load ratings
  - ISO 3739-3:2021 Part 3: Rims
- ISO 3740:2019 Acoustics – Determination of sound power levels of noise sources – Guidelines for the use of basic standards
- ISO 3741:2010 Acoustics – Determination of sound power levels and sound energy levels of noise sources using sound pressure – Precision methods for reverberation test rooms
- ISO 3742:1988 Acoustics — Determination of sound power levels of noise sources — Precision methods for discrete-frequency and narrow-band sources in reverberation rooms [Withdrawn: replaced with ISO 3741]
- ISO 3743 Acoustics – Determination of sound power levels and sound energy levels of noise sources using sound pressure – Engineering methods for small movable sources in reverberant fields
  - ISO 3743-1:2010 Part 1: Comparison method for a hard-walled test room
  - ISO 3743-2:2018 Part 2: Methods for special reverberation test rooms
- ISO 3744:2010 Acoustics – Determination of sound power levels and sound energy levels of noise sources using sound pressure – Engineering methods for an essentially free field over a reflecting plane
- ISO 3745:2012 Acoustics – Determination of sound power levels and sound energy levels of noise sources using sound pressure – Precision methods for anechoic rooms and hemi-anechoic rooms
- ISO 3746:2010 Acoustics – Determination of sound power levels and sound energy levels of noise sources using sound pressure – Survey method using an enveloping measurement surface over a reflecting plane
- ISO 3747:2010 Acoustics – Determination of sound power levels and sound energy levels of noise sources using sound pressure – Engineering/survey methods for use in situ in a reverberant environment
- ISO 3748 Acoustics — Determination of sound power levels of noise sources — Engineering method for small, nearly omnidirectional sources under free-field conditions over a reflecting plane [Rejected draft]
- ISO 3749:2022 Glass syringes — Determination of extractable tungsten [Original draft with this number unknown]
- ISO 3750:2006 Zinc alloys — Determination of magnesium content — Flame atomic absorption spectrometric method
- ISO 3751:1976 Zinc ingots — Selection and preparation of samples for chemical analysis [Withdrawn: replaced with ISO 20081]
- ISO 3752:1976 Zinc alloy ingots — Selection and preparation of samples for chemical analysis [Withdrawn: replaced with ISO 20081]
- ISO 3753:1977 Vacuum technology — Graphical symbols [Withdrawn without replacement]
- ISO 3754:1976 Steel — Determination of effective depth of hardening after flame or induction hardening [Withdrawn: replaced with ISO 18203]
- ISO 3755:1991 Cast carbon steels for general engineering purposes [Withdrawn: replaced with ISO 14737]
- ISO 3756:1976 Oil of cubeb
- ISO 3757:2002 Oil of patchouli (Pogostemon cablin (Blanco) Benth.)
- ISO 3758:2012 Textiles — Care labelling code using symbols
- ISO 3759:2011 Textiles — Preparation, marking and measuring of fabric specimens and garments in tests for determination of dimensional change
- ISO 3760:2002 Oil of celery seed (Apium graveolens L.)
- ISO 3761:2005 Oil of rosewood, Brazilian type (Aniba rosaeodora Ducke or Aniba parviflora (Meisn.) Mez.)
- ISO 3762:1979 Paper — Preparation of a letterpress print for test purposes [Withdrawn without replacement]
- ISO 3763:1976 Wrought steels — Macroscopic methods for assessing the content of non-metallic inclusions
- ISO 3764:2016 Timekeeping instruments — Movements — Types, dimensions and nomenclature
- ISO 3765:1998 Timekeeping instruments — Wristwatches — Dimensions of bracelet-to-case fastening elements
- ISO 3766:2003 Construction drawings – Simplified representation of concrete reinforcement
- ISO 3767 Tractors, machinery for agriculture and forestry, powered lawn and garden equipment – Symbols for operator controls and other displays
  - ISO 3767-1:2016 Part 1: Common symbols
  - ISO 3767-2:2016 Part 2: Symbols for agricultural tractors and machinery
  - ISO 3767-3:2016 Part 3: Symbols for powered lawn and garden equipment
  - ISO 3767-4:2016 Part 4: Symbols for forestry machinery
  - ISO 3767-5:2016 Part 5: Symbols for manual portable forestry machines
- ISO 3768:1976 Metallic coatings — Neutral salt spray test (NSS test) [Withdrawn: replaced with ISO 9227]
- ISO 3769:1976 Metallic coatings — Neutral salt spray test (NSS test) [Withdrawn: replaced with ISO 9227]
- ISO 3770:1976 Metallic coatings — Copper-accelerated acetic acid salt spray test (CASS test) [Withdrawn: replaced with ISO 9227]
- ISO 3771:2011 Petroleum products — Determination of base number — Perchloric acid potentiometric titration method
- ISO 3772:2000 Photography — Rolls of sensitized material for the pre-press industry — Dimensions and related requirements
- ISO 3773:1983 Cinematography — Tape splices for 8 mm Type S motion-picture film for projector use — Dimensions
- ISO 3774:1988 Cinematography — 35 mm motion-picture film perforated 8 mm Type S (1-3-5-7-0) and (1-0) — Cutting and perforating dimensions
- ISO 3775:1990 Cinematography — Printed 8 mm Type S image area on 16 mm motion-picture film perforated 8 mm Type S (1-3) — Position and dimensions [Withdrawn without replacement]
- ISO 3776 Tractors and machinery for agriculture — Seat belts
  - ISO 3776-1:2006 Part 1: Anchorage location requirements
  - ISO 3776-2:2013 Part 2: Anchorage strength requirements
  - ISO 3776-3:2009 Part 3: Requirements for assemblies
- ISO 3777:1976 Radiographic inspection of resistance spot welds for aluminium and its alloys — Recommended practice [Withdrawn without replacement]
- ISO/TR 3778:1987 Agricultural tractors — Maximum actuating forces required to operate controls [Withdrawn: replaced with ISO 15077]
- ISO 3779:2009 Road vehicles — Vehicle identification number (VIN) — Content and structure
- ISO 3780:2009 Road vehicles — World manufacturer identifier (WMI) code
- ISO 3781:2011 Paper and board — Determination of tensile strength after immersion in water
- ISO 3782:1980 Paper and board — Determination of resistance to picking — Accelerating speed method using the IGT tester (Pendulum or spring model) [Withdrawn without replacement]
- ISO 3783:2006 Paper and board — Determination of resistance to picking — Accelerated speed method using the IGT-type tester (electric model)
- ISO 3784:1976 Road vehicles — Measurement of impact velocity in collision tests
- ISO 3785:2006 Metallic materials — Designation of test specimen axes in relation to product texture
- ISO 3786:1975 Shipbuilding — Inland navigation towing hooks — Scale of tractive efforts [Withdrawn without replacement]
- ISO 3787:1976 Wood — Test methods — Determination of ultimate stress in compression parallel to grain [Withdrawn: replaced with ISO 13061-167]
- ISO/IEC 3788:1990 Information processing – 9-track, 12,7 mm (0,5 in) wide magnetic tape for information interchange using phase encoding at 126 ftpmm (3 200 ftpi), 63 cpmm (1 600 cpi)
- ISO 3789 Tractors, machinery for agriculture and forestry, powered lawn and garden equipment — Location and method of operation of operator controls
  - ISO 3789-1:1982 Part 1: Common controls [Withdrawn: replaced with ISO 15077]
  - ISO 3789-2:1982 Part 2: Controls for agricultural tractors and machinery [Withdrawn: replaced with ISO 15077]
- ISO 3790:1976 Fishing nets — Determination of elongation of netting yarns
- ISO 3791:1976 Office machines and data processing equipment – Keyboard layouts for numeric applications
- ISO 3792:1976 Adding machines – Layout of function keyboard
- ISO 3793:1976 Essential oils — Estimation of primary and secondary free alcohols content by acetylation in pyridine [Withdrawn without replacement]
- ISO 3794:1976 Essential oils (containing tertiary alcohols) — Estimation of free alcohols content by determination of ester value after acetylation
- ISO 3795:1989 Road vehicles, and tractors and machinery for agriculture and forestry — Determination of burning behaviour of interior materials
- ISO 3796:1999 Ships and marine technology — Clear openings for external single-leaf doors
- ISO 3797:1976 Shipbuilding — Vertical steel ladders
- ISO 3798:1976 Tinplate and blackplate — Minimum packaging requirements [Withdrawn without replacement]
- ISO 3799:1976 Textile machinery and accessories — Hydraulic lubricating fittings for textile machinery [Withdrawn without replacement]
- ISO 3800:1993 Threaded fasteners — Axial load fatigue testing — Test methods and evaluation of results
- ISO 3801:1977 Textiles — Woven fabrics — Determination of mass per unit length and mass per unit area
- ISO 3802:1976 Information processing – General purpose reels with 8 mm (5/16 in) centre hole for magnetic tape for interchange instrumentation applications
- ISO 3803:1984 Road vehicles — Hydraulic pressure test connection for braking equipment
- ISO 3804:1977 Plywood — Determination of dimensions of test pieces [Withdrawn: replaced with ISO 9424]
- ISO 3805:1977 Plywood — Determination of density [Withdrawn: replaced with ISO 9427]
- ISO 3806:1977 Plywood — Determination of moisture content [Withdrawn: replaced with ISO 9425]
- ISO 3807:2013 Gas cylinders — Acetylene cylinders — Basic requirements and type testing
- ISO 3808:2002 Road vehicles — Unscreened high-voltage ignition cables — General specifications, test methods and requirements
- ISO 3809:2004 Oil of lime (cold pressed), Mexican type (Citrus aurantifolia (Christm.) Swingle), obtained by mechanical means
- ISO 3810:1987 Floor tiles of agglomerated cork — Methods of test
- ISO 3811:1979 Meat and meat products — Detection and enumeration of presumptive coliform bacteria and presumptive Escherichia coli — (Reference method) [Withdrawn: replaced with ISO 4831, ISO 4832, and ISO 7251]
- ISO 3812:1976 Essential oils of geranium and rose — Determination of ester value after hot formylation
- ISO 3813:2004 Resilient floor coverings — Cork floor tiles — Specification [Withdrawn without replacement]
- ISO/TS 3814:2014 Standard tests for measuring reaction-to-fire of products and materials — Their development and application
- ISO 3815 Zinc and zinc alloys
  - ISO 3815-1:2005 Part 1: Analysis of solid samples by optical emission spectrometry
  - ISO 3815-2:2005 Part 2: Analysis by inductively coupled plasma optical emission spectrometry
- ISO 3816:1976 Zinc ingots — Selection and preparation of samples for spectrographic analysis [Withdrawn: replaced with ISO 20081]
- ISO 3817:1976 Zinc alloy ingots — Selection and preparation of samples for spectrographic analysis [Withdrawn: replaced with ISO 20081]
- ISO/TR 3818:1977 Ropes and cordage — Rope assemblies used in slinging — Safe working loads [Withdrawn without replacement]
- ISO 3819:2015 Laboratory glassware – Beakers
- ISO 3820:1978 Cinematography — Sprockets for 8 mm Type S motion-picture film — Dimensions and design
- ISO 3821:2019 Gas welding equipment — Rubber hoses for welding, cutting and allied processes
- ISO 3822 Acoustics – Laboratory tests on noise emission from appliances and equipment used in water supply installations
  - ISO 3822-1:1999 Part 1: Method of measurement
  - ISO 3822-2:1995 Part 2: Mounting and operating conditions for draw-off taps and mixing valves
  - ISO 3822-3:2018 Part 3: Mounting and operating conditions for in-line valves and appliances
  - ISO 3822-4:1997 Part 4: Mounting and operating conditions for special appliances
- ISO 3823 Dental rotary instruments — Burs
  - ISO 3823-1:1997 Part 1: Steel and carbide burs
  - ISO 3823-2:2003 Part 2: Finishing burs
- ISO 3824:1984 Dental silicophosphate cement (hand-mixed) [Withdrawn: replaced with ISO 9917]
- ISO 3825:1977 Glass transfusion bottles for medical use — Chemical resistance [Withdrawn without replacement]
- ISO 3826 Plastics collapsible containers for human blood and blood components
  - ISO 3826-1:2013 Part 1: Conventional containers
  - ISO 3826-2:2008 Part 2: Graphical symbols for use on labels and instruction leaflets
  - ISO 3826-3:2006 Part 3: Blood bag systems with integrated features
  - ISO 3826-4:2015 Part 4: Aphaeresis blood bag systems with integrated features
- ISO 3827 Shipbuilding — Co-ordination of dimensions in ships' accommodation
  - ISO 3827-1:1977 Part 1: Principles of dimensional co-ordination
  - ISO 3827-2:1977 Part 2: Glossary of terms
  - ISO 3827-3:1977 Part 3: Co-ordinating sizes for components and assemblies
  - ISO 3827-4:1977 Part 4: Controlling dimensions
  - ISO 3827-5:1979 Part 5: Co-ordinating sizes for key components
- ISO 3828:2008 Shipbuilding and marine structures – Deck machinery – Vocabulary and symbols
- ISO 3829 Petroleum products – Determination of density and relative density – Jaulmes pyknometer method [Rejected draft]
- ISO 3830:1993 Petroleum products — Determination of lead content of gasoline — Iodine monochloride method
- ISO 3831:1979 Timekeeping instruments — Classification and numbering system and nomenclature of components for watches and clocks [Withdrawn without replacement]
- ISO 3832:2002 Passenger cars — Luggage compartments — Method of measuring reference volume
- ISO 3833:1977 Road vehicles – Types – Terms and definitions
- ISO 3834 Quality requirements for fusion welding of metallic materials
  - ISO 3834-1:2021 Part 1: Criteria for the selection of the appropriate level of quality requirements
  - ISO 3834-2:2021 Part 2: Comprehensive quality requirements
  - ISO 3834-3:2021 Part 3: Standard quality requirements
  - ISO 3834-4:2021 Part 4: Elementary quality requirements
  - ISO 3834-5:2021 Part 5: Documents with which it is necessary to conform to claim conformity to the quality requirements of ISO 3834-2, ISO 3834-3 or ISO 3834-4
  - ISO 3834-6:2024 Part 6: Guidelines on implementing the ISO 3834 series
- ISO 3835 Equipment for vine cultivation and wine making – Vocabulary
  - ISO 3835-1:1976 (No part title)
  - ISO 3835-2:1977 (No part title) [Withdrawn without replacement]
  - ISO 3835-3:1980 (No part title)
  - ISO 3835-4:1981 (No part title)
  - ISO 3835-5:1982 (No part title) [Withdrawn without replacement]
- ISO/TR 3836:1978 Shoe sizes — System of width grading (for use in the Mondopoint system) [Withdrawn without replacement]
- ISO 3837:1993 Liquid petroleum products — Determination of hydrocarbon types — Fluorescent indicator adsorption method
- ISO 3838:2004 Crude petroleum and liquid or solid petroleum products — Determination of density or relative density — Capillary-stoppered pyknometer and graduated bicapillary pyknometer methods
- ISO 3839:1996 Petroleum products — Determination of bromine number of distillates and aliphatic olefins — Electrometric method
- ISO 3840:1976 Petroleum distillates — Determination of olefinic plus aromatic hydrocarbons content [Withdrawn without replacement]
- ISO 3841:1977 Petroleum waxes — Determination of melting point (cooling curve) [Withdrawn without replacement]
- ISO 3842:2006 Road vehicles — Fifth wheels — Interchangeability
- ISO 3843 Dentistry — Dental attachments — Measurement of placement and removal forces [Under development; original draft named ISO 2135 as it was a revision of ISO/R 2135]
- ISO 3844:1975 Shoe sizes — Method of marking [Withdrawn: replaced with ISO 9407]
- ISO 3845:2024 Oil and gas industries including lower carbon energy — Full ring ovalization test method for the evaluation of the cracking resistance of steel line pipe in sour service [original draft was Petroleum and natural gas industries — High-test steel line pipe]
- ISO 3846:2008 Hydrometry – Open channel flow measurement using rectangular broad-crested weirs
- ISO 3847:1977 Liquid flow measurement in open channels by weirs and flumes – End-depth method for estimation of flow in rectangular channels with a free overfall [Withdrawn: replaced with ISO 18481]
- ISO 3848:2016 Essential oil of citronella, Java type
- ISO 3849:2003 Oil of citronella, Sri Lankan type (Cymbopogon nardus (L.) W. Watson var. lenabatu Stapf.)
- ISO 3850:2004 Resilient floor coverings – Determination of apparent density of composition cork
- ISO 3851:1977 Capsulated dental silicate and silico-phosphate filling materials [Withdrawn: replaced with ISO 9917]
- ISO 3852:2007 Iron ores for blast furnace and direct reduction feedstocks — Determination of bulk density
- ISO 3853:1994 Road vehicles — Towing vehicle coupling device to tow caravans or light trailers — Mechanical strength test
- ISO 3854:1976 Road vehicles — Caravans and light trailers — Vacuum braking — Measurement of reaction time [Withdrawn without replacement]
- ISO 3855:1977 Milling cutters – Nomenclature
- ISO 3856 Paints and varnishes — Determination of "soluble" metal content
  - ISO 3856-1:1984 Part 1: Determination of lead content — Flame atomic absorption spectrometric method and dithizone spectrophotometric method
  - ISO 3856-2:1984 Part 2: Determination of antimony content — Flame atomic absorption spectrometric method and Rhodamine B spectrophotometric method
  - ISO 3856-3:1984 Part 3: Determination of barium content — Flame atomic emission spectrometric method
  - ISO 3856-4:1984 Part 4: Determination of cadmium content — Flame atomic absorption spectrometric method and polarographic method
  - ISO 3856-5:1984 Part 5: Determination of hexavalent chromium content of the pigment portion of the liquid paint or the paint in powder form — Diphenylcarbazide spectrophotometric method
  - ISO 3856-6:1984 Part 6: Determination of total chromium content of the liquid portion of the paint — Flame atomic absorption spectrometric method
  - ISO 3856-7:1984 Part 7: Determination of mercury content of the pigment portion of the paint and of the liquid portion of water-dilutable paints — Flameless atomic absorption spectrometric method
- ISO 3857 Compressors, pneumatic tools and machines – Vocabulary
  - ISO 3857-1:1977 Part 1: General
  - ISO 3857-2:1977 Part 2: Compressors
  - ISO 3857-3:1989 Part 3: Pneumatic tools and machines
  - ISO 3857-4:2012 Part 4: Air treatment
- ISO 3858:2018 Rubber compounding ingredients — Carbon black — Determination of light transmittance of toluene extract
- ISO 3859:2000 Inverse dovetail cutters and dovetail cutters with cylindrical shanks
- ISO 3860:2011 Bore cutters with key drive — Form milling cutters with constant profile
- ISO 3861:2005 Rubber hoses and hose assemblies for sand and grit blasting — Specification
- ISO 3862:2020 Rubber hoses and hose assemblies — Rubber-covered spiral-wire-reinforced hydraulic types for oil-based or water-based fluids — Specification
- ISO 3863:1989 Cylindrical cork stoppers — Dimensional characteristics, sampling, packaging and marking [Withdrawn without replacement]
- ISO 3864 Graphical symbols – Safety colours and safety signs
- ISO 3865:2020 Rubber, vulcanized or thermoplastic — Methods of test for staining in contact with organic material
- ISO 3866:1977 Office machines and printing machines used for information processing – Widths of fabric printing ribbons on spools exceeding 19 mm
- ISO 3867:2017 Composition cork — Expansion joint fillers — Test methods
- ISO 3868:1976 Metallic and other non-organic coatings — Measurement of coating thicknesses — Fizeau multiple-beam interferometry method
- ISO 3869:2017 Agglomerated cork — Expansion joint fillers — Specifications, packaging and marking
- ISO 3870:1976 Conveyor belts (fabric carcass), with length between pulley centres up to 300 m, for loose bulk materials — Adjustment of take-up device [Withdrawn without replacement]
- ISO 3871:2000 Road vehicles — Labelling of containers for petroleum-based or non-petroleum-based brake fluid
- ISO 3872:1976 Graphic technology — Sheet-fed printing machines — Range of sizes [Withdrawn without replacement]
- ISO 3873:1977 Industrial safety helmets
- ISO 3874:2017 Series 1 freight containers — Handling and securing
- ISO 3875:2020 Machine tools — Test conditions for external cylindrical centreless grinding machines — Testing of the accuracy
- ISO 3876:1986 Shipbuilding — Inland vessels — Hand-holes [Withdrawn without replacement]
- ISO 3877 Tyres, valves and tubes – List of equivalent terms
  - ISO 3877-1:1997 Part 1: Tyres
  - ISO 3877-2:1997 Part 2: Tyre valves
  - ISO 3877-3:1978 Part 3: Tubes
  - ISO 3877-4:1984 Part 4: Solid tyres
- ISO 3878:1983 Hardmetals — Vickers hardness test [Withdrawn without replacement]
- ISO 3879:1977 Welded joints — Recommended practice for liquid penetrant testing [Withdrawn: replaced with ISO 3452]
- ISO 3880 Building construction – Stairs – Vocabulary
  - ISO 3880-1:1977 [Withdrawn without replacement]
- ISO 3881:1977 Building construction — Modular co-ordination — Stairs and stair openings — Co-ordinating dimensions
- ISO 3882:2003 Metallic and other inorganic coatings — Review of methods of measurement of thickness
- ISO 3883:1977 Office machines – Line and character capacity of address masters
- ISO 3884:2025 Solid recovered fuels — Methods for the determination of the content of elements (Al, Ca, Fe, K, Mg, Na, P, S, Si, Ti, As, Ba, Be, Cd, Co, Cr, Cu, Hg, Mo, Mn, Ni, Pb, Sb, Se, Sn, Tl, V, Zn) [Original draft was Plastic identification card 1]
- ISO 3885 Solid recovered fuels — Determination of halogens and sulfur by oxidative pyrohydrolytic combustion followed by ion chromatography [under development; original draft with this number unknown
- ISO 3886:1986 Iron ores — Determination of manganese content — Periodate spectrophotometric method [Withdrawn: replaced with ISO 9682-2]
- ISO 3887:2007 Steels — Determination of the depth of decarburization
- ISO 3888 Passenger cars — Test track for a severe lane-change manoeuvre
  - ISO 3888-1:2018 Part 1: Double lane-change
  - ISO 3888-2:2011 Part 2: Obstacle avoidance
- ISO 3889:2006 Milk and milk products — Specification of Mojonnier-type fat extraction flasks
- ISO 3890 Milk and milk products — Determination of residues of organochlorine compounds (pesticides)
  - ISO 3890-1:2009 Part 1: General considerations and extraction methods
  - ISO 3890-2:2009 Part 2: Test methods for crude extract purification and confirmation
- ISO 3891:1978 Acoustics — Procedure for describing aircraft noise heard on the ground [Withdrawn without replacement]
- ISO 3892:2000 Conversion coatings on metallic materials — Determination of coating mass per unit area — Gravimetric methods
- ISO 3893:1977 Concrete — Classification by compressive strength [Withdrawn without replacement]
- ISO 3894:2015 Road vehicles — Wheels/rims for commercial vehicles — Test methods
- ISO 3895:1986 Road vehicles — Screened and waterproof spark-plug and its connection — Type 2
- ISO 3896:1986 Road vehicles — Screened and waterproof spark-plug and its connection — Type 3
- ISO 3897:1997 Photography — Processed photographic plates — Storage practices [Withdrawn: replaced with ISO 18918]
- ISO 3898:2013 Bases for design of structures — Names and symbols of physical quantities and generic quantities
- ISO 3899:2005 Rubber — Nitrile latex — Determination of residual acrylonitrile content
- ISO 3900:1995 Rubber — Nitrile latex — Determination of bound acrylonitrile content
- ISO 3901:2019 Information and documentation – International Standard Recording Code (ISRC)
- ISO 3902:1990 Shipbuilding and marine structures — Gaskets for rectangular windows and side scuttles
- ISO 3903:2012 Ships and marine technology — Ships' ordinary rectangular windows
- ISO 3904:1990 Shipbuilding and marine structures — Clear-view screens
- ISO 3905:1980 Paints and varnishes — Determination of contrast ratio (opacity) of light coloured paints at a fixed spreading rate (using black and white charts) [Withdrawn: replaced with ISO 6504-3]
- ISO 3906:1980 Paints and varnishes — Determination of contrast ratio (opacity) of light coloured paints at a fixed spreading rate (using polyester film) [Withdrawn: replaced with ISO 6504-3]
- ISO 3907:2009 Hardmetals — Determination of total carbon — Gravimetric method
- ISO 3908:2009 Hardmetals — Determination of insoluble (free) carbon — Gravimetric method
- ISO 3909:1976 Hardmetals — Determination of cobalt — Potentiometric method
- ISO 3910:1983 Rubber boots, unlined moulded [Withdrawn without replacement]
- ISO 3911:2021 Wheels and rims for pneumatic tyres – Vocabulary, designation and marking
- ISO 3912:1977 Woodruff keys and keyways [Withdrawn without replacement]
- ISO 3913:1977 Shipbuilding — Welded steel bollards
- ISO 3914 Textile machinery and accessories — Cylindrical tubes
  - ISO 3914-1:1994 Part 1: Recommended main dimensions
  - ISO 3914-2:1994 Part 2: Dimensions, tolerances and designation of tubes for open-end spinning machines
  - ISO 3914-3:1994 Part 3: Dimensions, tolerances and designation of tubes for tape yarns
  - ISO 3914-4:1994 Part 4: Dimensions, tolerances and designation of tubes for textured yarns [Withdrawn without replacement]
  - ISO 3914-5:1994 Part 5: Dimensions, tolerances and designation of tubes for continuous spin-drawn synthetic filament yarns [Withdrawn without replacement]
  - ISO 3914-6:1994 Part 6: Dimensions, tolerances and designation of tubes for cross-wound packages in winding and twisting [Withdrawn without replacement]
  - ISO 3914-7:1994 Part 7: Dimensions, tolerances and designation of perforated tubes for cheese dyeing
- ISO 3915:2022 Plastics — Measurement of resistivity of conductive plastics
- ISO 3916:1977 Shipbuilding — Inland navigation — Rope tubs [Withdrawn without replacement]
- ISO 3917:2016 Road vehicles — Safety glazing materials — Test methods for resistance to radiation, high temperature, humidity, fire and simulated weathering
- ISO 3918:2007 Milking machine installations – Vocabulary
- ISO 3919:2005 Coated abrasives — Flap wheels with shaft
- ISO 3920:1976 Honing stones of square section — Designation and dimensions [Withdrawn: replaced with ISO 603-(1-16)]
- ISO 3921:1976 Honing stones of rectangular section — Designation and dimensions [Withdrawn: replaced with ISO 603-(1-16)]
- ISO 3922:1978 Continuous mechanical handling equipment — Rotary vane feeder — Dimensional specifications [Withdrawn without replacement]
- ISO 3923 Metallic powders — Determination of apparent density
  - ISO 3923-1:2018 Part 1: Funnel method
  - ISO 3923-2:1981 Part 2: Scott volumeter method
  - ISO 3923-3:1986 Part 3: Oscillating funnel method [Withdrawn without replacement]
- ISO 3924:2019 Petroleum products — Determination of boiling range distribution — Gas chromatography method
- ISO 3925:2014 Unsealed radioactive substances — Identification and documentation
- ISO 3926:1980 Shipbuilding — Inland navigation — Couplings for oil and fuel reception — Mating dimensions [Withdrawn without replacement]
- ISO 3927:2017 Metallic powders, excluding powders for hardmetals — Determination of compressibility in uniaxial compression
- ISO 3928:2016 Sintered metal materials, excluding hardmetals — Fatigue test pieces
- ISO 3929:2003 Road vehicles — Measurement methods for exhaust gas emissions during inspection or maintenance
- ISO 3930:2000 Instruments for measuring vehicle exhaust emissions [Withdrawn without replacement]
- ISO 3931 Fibre building boards – Determination of transversal internal bond [Rejected draft]
- ISO 3932:1976 Textiles — Woven fabrics — Measurement of width of pieces [Withdrawn: replaced with ISO 22198]
- ISO 3933:1976 Textiles — Woven fabrics — Measurement of length of pieces [Withdrawn: replaced with ISO 22198]
- ISO 3934:2021 Rubber, vulcanized and thermoplastic — Preformed gaskets used in buildings — Classification, specifications and test methods
- ISO 3935:1977 Shipbuilding — Inland navigation — Fire-fighting water system — Pressures [Withdrawn without replacement]
- ISO 3936:1993 Reduction sleeves with tenon drive with external and internal 7/24 taper — Dimensions
- ISO 3937 Cutter arbors with tenon drive
  - ISO 3937-1:2008 Part 1: Dimensions of Morse taper
  - ISO 3937-2:2008 Part 2: Dimensions of 7/24 taper
  - ISO 3937-3:2008 Part 3: Dimensions of hollow taper interface with flange contact surface
- ISO 3938:1986 Hydraulic fluid power — Contamination analysis — Method for reporting analysis data [Withdrawn without replacement]
- ISO 3939:1977 Fluid power systems and components — Multiple lip packing sets — Methods for measuring stack heights
- ISO 3940:1977 Tapered die-sinking cutters with parallel shanks
- ISO 3941:1977 Classification of fires
- ISO 3942:1976 Photographic grade sodium carbonate, monohydrate — Specification [Withdrawn: replaced with ISO 424]
- ISO 3943:1993 Photography — Processing chemicals — Specifications for anhydrous sodium acetate
- ISO 3944:1992 Fertilizers — Determination of bulk density (loose)
- ISO 3945:1985 Mechanical vibration of large rotating machines with speed range from 10 to 200 r/s — Measurement and evaluation of vibration severity in situ [Withdrawn: replaced with ISO 10816-1]
- ISO 3946:1982 Starches and derived products — Determination of total phosphorus content — Spectrophotometric method
- ISO 3947:1977 Starches, native or modified — Determination of total fat content
- ISO 3948:1977 Shipbuilding — Inland vessels — Compressed-air systems — Pressure ranges [Withdrawn without replacement]
- ISO 3949:2020 Plastics hoses and hose assemblies — Textile-reinforced types for hydraulic applications — Specification
- ISO 3950:2016 Dentistry – Designation system for teeth and areas of the oral cavity
- ISO 3951 Sampling procedures for inspection by variables
  - ISO 3951-1:2022 Part 1: Specification for single sampling plans indexed by acceptance quality limit (AQL) for lot-by-lot inspection for a single quality characteristic and a single AQL
  - ISO 3951-2:2013 Part 2: General specification for single sampling plans indexed by acceptance quality limit (AQL) for lot-by-lot inspection of independent quality characteristics
  - ISO 3951-3:2007 Part 3: Double sampling schemes indexed by acceptance quality limit (AQL) for lot-by-lot inspection
  - ISO 3951-4:2011 Part 4: Procedures for assessment of declared quality levels
  - ISO 3951-5:2006 Part 5: Sequential sampling plans indexed by acceptance quality limit (AQL) for inspection by variables (known standard deviation)
- ISO 3952 Kinematic diagrams – Graphical symbols
  - ISO 3952-1:1981 (Motion of links of mechanisms; Kinematic pairs; Links and connections of their components; Linkage of bars and their links)
  - ISO 3952-2:1981 (Friction and gear mechanisms; Cam mechanisms)
  - ISO 3952-3:1979 (Maltese and ratchet mechanisms; Couplings and brakes)
  - ISO 3952-4:1984 (Miscellaneous mechanisms and their components)
- ISO 3953:2011 Metallic powders — Determination of tap density
- ISO 3954:2007 Powders for powder metallurgical purposes — Sampling
- ISO 3955:1977 Sintered metal materials, excluding hardmetals — Sampling [Withdrawn without replacement]
- ISO/TR 3956:1975 Principles of structural fire-engineering design with special regard to the connection between real fire exposure and the heating conditions of the standard fire-resistance test (ISO 834)
- ISO 3957:2025 Reaction to fire tests — Façades — Measurement of heat and smoke generation in severe exterior fire scenarios [original draft Graphic symbols — Index, survey, and compilation of the single sheets became ISO 7000]
- ISO 3958:1996 Passenger cars — Driver hand-control reach
- ISO 3959:1977 Green bananas — Ripening conditions
- ISO 3960:2017 Animal and vegetable fats and oils — Determination of peroxide value — Iodometric (visual) endpoint determination
- ISO 3961:2018 Animal and vegetable fats and oils — Determination of iodine value
- ISO 3962:1977 Materials and equipment for petroleum and natural gas industries — Tool joints for steel drill pipe for oil or natural gas wells [Withdrawn without replacement]
- ISO 3963:1977 Fertilizers — Sampling from a conveyor by stopping the belt
- ISO 3964:2016 Dentistry — Coupling dimensions for handpiece connectors
- ISO 3965:1990 Agricultural wheeled tractors — Maximum speeds — Method of determination
- ISO 3966:2020 Measurement of fluid flow in closed conduits – Velocity area method using Pitot static tubes
- ISO 3967 Petroleum products – Determination of density and relative density – Bingham pyknometer method [Rejected draft]
- ISO 3968:2017 Hydraulic fluid power — Filters — Evaluation of differential pressure versus flow
- ISO 3969:1979 Shipbuilding — Inland vessels — Operational documentation [Withdrawn without replacement]
- ISO 3970:1977 Modular units for machine tool construction — Integral way columns — Floor-mounted type
- ISO 3971:1977 Rice milling — Symbols and equivalent terms [Withdrawn without replacement]
- ISO 3972:2011 Sensory analysis — Methodology — Method of investigating sensitivity of taste
- ISO 3973:1996 Living animals for slaughter — Vocabulary — Bovines [Withdrawn without replacement]
- ISO 3974:1977 Definitions of living animals for slaughter — Ovines
- ISO 3975:1977 Definitions of living animals for slaughter — Horses [Withdrawn without replacement]
- ISO 3976:2006 Milk fat — Determination of peroxide value
- ISO 3977 Gas turbines – Procurement
- ISO 3978:1976 Aluminium and aluminium alloys — Determination of chromium — Spectrophotometric method using diphenylcarbazide, after extraction
- ISO 3979:1977 Aluminium and aluminium alloys — Determination of nickel — Spectrophotometric method using dimethylglyoxime [Withdrawn without replacement]
- ISO 3980:1977 Aluminium and aluminium alloys — Determination of copper — Atomic absorption spectrophotometric method
- ISO 3981:1977 Aluminium and aluminium alloys — Determination of nickel — Atomic absorption spectrophotometric method
- ISO 3982 Chemical analysis of aluminum and its alloys — Complexometric determination of magnesium [Rejected draft]
- ISO 3983:1977 Cereals and cereal products — Determination of alpha-amylase activity — Colorimetric method [Withdrawn without replacement]
- ISO 3984:2004 Road vehicles — Rear moving barrier impact test procedure [Withdrawn without replacement]
- ISO/TR 3985:2021 Biotechnology — Data publication — Preliminary considerations and concepts [Original draft with this number unknown]
- ISO 3986 Petroleum products — Lubricating wax — Determination of cone penetration [Rejected draft]
- ISO 3987:2010 Petroleum products — Determination of sulfated ash in lubricating oils and additives
- ISO 3988 Determination of Spontaneous ignition temperature [Rejected draft]
- ISO 3989 Measurement of airborne noise emitted by compressor units including prime movers [Rejected draft]
- ISO 3990:2023 Dentistry — Evaluation of antibacterial activity of dental restorative materials, luting cements, fissure sealants and orthodontic bonding or luting materials [original draft was Modular co-ordination — Sizes for co-ordinating lengths and widths of openings in the horizontal plane]
- ISO 3991:2025 Agricultural machinery — Robotic feed systems — Safety [original draft was Modular co-ordination — Sizes for co-ordinating heights of openings in the vertical plane]
- ISO 3992 Petroleum waxes — Determination of needle penetration [Rejected draft]
- ISO 3993:1984 Liquefied petroleum gas and light hydrocarbons — Determination of density or relative density — Pressure hydrometer method
- ISO 3994:2014 Plastics hoses — Helical-thermoplastic-reinforced thermoplastics hoses for suction and discharge of aqueous materials — Specification
- ISO 3995:1985 Metallic powders — Determination of green strength by transverse rupture of rectangular compacts
- ISO 3996:1995 Road vehicles — Brake hose assemblies for hydraulic braking systems used with non-petroleum-base brake fluid
- ISO 3997 Bitumen and bituminous binders – Determination of needle penetration [Rejected draft]
- ISO 3998:1977 Textiles — Determination of resistance to certain insect pests
- ISO 3999:2004 Radiation protection — Apparatus for industrial gamma radiography — Specifications for performance, design and tests

== ISO 4000 – ISO 4499 ==
- ISO 4000 Passenger car tyres and rims
  - ISO 4000-1:2021 Part 1: Tyres (metric series)
  - ISO 4000-2:2021 Part 2: Rims
- ISO 4001:1977 Shipbuilding — Inland navigation — Raft-type life-saving apparatus [Withdrawn without replacement]
- ISO 4002 Equipment for sowing and planting
  - ISO 4002-1:1979 Part 1: Concave disks type D1 — Dimensions
  - ISO 4002-2:1977 Part 2: Flat disks type D2 with single bevel — Dimensions
- ISO 4003:1977 Permeable sintered metal materials — Determination of bubble test pore size
- ISO 4004:1983 Agricultural tractors and machinery — Track widths
- ISO/IEC 4005 Telecommunications and information exchange between systems — Low altitude drone area network (LADAN) [Original draft with this number unknown]
- ISO/IEC 4005-1:2023 Part 1: Communication model and requirements
- ISO/IEC 4005-2:2023 Part 2: Physical and data link protocols for shared communication
- ISO/IEC 4005-3:2023 Part 3: Physical and data link protocols for control communication
- ISO/IEC 4005-4:2023 Part 4: Physical and data link protocols for video communication
- ISO 4006:1991 Measurement of fluid flow in closed conduits – Vocabulary and symbols
- ISO 4007:2018 Personal protective equipment – Eye and face protection – Vocabulary
- ISO 4008 Road vehicles — Fuel injection pump testing
  - ISO 4008-1:1980 Part 1: Dynamic conditions
  - ISO 4008-2:1983 Part 2: Static conditions
  - ISO 4008-3:1987 Part 3: Application and test procedures
- ISO 4009:2000 Commercial vehicles — Location of electrical and pneumatic connections between towing vehicles and trailers [Withdrawn without replacement]
- ISO 4010:1998 Diesel engines — Calibrating nozzle, delay pintle type
- ISO/TR 4011:1976 Road vehicles — Apparatus for measurement of the opacity of exhaust gas from diesel engines [Withdrawn: replaced with ISO 11614]
- ISO 4012:1978 Concrete — Determination of compressive strength of test specimens [Withdrawn: replaced with ISO 1920-4]
- ISO 4013:1978 Concrete — Determination of flexural strength of test specimens [Withdrawn: replaced with ISO 1920-4]
- ISO 4014:2022 Hexagon head bolts — Product grades A and B
- ISO 4015:2022 Hexagon head bolts — Product grade B — Reduced shank (shank diameter approximately equal to pitch diameter)
- ISO 4016:2011 Hexagon head bolts — Product grade C
- ISO 4017:2014 Fasteners — Hexagon head screws — Product grades A and B
- ISO 4018:2011 Hexagon head screws — Product grade C
- ISO 4019:2001 Structural steels — Cold-formed, welded, structural hollow sections — Dimensions and sectional properties [Withdrawn: replaced with ISO 10799-2]
- ISO 4020:2001 Road vehicles — Fuel filters for diesel engines — Test methods
- ISO 4021:1992 Hydraulic fluid power — Particulate contamination analysis — Extraction of fluid samples from lines of an operating system
- ISO 4022:2018 Permeable sintered metal materials — Determination of fluid permeability
- ISO 4023:2009 Rubber hoses and hose assemblies for steam — Test methods
- ISO 4024:1992 Road vehicles — Ignition coils — Low-tension cable connections
- ISO 4025 The physical and mechanical properties of bagasse particleboards [Rejected draft]
- ISO 4026:2003 Hexagon socket set screws with flat point
- ISO 4027:2003 Hexagon socket set screws with cone point
- ISO 4028:2003 Hexagon socket set screws with dog point
- ISO 4029:2003 Hexagon socket set screws with cup point
- ISO 4030:1983 Road vehicles — Vehicle identification number (VIN) — Location and attachment
- ISO 4031:1978 Information interchange – Representation of local time differentials [Withdrawn: replaced with ISO 8601:1988]
- ISO 4032:2012 Hexagon regular nuts (style 1) — Product grades A and B
- ISO 4033:2012 Hexagon high nuts (style 2) — Product grades A and B
- ISO 4034:2012 Hexagon regular nuts (style 1) — Product grade C [Withdrawn without replacement]
- ISO 4035:2012 Hexagon thin nuts chamfered (style 0) — Product grades A and B
- ISO 4036:2012 Hexagon thin nuts unchamfered (style 0) — Product grade B [Withdrawn without replacement]
- ISO 4037 X and gamma reference radiation for calibrating dosemeters and doserate meters and for determining their response as a function of photon energy
  - ISO 4037-1:1996 Part 1: Radiation characteristics and production
  - ISO 4037-2:1997 Part 2: Dosimetry for radiation protection over the energy ranges from 8 keV to 1,3 MeV and 4 MeV to 9 MeV
  - ISO 4037-3:1999 Part 3: Calibration of area and personal dosemeters and the measurement of their response as a function of energy and angle of incidence
  - ISO 4037-4:2004 Part 4: Calibration of area and personal dosemeters in low energy X reference radiation fields
- ISO 4038:1996 Road vehicles — Hydraulic braking systems — Simple flare pipes, tapped holes, male fittings and hose end fittings
- ISO 4039 Road vehicles — Pneumatic braking systems
  - ISO 4039-1:1998 Part 1: Pipes, male fittings and tapped holes with facial sealing surface
  - ISO 4039-2:1998 Part 2: Pipes, male fittings and holes with conical sealing surface
- ISO 4040:2009 Road vehicles — Location of hand controls, indicators and tell-tales in motor vehicles
- ISO 4041:1978 Rotary drilling equipment — Rotary hoses [Withdrawn without replacement]
- ISO 4042:2018 Fasteners — Electroplated coating systems
- ISO 4043:2016 Simultaneous interpreting — Mobile booths — Requirements [Withdrawn: replaced with ISO 17651-2]
- ISO 4044:2017 Leather — Chemical tests — Preparation of chemical test samples
- ISO 4045:2018 Leather — Chemical tests — Determination of pH and difference figure
- ISO 4046 Paper, board, pulps and related terms – Vocabulary
  - ISO 4046-1:2016 Part 1: Alphabetical index
  - ISO 4046-2:2016 Part 2: Pulping terminology
  - ISO 4046-3:2016 Part 3: Paper-making terminology
  - ISO 4046-4:2016 Part 4: Paper and board grades and converted products
  - ISO 4046-5:2016 Part 5: Properties of pulp, paper and board
- ISO 4047:1977 Leather — Determination of sulphated total ash and sulphated water-insoluble ash
- ISO 4048:2018 Leather — Chemical tests — Determination of matter soluble in dichloromethane and free fatty acid content
- ISO 4049:2019 Dentistry — Polymer-based restorative materials
- ISO 4050:1977 Shipbuilding — Inland vessels — "Rhine" and Hall's stockless anchors [Withdrawn without replacement]
- ISO 4051:1977 Shipbuilding — Inland vessels — Steering gear — Values of torques [Withdrawn without replacement]
- ISO 4052:1983 Coffee — Determination of caffeine content (Reference method) [Withdrawn without replacement]
- ISO 4053 Measurement of gas flow in conduits — Tracer methods
  - ISO 4053-1:1977 Part 1: General [Withdrawn without replacement]
  - ISO 4053-4:1978 Part 4: Transit time method using radioactive tracers [Withdrawn without replacement]
- ISO 4054:1980 Couplers, loose spigots and base-plates for use in working scaffolds made of steel tubes — Requirements and test procedure [Withdrawn without replacement]
- ISO 4055:1977 Road vehicles — Caravans and light trailers — Electromagnetic braking [Withdrawn without replacement]
- ISO 4056:1978 Polyethylene (PE) pipes and fittings — Designation of polyethylene, based on nominal density and melt flow index [Withdrawn: replaced with ISO 10162]
- ISO 4057:1986 Information processing – Data interchange on 6,30 mm (0.25 in) magnetic tape cartridge, 63 bpmm (1 600 bpi) phase-encoded [Withdrawn without replacement]
- ISO 4058:1977 Magnesium and its alloys — Determination of nickel — Photometric method using dimethylglyoxime [Withdrawn without replacement]
- ISO 4059:1978 Polyethylene (PE) pipes — Pressure drop in mechanical pipe-jointing systems — Method of test and requirements
- ISO 4060 Road vehicles — Seat belts — Adjusting devices [Rejected draft]
- ISO 4061 Soldering — Quality requirements for soldering of metallic materials [Rejected draft; original was Road vehicles — Seat belts equipment with push-button buckles — Handling characteristics]
- ISO 4062:1977 Dictation equipment — Symbols [Withdrawn: replaced by ISO 13251]
- ISO 4063:2009 Welding and allied processes – Nomenclature of processes and reference numbers
- ISO 4064 Water meters for cold potable water and hot water
  - ISO 4064-1:2014 Part 1: Metrological and technical requirements
  - ISO 4064-2:2014 Part 2: Test methods
  - ISO 4064-3:2014 Part 3: Test report format
  - ISO 4064-4:2014 Part 4: Non-metrological requirements not covered in ISO 4064-1
  - ISO 4064-5:2014 Part 5: Installation requirements
- ISO 4065:2018 Thermoplastics pipes — Universal wall thickness table
- ISO 4066:1994 Construction drawings — Bar scheduling [Withdrawn: replaced with ISO 3766]
- ISO 4067 Technical drawings — Installations
  - ISO 4067-1:1984 Part 1: Graphical symbols for plumbing, heating, ventilation and ducting [Withdrawn without replacement]
  - ISO 4067-2:1980 Part 2: Simplified representation of sanitary appliances [Withdrawn without replacement]
  - ISO 4067-3:1984 Part 3: Graphical symbols for automatic control [Rejected draft later published as ISO/TR 8545]
  - ISO 4067-6:1985 Part 6: Graphical symbols for supply water and drainage systems in the ground [Withdrawn without replacement]
- ISO 4068:1978 Building and civil engineering drawings — Reference lines [Withdrawn without replacement]
- ISO 4069:1977 Building and civil engineering drawings — Representation of areas on sections and views — General principles [Withdrawn without replacement]
- ISO 4070:2025 Polyvinylidene fluoride (PVDF) — Effect of time and temperature on expected strength [original draft with this number unknown]
- ISO 4071:1978 Indirect-reading capacitor-type pocket exposure meters and accessory electrometers [Withdrawn: replaced with ISO 11934, now withdrawn without replacement]
- ISO 4072:1982 Green coffee in bags — Sampling
- ISO 4073:2009 Dentistry — Information system on the location of dental equipment in the working area of the oral health care provider
- ISO 4074:2015 Natural latex rubber condoms – Requirements and test methods
- ISO 4075:2025 Polysulfone (PSU) — Effect of time and temperature on expected strength [original draft with this number unknown]
- ISO 4076:2025 Polyphenylsulphone (PPSU) — Effect of time and temperature on expected strength [original draft with this number unknown]
- ISO 4077:2023 Coal — Guide to sampling in coal preparation plants [original draft with this number unknown]
- ISO 4078 Sustainable mobility and transportation — Roadside feeding electric road system [original draft with this number unknown]
  - ISO 4078-1 Part 1: Service role architecture [Under development]
  - ISO 4078-2 Part 2: Sustainable mobility and transportation [Under development]
- ISO 4079:2020 Rubber hoses and hose assemblies — Textile-reinforced hydraulic types for oil-based or water-based fluids — Specification
- ISO 4080:2009 Rubber and plastics hoses and hose assemblies — Determination of permeability to gas
- ISO 4081:2016 Rubber hoses and tubing for cooling systems for internal-combustion engines — Specification
- ISO 4082:1981 Road vehicles — Motor vehicles — Flasher units
- ISO 4083 Wood and wood-based products - Overview related to the concepts of renewability, reusability, recoverability, recyclability, compostability, biodegradability and circularity – Terminology and existing methodology [Under development; original draft was Dental operating chair — General requirements]
- ISO 4084:1977 Aircraft — Repairable contactors (not hermetically sealed) — Performance requirements [Withdrawn without replacement]
- ISO 4085:1979 Shipbuilding — Inland navigation — Swing derricks [Withdrawn without replacement]
- ISO 4086:2001 Road vehicles — 90 semi-trailer fifth wheel kingpin — Interchangeability
- ISO 4087:2005 Micrographics – Microfilming of newspapers for archival purposes on 35 mm microfilm
- ISO/TR 4088:1977 Rubber Thread – Classification [Withdrawn without replacement]
- ISO 4089:1979 Shipbuilding — Inland navigation — Sealing rubber for covers of cargo hatches [Withdrawn without replacement]
- ISO 4090:2001 Photography — Medical radiographic cassettes/screens/films and hard-copy imaging films — Dimensions and specifications
- ISO 4091:2003 Road vehicles — Connectors for the electrical connection of towing and towed vehicles — Definitions, tests and requirements
- ISO 4092:1988 Road vehicles — Diagnostic systems for motor vehicles — Vocabulary [Withdrawn without replacement]
- ISO 4093:1999 Diesel engines — Fuel injection pumps — High-pressure pipes for testing
- ISO 4094:2017 Paper, board and pulps — General requirements for the competence of laboratories authorized for the issue of optical reference transfer standards of level 3
- ISO 4095:1998 Aerospace — Bihexagonal drives — Wrenching configuration — Metric series
- ISO 4096:1978 Essential oils (containing tertiary alcohols) — Evaluation of free alcohols content by determination of ester value after cold formylation [Withdrawn without replacement]
- ISO 4097:2020 Rubber, ethylene-propylene-diene (EPDM) — Evaluation procedure
- ISO 4098:2018 Leather — Chemical tests — Determination of water-soluble matter, water-soluble inorganic matter and water-soluble organic matter
- ISO 4099:1984 Cheese — Determination of nitrate and nitrite contents — Method by cadmium reduction and photometry [Withdrawn: replaced with ISO 14673-(1-3)]
- ISO 4100:1980 Road vehicles — World parts manufacturer identifier (WPMI) code
- ISO 4101:1983 Drawn steel wire for elevator ropes — Specifications
- ISO 4102:1984 Equipment for crop protection — Sprayers — Connection threading
- ISO 4103:1979 Concrete — Classification of consistency [Withdrawn without replacement]
- ISO 4104:1984 Dental zinc polycarboxylate cements [Withdrawn: replaced with ISO 9917]
- ISO 4105:1978 Textile machinery and accessories — Wires for flexible card clothings
- ISO 4106:2012 Motorcycles — Engine test code — Net power
- ISO 4107:2010 Commercial vehicles — Wheel-hub attachment dimensions
- ISO 4108:1980 Concrete — Determination of tensile splitting strength of test specimens [Withdrawn: replaced with ISO 1920-4]
- ISO 4109:1980 Fresh concrete — Determination of the consistency — Slump test [Withdrawn: replaced with ISO 1920-2]
- ISO 4110:1979 Fresh concrete — Determination of the consistency — Vebe test [Withdrawn: replaced with ISO 1920-2]
- ISO 4111:1979 Fresh concrete — Determination of consistency — Degree of compactibility (Compaction index) [Withdrawn: replaced with ISO 1920-2]
- ISO 4112:1990 Cereals and pulses — Guidance on measurement of the temperature of grain stored in bulk
- ISO 4113:2010 Road vehicles — Calibration fluids for diesel injection equipment
- ISO/TR 4114:1979 Road vehicles — Caravans and light trailers — Static load on ball couplings [Withdrawn without replacement]
- ISO 4115:1997 Air cargo equipment — Air/land pallet nets
- ISO 4116:1986 Air cargo equipment — Ground equipment requirements for compatibility with aircraft unit load devices
- ISO 4117:1993 Air and air/land cargo pallets — Specification and testing
- ISO 4118:2016 Air cargo — Non-certified lower deck containers — Design and testing
- ISO 4119:1995 Pulps — Determination of stock concentration
- ISO 4120:2021 Sensory analysis — Methodology — Triangle test
- ISO 4121:2003 Sensory analysis — Guidelines for the use of quantitative response scales
- ISO/TR 4122:1977 Equipment for working the soil — Dimensions of flat disks — Type A [Withdrawn without replacement]
- ISO 4123:1979 Belt conveyors — Impact rings for carrying idlers and discs for return idlers — Main dimensions
- ISO 4124:1994 Liquid hydrocarbons — Dynamic measurement — Statistical control of volumetric metering systems
- ISO 4125:1991 Dry fruits and dried fruits – Definitions and nomenclature
- ISO 4126 Safety devices for protection against excessive pressure
  - ISO 4126-1:2013 Part 1: Safety valves
  - ISO 4126-2:2018 Part 2: Bursting disc safety devices
  - ISO 4126-3:2020 Part 3: Safety valves and bursting disc safety devices in combination
  - ISO 4126-4:2013 Part 4: Pilot operated safety valves
  - ISO 4126-5:2013 Part 5: Controlled safety pressure relief systems (CSPRS)
  - ISO 4126-6:2014 Part 6: Application, selection and installation of bursting disc safety devices
  - ISO 4126-7:2013 Part 7: Common data
  - ISO 4126-9:2008 Part 9: Application and installation of safety devices excluding stand-alone bursting disc safety devices
  - ISO 4126-10:2010 Part 10: Sizing of safety valves for gas/liquid two-phase flow
- ISO 4127 Shipbuilding — Inland navigation — Fairleads
  - ISO 4127-1:1979 Part 1: Two-lip fairleads [Withdrawn without replacement]
  - ISO 4127-2:1979 Part 2: Two-Roller fairleads [Withdrawn without replacement]
- ISO 4128:1985 Aircraft — Air mode modular containers
- ISO 4129:2012 Road vehicles – Mopeds – Symbols for controls, indicators and tell-tales [Withdrawn without replacement]
- ISO 4130:1978 Road vehicles – Three-dimensional reference system and fiducial marks – Definitions
- ISO 4131:1979 Road vehicles — Dimensional codes for passenger cars
- ISO 4132:1979 Unplasticized polyvinyl chloride (PVC) and metal adaptor fittings for pipes under pressure — Laying lengths and size of threads — Metric series
- ISO 4133:1979 Meat and meat products — Determination of glucono-delta-lactone content (Reference method) [Withdrawn without replacement]
- ISO 4134:2021 Meat and meat products — Determination of L-(+)-glutamic acid content — Reference method
- ISO 4135:2022 Anaesthetic and respiratory equipment – Vocabulary
- ISO 4136:2022 Destructive tests on welds in metallic materials — Transverse tensile test
- ISO/TR 4137:1978 Plastics — Determination of modulus of elasticity by alternating flexure [Withdrawn without replacement]
- ISO 4138:2021 Passenger cars — Steady-state circular driving behaviour — Open-loop test methods
- ISO 4139:1979 Ferrosilicon – Determination of aluminium content – Flame atomic absorption spectrometric method
- ISO 4140:1979 Ferrochromium and ferrosilicochromium – Determination of chromium content – Potentiometric method
- ISO 4141 Road vehicles — Multi-core connecting cables
  - ISO 4141-1:2019 Part 1: Test methods and requirements for basic performance sheathed cables
  - ISO 4141-2:2019 Part 2: Test methods and requirements for high performance sheathed cables
  - ISO 4141-3:2019 Part 3: Construction, dimensions and marking of unscreened sheathed low-voltage cables
  - ISO 4141-4:2009 Part 4: Test methods and requirements for coiled cable assemblies
- ISO 4142:2002 Laboratory glassware — Test tubes
- ISO 4143:1981 Shipbuilding — Inland vessels — Open rowing lifeboats [Withdrawn without replacement]
- ISO 4144:2003 Pipework — Stainless steel fittings threaded in accordance with ISO 7-1
- ISO 4145:1986 Non-alloy steel fittings threaded to ISO 7-1
- ISO 4146:1980 Shipbuilding — Inland vessels — Manholes [Withdrawn: replaced by ISO 5894]
- ISO 4147:1997 Aerospace — Nuts, hexagonal, slotted (castellated), normal height, normal across flats, with MJ threads, classifications: 600 MPa (at ambient temperature)/120 degrees C, 600 MPa (at ambient temperature)/235 degrees C, 900 MPa (at ambient temperature)/425 degrees C, 1 100 MPa (at ambient temperature)/235 degrees C, 1 100 MPa (at ambient temperature)/315 degrees C, 1 100 MPa (at ambient temperature)/650 degrees C, 1 210 MPa (at ambient temperature)/730 degrees C, 1 250 MPa (at ambient temperature)/235 degrees C and 1 550 MPa (at ambient temperature)/600 degrees C — Dimensions
- ISO 4148:2004 Road vehicles — Special warning lamps — Dimensions
- ISO 4149:2005 Green coffee — Olfactory and visual examination and determination of foreign matter and defects
- ISO 4150:2011 Green coffee or raw coffee — Size analysis — Manual and machine sieving
- ISO 4151:1987 Road vehicles — Mopeds — Type, location and functions of controls [Withdrawn without replacement]
- ISO 4152:2021 Glass‐reinforced thermosetting plastics (GRP) pipes — Determination of the apparent axial long‐term modulus of pipes subject to beam bending [Originally planned ISO 4152 was Welder's test on non-alloy and low-alloy steels for manual metal arc welding]
- ISO 4153:1981 Aircraft — Pressure fuel dispensing system — Test procedure and limit value for shut-off surge pressure
- ISO 4154:2022 Traditional Chinese medicine — Sinomenium acutum stem [Original plan for this number unknown]
- ISO 4155:2022 Magnesium and magnesium alloys — Determination of nickel — Inductively coupled plasma optical emission spectrometric method [Original plan for this number unknown]
- ISO 4156 Straight cylindrical involute splines — Metric module, side fit
  - ISO 4156-1:2021 Part 1: Generalities
  - ISO 4156-2:2021 Part 2: Dimensions
  - ISO 4156-3:2021 Part 3: Inspection
- ISO 4157 Construction drawings – Designation systems
- ISO 4158:1978 Ferrosilicon, ferrosilicomanganese and ferrosilicochromium – Determination of silicon content – Gravimetric method
- ISO 4159:1978 Ferromanganese and ferrosilicomanganese – Determination of manganese content – Potentiometric method
- ISO 4160 Hexagon nuts and bolts with flange, style 1 — Small Series — Product grade B [Draft merged into ISO 4161 and ISO 4162]
- ISO 4161:2012 Hexagon nuts with flange, style 2 — Coarse thread
- ISO 4162:2012 Hexagon bolts with flange — Small series — Product grade A with driving feature of product grade B
- ISO 4164:2012 Mopeds — Engine test code — Net power
- ISO 4165 Road vehicles — Electrical connections — Double-pole connection
- ISO 4166:1979 Hexagon nuts for fine mechanics — Product grade F [Withdrawn without replacement]
- ISO 4167:2012 Polyolefin agricultural twines
- ISO 4168:2002 Timekeeping instruments — Conditions for carrying out checks on radioluminescent deposits [Withdrawn without replacement]
- ISO 4169:1979 Office machines — Keyboards — Key numbering system and layout charts
- ISO 4170:1995 Air cargo equipment — Interline pallet nets
- ISO 4171:1993 Air cargo equipment — Interline pallets
- ISO 4172:1991 Technical drawings – Construction drawings – Drawings for the assembly of prefabricated structures
- ISO 4173:1980 Ferromolybdenum – Determination of molybdenum content – Gravimetric method
- ISO 4174:1998 Cereals, oilseeds and pulses — Measurement of unit pressure loss in one-dimensional air flow through bulk grain
- ISO 4175:1979 Shipbuilding — Shipborne barges, series 1 — Main dimensions [Withdrawn without replacement]
- ISO 4176:1981 Fertilizers — Determination of nitrate nitrogen content — Nitron gravimetric method [Withdrawn without replacement]
- ISO 4177 Magnesium and magnesium alloys – Determination of chromium – Inductively coupled plasma optical emission spectrometric method [rejected draft; original draft with this number unknown]
- ISO 4178:1980 Complete, filled transport packages — Distribution trials — Information to be recorded
- ISO 4179:2024 Ductile iron pipes and fittings for pressure and non-pressure pipelines – Cement mortar lining
- ISO 4180:2019 Packaging — Complete, filled transport packages — General rules for the compilation of performance test schedules
- ISO 4181 Magnesium and magnesium alloys — Determination of strontium — Inductively coupled plasma optical emission spectrometric method [rejected draft; original draft with this number unknown]
- ISO 4182:1999 Motor vehicles — Measurement of variations in dipped-beam headlamp angle as a function of load [Withdrawn without replacement]
- ISO 4183:1995 Belt drives — Classical and narrow V-belts — Grooved pulleys (system based on datum width)
- ISO 4184:1992 Belt drives — Classical and narrow V-belts — Lengths in datum system
- ISO 4185:1980 Measurement of liquid flow in closed conduits – Weighing method
- ISO 4186:1980 Asparagus — Guide to storage
- ISO 4187:1980 Horse-radish — Guide to storage [Withdrawn without replacement]
- ISO 4188 Magnesium and magnesium alloys – Determination of arsenic – Inductively coupled plasma optical emission spectrometric method [rejected draft; original draft with this number unknown]
- ISO 4189 Magnesium and magnesium alloys — Determination of sodium — Inductively coupled plasma optical emission spectrometric method [rejected draft; original draft with this number unknown]
- ISO 4190 Lift (US: Elevator) installation
  - ISO 4190-1:2010 Part 1: Class I, II, III and VI lifts [Withdrawn: replaced with ISO 8100-30]
  - ISO 4190-2:2001 Part 2: Class IV lifts
  - ISO 4190-3:1982 Part 3: Service lifts class V
  - ISO 4190-5:2006 Part 5: Control devices, signals and additional fittings
  - ISO 4190-6:1984 Part 6: Passenger lifts to be installed in residential buildings — Planning and selection [Withdrawn: replaced with ISO 8100-32]
- ISO/TR 4191:2014 Plastics piping systems for water supply — Unplasticized poly(vinyl chloride)(PVC-U) and oriented PVC-U (PVC-O) — Guidance for installation
- ISO 4192:1981 Aluminium and aluminium alloys — Determination of lead content — Flame atomic absorption spectrometric method
- ISO 4193:1981 Aluminium and aluminium alloys — Determination of chromium content — Flame atomic absorption spectrometric method
- ISO 4194:1981 Magnesium alloys — Determination of zinc content — Flame atomic absorption spectrometric method
- ISO 4195:2012 Conveyor belts with heat-resistant rubber covers — Heat resistance of covers — Requirements and test methods
- ISO 4196:1984 Graphical symbols — Use of arrows [Withdrawn: replaced with ISO 80416-2]
- ISO 4197:1989 Equipment for working the soil — Hoe blades — Fixing dimensions
- ISO 4198:1984 Surface active agents — Detergents for hand dishwashing — Guide for comparative testing of performance
- ISO 4199:1979 Plain bearings — Shaft diameters for unsplit bushes [Withdrawn without replacement]
- ISO 4200:1991 Plain end steel tubes, welded and seamless — General tables of dimensions and masses per unit length
- ISO 4201 Oil and gas Industries including lower carbon energy — Flame arresters [original draft with this number unknown]
  - ISO 4201-1 Part 1: Design, fabrication, and qualification
  - ISO 4201-2 Part 2: Selection, applications, and maintenance
- ISO 4202:2016 Reduction sleeves with external 7/24 taper for tools with Morse taper shanks
- ISO 4203:1978 Parallel shank tools — Driving tenons and sockets — Dimensions [Withdrawn without replacement]
- ISO 4204:2016 Countersinks, 90°, with Morse taper shanks and detachable pilots
- ISO 4205:2016 Countersinks, 90°, with parallel shanks and solid pilots
- ISO 4206:2016 Counterbores with parallel shanks and solid pilots
- ISO 4207:2016 Counterbores with Morse taper shanks and detachable pilots
- ISO 4208:1977 Detachable pilots for use with counterbores and 90 degrees countersinks — Dimensions
- ISO 4209 Truck and bus tyres and rims (metric series)
  - ISO 4209-1:2001 Part 1: Tyres
  - ISO 4209-2:2020 Part 2: Rims
- ISO 4210 Cycles — Safety requirements for bicycles
  - ISO 4210-1:2014 Part 1: Terms and definitions
  - ISO 4210-2:2015 Part 2: Requirements for city and trekking, young adult, mountain and racing bicycles
  - ISO 4210-3:2014 Part 3: Common test methods
  - ISO 4210-4:2014 Part 4: Braking test methods
  - ISO 4210-5:2014 Part 5: Steering test methods
  - ISO 4210-6:2015 Part 6: Frame and fork test methods
  - ISO 4210-7:2014 Part 7: Wheels and rims test methods
  - ISO 4210-8:2014 Part 8: Pedal and drive system test methods
  - ISO 4210-9:2014 Part 9: Saddles and seat-post test methods
- ISO 4211 Furniture — Tests for surface finishes
  - ISO 4211-1:2025 Part 1: Assessment of resistance to cold liquids
  - ISO 4211-2:2013 Part 2: Assessment of resistance to wet heat
  - ISO 4211-3:2013 Part 3: Assessment of resistance to dry heat
  - ISO 4211-4:1988 Part 4: Assessment of resistance to impact
  - ISO 4211-5:2021 Part 5: Assessment of resistance to abrasion
- ISO 4212:2023 Corrosion of Metals and Alloys — Method of oxalic acid etching test for intergranular corrosion of austenitic stainless steel [original draft with this number unknown]
- ISO/IEC TS 4213:2022 Information technology — Artificial Intelligence — Assessment of machine learning classification performance [original draft with this number unknown]
- ISO 4214:2022 Milk and milk products — Determination of amino acids in infant and adult/paediatric nutritional formulas and other dairy products [original draft with this number unknown]
- ISO 4215:2022 Corrosion of metals and alloys — Test method for high-temperature corrosion testing of metallic materials by thermogravimetry under isothermal or cyclic conditions [original draft with this number unknown]
- ISO 4216:2021 Thermosetting resin and UV curable resin — Determination of shrinkage by continuous measurement method [original draft with this number unknown]
- ISO 4217:2015 Codes for the representation of currencies
- ISO 4218 Printing machines — Vocabulary
  - ISO 4218-1:1979 Part 1: Fundamental terms
- ISO 4219:1979 Air quality — Determination of gaseous sulphur compounds in ambient air — Sampling equipment
- ISO 4220:1983 Ambient air — Determination of a gaseous acid air pollution index — Titrimetric method with indicator or potentiometric end-point detection
- ISO 4221:1980 Air quality — Determination of mass concentration of sulphur dioxide in ambient air — Thorin spectrophotometric method
- ISO 4222 Ambient air — Measurement of particulate fall-out — Horizontal deposit gauge method [Rejected draft]
- ISO 4223 Definitions of some terms used in the tyre industry
  - ISO 4223-1:2017 Part 1: Pneumatic tyres
  - ISO 4223-2:1991 Part 2: Solid tyres
- ISO 4224:2000 Ambient air — Determination of carbon monoxide — Non-dispersive infrared spectrometric method
- ISO 4225:2020 Air quality – General aspects – Vocabulary
- ISO 4226:2007 Air quality – General aspects – Units of measurement
- ISO/TR 4227:1989 Planning of ambient air quality monitoring
- ISO 4228:1986 Spanners and wrenches — Spline drive ends for power socket wrenches
- ISO 4229:2017 Assembly tools for screws and nuts — Single-head engineer's wrenches for lower torque applications — Maximum outside dimensions of heads and test torques
- ISO 4230:2016 Hand- and machine-operated circular screwing dies for taper pipe threads — R series
- ISO 4231:2016 Hand- and machine-operated circular screwing dies for parallel pipe threads — G series
- ISO 4232 Office machines – Minimum information to be included in specification sheets
  - ISO 4232-1:1979 Part 1: Duplicators [Withdrawn without replacement]
  - ISO 4232-2:1980 Part 2: Document copying machines
  - ISO 4232-3:1984 Part 3: Postal franking machines [Withdrawn without replacement]
- ISO 4233:2023 Hot helium leak testing method for high temperature pressure-bearing components in nuclear fusion reactors [original draft with this number unknown]
- ISO/TR 4234:2026 Non-active surgical implants — Implant coating — Best practices for coating system assessment [original draft with this number unknown]
- ISO 4238:1976 Cinematography — Optical printing ratios for enlargement and reduction of motion-picture film images — Specifications
- ISO 4240 Fine bubble technology — Environmental applications [original draft with this number unknown, but relates to Cinematography]
  - ISO/TS 4240-1:2023 Part 1: Inspection method using online particle counter in dissolved air flotation (DAF) plant
  - ISO 4240-2:2024 Part 2: Test method for evaluating aeration performance of fine bubble jet devices
  - ISO 4240-3 Part 3: Test method for on-site evaluation of the performance of algae bloom removal facilities [Under development]
  - ISO 4240-4 Part 4: Test method for the removal of oil from soil by washing using fine bubbles [Under development]
  - ISO 4240-5 Part 5: Test method for the removal of heavy metals from soil by washing using fine bubbles [Under development]
- ISO 4241:2019 Cinematography — Projection film leader (time-based), trailer and cue marks — Specifications
- ISO 4242:1980 Cinematography — Recording head gaps for two sound records on 16 mm magnetic film — Positions and width dimensions
- ISO 4243:1979 Cinematography — Picture image area and photographic sound record on 16 mm motion-picture release prints — Positions and dimensions
- ISO 4244:1979 Cinematography — Photographic sound record on 8 mm Type S motion-picture prints — Position and width dimensions [Withdrawn without replacement]
- ISO 4245 Cinematography — Projector usage of 16 mm motion-picture films for direct front projection — Specifications [Draft numbered as ISO 26, which the draft was a revision of]
- ISO 4246:1994 Cinematography – Vocabulary
- ISO 4247:1977 Jig bushes and accessories for drilling purposes — Dimensions [Withdrawn without replacement]
- ISO 4248:1978 Jig bushes – Definitions and nomenclature
- ISO 4249 Motorcycle tyres and rims (Code-designated series)
  - ISO 4249-1:1985 Part 1: Tyres
  - ISO 4249-2:1990 Part 2: Tyre load ratings
  - ISO 4249-3:2010 Part 3: Rims
- ISO 4250 Earth-mover tyres and rims
  - ISO 4250-1:2017 Part 1: Tyre designation and dimensions
  - ISO 4250-2:2017 Part 2: Loads and inflation pressures
  - ISO 4250-3:2020 Part 3: Rims
- ISO 4251 Code designated diagonal tyres (ply rating marked series) for agricultural tractors, trailers and machines
  - ISO 4251-1:2019 Part 1: Tyre designation and dimensions, and approved rim contours
  - ISO 4251-2:2019 Part 2: Tyre load ratings
  - ISO 4251-3:2006 Part 3: Rims [Withdrawn: replaced with ISO 18804]
  - ISO 4251-4:2010 Part 4: Tyre classification and nomenclature [Withdrawn without replacement]
  - ISO 4251-5:1992 Part 5: Logging and forestry service tyres [Withdrawn: replaced with ISO 18807]
- ISO 4252:2007 Agricultural tractors — Operator's workplace, access and exit — Dimensions
- ISO 4253:1993 Agricultural tractors — Operator's seating accommodation — Dimensions
- ISO 4254 Agricultural machinery — Safety
  - ISO 4254-1:2013 Part 1: General requirements
  - ISO 4254-2:1986 Part 2: Anhydrous ammonia applicators [Withdrawn without replacement]
  - ISO 4254-3:1992 Part 3: Tractors [Withdrawn: replaced with ISO 26322-(1,2)]
  - ISO 4254-4:1990 Part 4: Forestry winches [Withdrawn: replaced by ISO 19472]
  - ISO 4254-5:2018 Part 5: Power-driven soil-working machines
  - ISO 4254-6:2020 Part 6: Sprayers and liquid fertilizer distributors
  - ISO 4254-7:2017 Part 7: Combine harvesters, forage harvesters, cotton harvesters and sugar cane harvesters
  - ISO 4254-8:2018 Part 8: Solid fertilizer distributors
  - ISO 4254-9:2018 Part 9: Seed drills
  - ISO 4254-10:2009 Part 10: Rotary tedders and rakes
  - ISO 4254-11:2010 Part 11: Pick-up balers
  - ISO 4254-12:2012 Part 12: Rotary disc and drum mowers and flail mowers
  - ISO 4254-13:2012 Part 13: Large rotary mowers
  - ISO 4254-14:2016 Part 14: Bale wrappers
  - ISO 4254-15 Part 15: Row-crop flail mowers [Abandoned draft]
  - ISO 4254-16:2018 Part 16: Portable agricultural grain augers
  - ISO 4254-17:2022 Part 17: Root crop harvesters
- ISO 4255:2025 Fine ceramics (advanced ceramics, advanced technical ceramics) — Mechanical properties of ceramic composites at high temperature — Determination of axial tensile properties of tubes [Original draft with this number unknown]
- ISO 4256:1996 Liquefied petroleum gases — Determination of gauge vapour pressure — LPG method
- ISO 4257:2001 Liquefied petroleum gases — Method of sampling
- ISO 4259 Petroleum and related products — Precision of measurement methods and results
  - ISO 4259-1:2017 Part 1: Determination of precision data in relation to methods of test
  - ISO 4259-2:2017 Part 2: Interpretation and application of precision data in relation to methods of test
  - ISO 4259-3:2020 Part 3: Monitoring and verification of published precision data in relation to methods of test
  - ISO 4259-4:2021 Part 4: Use of statistical control charts to validate 'in-statistical-control' status for the execution of a standard test method in a single laboratory
- ISO 4260:1987 Petroleum products and hydrocarbons — Determination of sulfur content — Wickbold combustion method [Withdrawn without replacement]
- ISO 4261:2013 Petroleum products — Fuels (class F) — Specifications of gas turbine fuels for industrial and marine applications
- ISO 4262:1993 Petroleum products — Determination of carbon residue — Ramsbottom method
- ISO 4263 Petroleum and related products — Determination of the ageing behaviour of inhibited oils and fluids — TOST test
  - ISO 4263-1:2003 Part 1: Procedure for mineral oils
  - ISO 4263-2:2003 Part 2: Procedure for category HFC hydraulic fluids
  - ISO 4263-3:2015 Part 3: Anhydrous procedure for synthetic hydraulic fluids
  - ISO 4263-4:2006 Part 4: Procedure for industrial gear oils
- ISO 4264:2018 Petroleum products — Calculation of cetane index of middle-distillate fuels by the four variable equation
- ISO 4265:1986 Petroleum products — Lubricating oils and additives — Determination of phosphorus content — Quinoline phosphomolybdate method [Withdrawn without replacement]
- ISO 4266 Petroleum and liquid petroleum products — Measurement of level and temperature in storage tanks by automatic methods
  - ISO 4266-1:2002 Part 1: Measurement of level in atmospheric tanks
  - ISO 4266-2:2002 Part 2: Measurement of level in marine vessels
  - ISO 4266-3:2002 Part 3: Measurement of level in pressurized storage tanks (non-refrigerated)
  - ISO 4266-4:2002 Part 4: Measurement of temperature in atmospheric tanks
  - ISO 4266-5:2002 Part 5: Measurement of temperature in marine vessels
  - ISO 4266-6:2002 Part 6: Measurement of temperature in pressurized storage tanks (non-refrigerated)
- ISO 4267 Petroleum and liquid petroleum products — Calculation of oil quantities
  - ISO 4267-1 Part 1: Static measurement [Rejected draft]
  - ISO 4267-2:1988 Part 2: Dynamic measurement
- ISO 4268:2000 Petroleum and liquid petroleum products — Temperature measurements — Manual methods
- ISO 4269:2001 Petroleum and liquid petroleum products — Tank calibration by liquid measurement — Incremental method using volumetric meters
- ISO 4270 Petroleum products – Determination of density and relative density – Reischauer pyknometer method [Rejected draft]
- ISO 4271 Petroleum products – Determination of density and relative density – Conical pyknometer method [Rejected draft]
- ISO 4272:2022 Intelligent transport systems — Truck platooning systems (TPS) — Functional and operational requirements [Original draft with this number unknown]
- ISO 4273:2024 Intelligent transport systems — Automated braking during low speed manoeuvring (ABLS) — Requirements and test procedures [Original draft with this number unknown]
- ISO 4274:1977 Urea for industrial use — Determination of biuret content — Flame atomic absorption and photometric absorption methods [Withdrawn without replacement]
- ISO 4275:1977 Ammonium hydrogen carbonate for industrial use (including foodstuffs) — Determination of arsenic content — Silver diethyldithiocarbamate photometric method [Withdrawn without replacement]
- ISO 4276:1978 Anhydrous ammonia for industrial use — Evaluation of residue on evaporation — Gravimetric method [Withdrawn without replacement]
- ISO/TR 4277:2009 Cryolite, natural and artificial — Conventional test for evaluation of free fluorides content
- ISO 4278:1977 Sodium fluoride for industrial use — Determination of carbonate content — Gravimetric method [Withdrawn without replacement]
- ISO 4279:1977 Aluminium fluoride for industrial use — Determination of sodium content — Flame emission spectrophotometric method [Withdrawn without replacement]
- ISO 4280:1977 Cryolite, natural and artificial, and aluminium fluoride for industrial use — Determination of sulphate content — Barium sulphate gravimetric method
- ISO 4281:1977 Sodium hexafluorosilicate for industrial use — Determination of free acidity and total hexafluorosilicate content — Titrimetric method
- ISO 4282:1992 Acid-grade and ceramic-grade fluorspar — Determination of loss in mass at 105 degrees C [Withdrawn without replacement]
- ISO 4283:1993 All grades of fluorspar — Determination of carbonate content — Titrimetric method [Withdrawn without replacement]
- ISO 4284:1993 Acid-grade and ceramic-grade fluorspar — Determination of sulfide content — Iodometric method [Withdrawn without replacement]
- ISO 4285:1977 Phosphoric acid for industrial use — Guide to sampling techniques
- ISO 4286:2021 Intelligent transport systems — Use cases for sharing of probe data [Original draft with this number unknown]
- ISO 4287:1997 Geometrical Product Specifications (GPS) – Surface texture: Profile method – Terms, definitions and surface texture parameters [Withdrawn: replaced with ISO 21920-2]
- ISO 4288:1996 Geometrical Product Specifications (GPS) – Surface texture: Profile method – Rules and procedures for the assessment of surface texture [Withdrawn: replaced with ISO 21920-3]
- ISO 4289:2023 High velocity oxygen fuel (HVOF) cermet coatings for metallurgical roll components — Guidance with requirements [original draft was Instruments for the measurement of surface roughness by the profile method contact (stylus) instruments of consecutive profile transformation - Profile recording instruments calibration and means]
- ISO 4290 Agricultural wheeled tractors and attachments — Front loaders — Dimensional and operational ratings [Rejected draft; original draft with this number unknown]
- ISO 4291:1985 Methods for the assessment of departure from roundness – Measurement of variations in radius
- ISO 4292:1985 Methods for the assessment of departure from roundness — Measurement by two- and three-point methods [Withdrawn without replacement]
- ISO 4293:1982 Manganese ores and concentrates — Determination of phosphorus content — Extraction-molybdovanadate photometric method
- ISO 4294:1984 Manganese ores and concentrates — Determination of copper content — Extraction-spectrometric and spectrometric methods [Withdrawn without replacement]
- ISO 4295:1988 Manganese ores and concentrates — Determination of aluminium content — Photometric and gravimetric methods
- ISO 4296 Manganese ores — Sampling
  - ISO 4296-1:1984 Part 1: Increment sampling
  - ISO 4296-2:1983 Part 2: Preparation of samples
- ISO 4297:1978 Manganese ores and concentrates — Methods of chemical analysis — General instructions
- ISO 4298:1984 Manganese ores and concentrates — Determination of manganese content — Potentiometric method
- ISO 4299:1989 Manganese ores — Determination of moisture content
- ISO 4300:1984 Manganese ores and concentrates — Determination of lead content — Polarographic methods [Withdrawn without replacement]
- ISO 4301 Cranes – Classification
  - ISO 4301-1:2016 Part 1: General
  - ISO 4301-2:2020 Part 2: Mobile cranes
  - ISO 4301-3:2021 Part 3: Tower cranes
  - ISO 4301-4:1989 Part 4: Jib cranes
  - ISO 4301-5:1991 Part 5: Overhead travelling and portal bridge cranes
- ISO 4302:2016 Cranes — Wind load assessment
- ISO 4304:1987 Cranes other than mobile and floating cranes — General requirements for stability [Withdrawn without replacement]
- ISO 4305:2014 Mobile cranes — Determination of stability
- ISO 4306 Cranes – Vocabulary
  - ISO 4306-1:2007 Part 1: General
  - ISO 4306-2:2012 Part 2: Mobile cranes
  - ISO 4306-3:2016 Part 3: Tower cranes
  - ISO 4306-4:2020 Part 4: Jib cranes
  - ISO 4306-5:2005 Part 5: Bridge and gantry cranes
- ISO 4307:2021 Molecular in vitro diagnostic examinations — Specifications for pre-examination processes for saliva — Isolated human DNA [Original draft with this number was related to cranes]
- ISO 4308 Cranes and lifting appliances — Selection of wire ropes
  - ISO 4308-1:2003 Part 1: General [Withdrawn: replaced with ISO 16625]
  - ISO 4308-2:1988 Part 2: Mobile cranes — Coefficient of utilization [Withdrawn: replaced with ISO 16625]
- ISO 4309:2017 Cranes — Wire ropes — Care and maintenance, inspection and discard
- ISO 4310:2009 Cranes — Test code and procedures
- ISO 4311:1979 Anionic and non-ionic surface active agents — Determination of the critical micellization concentration — Method by measuring surface tension with a plate, stirrup or ring
- ISO 4312:1989 Surface active agents — Evaluation of certain effects of laundering — Methods of analysis and test for unsoiled cotton control cloth
- ISO 4313:1976 Washing powders — Determination of total phosphorus(V) oxide content — Quinoline phosphomolybdate gravimetric method
- ISO 4314:1977 Surface active agents — Determination of free alkalinity or free acidity — Titrimetric method
- ISO 4315:1977 Surface active agents — Determination of alkalinity — Titrimetric method
- ISO 4316:1977 Surface active agents — Determination of pH of aqueous solutions — Potentiometric method
- ISO 4317:2011 Surface-active agents and detergents — Determination of water content — Karl Fischer methods
- ISO 4318:1989 Surface active agents and soaps — Determination of water content — Azeotropic distillation method
- ISO 4319:1977 Surface active agents — Detergents for washing fabrics — Guide for comparative testing of performance
- ISO 4320:1977 Non-ionic surface active agents — Determination of cloud point index — Volumetric method
- ISO 4321:1977 Washing powders — Determination of active oxygen content — Titrimetric method
- ISO 4322:1977 Non-ionic surface active agents — Determination of sulphated ash — Gravimetric method
- ISO 4323:2018 Soaps — Determination of chloride content — Potentiometric method
- ISO 4324:1977 Surface active agents — Powders and granules — Measurement of the angle of repose
- ISO 4325:1990 Soaps and detergents — Determination of chelating agent content — Titrimetric method
- ISO 4326:1980 Non-ionic surface active agents — Polyethoxylated derivatives — Determination of hydroxyl value — Acetic anhydride method
- ISO 4327:1979 Non-ionic surface active agents — Polyalkoxylated derivatives — Determination of hydroxyl value — Phthalic anhydride method
- ISO 4328 Centre holes [Rejected draft]
- ISO 4329 Shaft ends with woodruff keys [Rejected draft]
- ISO 4330:1994 Photography — Determination of the curl of photographic film and paper [Withdrawn: replaced with ISO 18910]
- ISO 4331:1986 Photography — Processed photographic black-and-white film for archival records — Silver-gelatin type on cellulose ester base — Specifications [Withdrawn: replaced with ISO 10602, now replaced with ISO 18901]
- ISO 4332:1986 Photography — Processed photographic black-and-white film for archival records — Silver-gelatin type on poly(ethylene terephthalate) base — Specifications [Withdrawn: replaced with ISO 10602, now replaced with ISO 18901]
- ISO 4333:2022 Textiles — Determination of reduction activity of specific proteins derived from pollen, mite and other sources on textile products [original draft with this number unknown]
- ISO 4334 Fruit puree — Specifications and test methods [Rejected draft; original draft with this number unknown]
- ISO/IEC 4335:1993 Information technology —- Telecommunications and information exchange between systems — High-level data link control (HDLC) procedures — Elements of procedures [Withdrawn: replaced with ISO/IEC 13239]
- ISO 4336:1981 Numerical control of machines — Specification of interface signals between the numerical control unit and the electrical equipment of an NC machine [Withdrawn without replacement]
- ISO 4337:1977 Information processing – Interchangeable magnetic twelve-disk pack (100 Mbytes) [Withdrawn without replacement]
- ISO 4338 Information processing – Magnetic tape cassette [Rejected draft; a later proposed draft, Conceptual model and system architecture of smart classroom, was deleted in 2021]
- ISO 4339:2022 Information technology for learning, education and training — Reference model for information and communications technology (ICT) evaluation in education [Original draft with this number related to Information processing]
- ISO/TR 4340:2022 Water aggressiveness evaluation and optimized lining choice [Original draft with this number related to Information processing]
- ISO 4341:1978 Information processing – Magnetic tape cassette and cartridge labelling and file structure for information interchange
- ISO 4342:1985 Numerical control of machines — NC processor input — Basic part program reference language
- ISO 4343:2000 Industrial automation systems — Numerical control of machines — NC processor output — Post processor commands
- ISO 4344:2004 Steel wire ropes for lifts — Minimum requirements
- ISO 4345:1988 Steel wire ropes — Fibre main cores — Specification
- ISO 4346:1977 Steel wire ropes for general purposes – Lubricants – Basic requirements
- ISO 4347:2015 Leaf chains, clevises and sheaves — Dimensions, measuring forces, tensile strengths and dynamic strengths
- ISO 4348:1983 Flat-top chains and associated chain wheels for conveyors [Withdrawn without replacement]
- ISO 4349:2023 Solid recovered fuels — Determination of the recycling index for co-processing [Original draft with this number was General principles for the verification of safety of concrete structures]
- ISO 4351:2023 Geometrical product specifications (GPS) — Association [original draft with this number unknown]
- ISO 4354:2009 Wind actions on structures
- ISO 4355:2013 Bases for design of structures — Determination of snow loads on roofs
- ISO 4356:1977 Bases for the design of structures — Deformations of buildings at the serviceability limit states [Withdrawn without replacement]
- ISO 4357 Rules for use of the I.S. system of units in buildings [Rejected draft]
- ISO 4358:2023 Test methods for civil multi-copter unmanned aircraft system [Original draft with this number unknown]
- ISO 4359:2013 Flow measurement structures – Rectangular, trapezoidal and U-shaped flumes
- ISO 4360:2020 Hydrometry – Open channel flow measurement using triangular profile weirs
- ISO 4361 Liquid flow measurement in open channels by weirs and flumes – Round nosed broad crested weirs [Rejected draft]
- ISO 4362:1999 Hydrometric determinations – Flow measurement in open channels using structures – Trapezoidal broad-crested weirs
- ISO 4363:2002 Measurement of liquid flow in open channels – Methods for measurement of characteristics of suspended sediment
- ISO 4364:1997 Measurement of liquid flow in open channels – Bed material sampling
- ISO 4365:2005 Liquid flow in open channels – Sediment in streams and canals – Determination of concentration, particle size distribution and relative density
- ISO 4366:2007 Hydrometry – Echo sounders for water depth measurements
- ISO 4369:1979 Measurement of liquid flow in open channels – Moving-boat method
- ISO 4370:2022 Environmental life cycle assessment and recycling of ductile iron pipes for water applications [Original draft with this number unknown]
- ISO 4371:1984 Measurement of liquid flow in open channels by weirs and flumes – End depth method for estimation of flow in non-rectangular channels with a free overfall (approximate method) [Withdrawn: replaced with ISO 18481]
- ISO 4373:2022 Hydrometry – Water level measuring devices
- ISO 4374:1990 Liquid flow measurement in open channels – Round-nose horizontal broad-crested weirs
- ISO 4375:2014 Hydrometry – Cableway systems for stream gauging
- ISO 4376:2024 Cycle Energy Requirement — Test method [Original draft with this number unknown]
- ISO 4377:2012 Hydrometric determinations – Flow measurement in open channels using structures – Flat-V weirs
- ISO 4378 Plain bearings – Terms, definitions, classification and symbols
  - ISO 4378-1:2017 Part 1: Design, bearing materials and their properties
  - ISO 4378-2:2017 Part 2: Friction and wear
  - ISO 4378-3:2017 Part 3: Lubrication
  - ISO 4378-4:2009 Part 4: Basic symbols
  - ISO 4378-5:2009 Part 5: Application of symbols
  - ISO/TR 4378-6:2012 Part 6: Abbreviated terms
- ISO 4379:2018 Plain bearings — Copper alloy bushes
- ISO 4380 Plain bearings – Method of calculation of hydrodynamic thrust bearings (Rejected draft; now covered by ISO 12131-1)
- ISO 4381:2011 Plain bearings — Tin casting alloys for multilayer plain bearings
- ISO 4382 Plain bearings — Copper alloys
  - ISO 4382-1:2021 Part 1: Cast copper alloys for solid and multilayer thick-walled plain bearings
  - ISO 4382-2:2021 Part 2: Wrought copper alloys for solid plain bearings
- ISO 4383:2012 Plain bearings — Multilayer materials for thin-walled plain bearings
- ISO 4384 Plain bearings — Hardness testing of bearing metals
  - ISO 4384-1:2019 Part 1: Multilayer bearings materials
  - ISO 4384-2:2022 Part 2: Solid materials
- ISO 4385:1981 Plain bearings — Compression testing of metallic bearing materials
- ISO 4386 Plain bearings — Metallic multilayer plain bearings
  - ISO 4386-1:2019 Part 1: Non-destructive ultrasonic testing of bond of thickness greater than or equal to 0,5 mm
  - ISO 4386-3:2019 Part 2: Destructive testing of bond for bearing metal layer thicknesses greater than or equal to 2 mm
- ISO 4387:2019 Cigarettes — Determination of total and nicotine-free dry particulate matter using a routine analytical smoking machine
- ISO 4388:1991 Cigarettes — Determination of the smoke condensate retention index of a filter — Direct spectrometric method
- ISO 4389:2000 Tobacco and tobacco products — Determination of organochlorine pesticide residues — Gas chromatographic method
- ISO 4391:1983 Hydraulic fluid power — Pumps, motors and integral transmissions — Parameter definitions and letter symbols
- ISO 4392 Hydraulic fluid power — Determination of characteristics of motors
  - ISO 4392-1:2002 Part 1: At constant low speed and constant pressure
  - ISO 4392-2:2002 Part 2: Startability
  - ISO 4392-3:1993 Part 3: At constant flow and at constant torque
- ISO 4393:2015 Fluid power systems and components — Cylinders — Basic series of piston strokes
- ISO 4394 Fluid power systems and components — Cylinder barrels
  - ISO 4394-1:1980 Part 1: Requirements for steel tubes with specially finished bores [Withdrawn without replacement]
- ISO 4395:2009 Fluid power systems and components — Cylinder piston rod end types and dimensions
- ISO 4396 Telecommunications and information exchange between systems — Recursive inter-network architecture [Original DPR with this number related to fluid power]
  - ISO 4396-1:2023 Part 1: Reference model
  - ISO 4396-2:2023 Part 2: Common application connection establishment procedure
  - ISO 4396-3:2023 Part 3: Common distributed application protocol
  - ISO 4396-4:2023 Part 4: Complete enrolment procedures
  - ISO 4396-5:2023 Part 5: Incremental enrolment procedures
  - ISO 4396-6:2023 Part 6: RINA data transfer service
  - ISO 4396-7:2023 Part 7: Flow allocator
  - ISO 4396-8:2023 Part 8: RINA general delimiting procedures
  - ISO 4396-9:2023 Part 9: Error and flow control protocol
- ISO 4397:2011 Fluid power connectors and associated components — Nominal outside diameters of tubes and nominal hose sizes
- ISO/TS 4398:2022 Intelligent transport systems — Guided transportation service planning data exchange [Original DPR with this number related to fluid power]
- ISO 4399:2019 Fluid power systems and components — Connectors and associated components — Nominal pressures
- ISO 4400:1994 Fluid power systems and components — Three-pin electrical plug connectors with earth contact — Characteristics and requirements
- ISO 4401:2005 Hydraulic fluid power — Four-port directional control valves — Mounting surfaces
- ISO 4402:1991 Hydraulic fluid power — Calibration of automatic-count instruments for particles suspended in liquids — Method using classified AC Fine Test Dust contaminant [Withdrawn: replaced with ISO 11171]
- ISO 4404 Petroleum and related products — Determination of the corrosion resistance of fire-resistant hydraulic fluids
- ISO 4404-1:2012 Part 1: Water-containing fluids
- ISO 4404-2:2010 Part 2: Non-aqueous fluids
- ISO 4405:2022 Hydraulic fluid power — Fluid contamination — Determination of particulate contamination by the gravimetric method
- ISO 4406:2021 Hydraulic fluid power — Fluids — Method for coding the level of contamination by solid particles
- ISO 4407:2002 Hydraulic fluid power — Fluid contamination — Determination of particulate contamination by the counting method using an optical microscope
- ISO 4408 Hydraulic fluid power — Fluid contamination — Determination of particulate contamination by the counting method under incident light [Abandoned draft]
- ISO 4409:2019 Hydraulic fluid power — Positive-displacement pumps, motors and integral transmissions — Methods of testing and presenting basic steady state performance
- ISO 4410:2023 Test methods for the experimental characterization of in-plane permeability of fibrous reinforcements for liquid composite moulding [original draft with this number unknown]
- ISO 4411:2019 Hydraulic fluid power — Valves — Determination of differential pressure/flow rate characteristics
- ISO 4412 Hydraulic fluid power – Test code for determination of airborne noise levels
  - ISO 4412-1:1991 Part 1: Pumps
  - ISO 4412-2:1991 Part 2: Motors
  - ISO 4412-3:1991 Part 3: Pumps – Method using a parallelepiped microphone array
- ISO 4413:2010 Hydraulic fluid power – General rules and safety requirements for systems and their components
- ISO 4414:2010 Pneumatic fluid power — General rules and safety requirements for systems and their components
- ISO 4415:1981 Size designation of clothes — Men's and boys' underwear, nightwear and shirts [Withdrawn: replaced with ISO 8559-2]
- ISO 4416:1981 Size designation of clothes — Women's and girls' underwear, nightwear, foundation garments and shirts [Withdrawn: replaced with ISO 8559-2]
- ISO 4417:1977 Size designation of clothes — Headwear [Withdrawn: replaced with ISO 8559-2]
- ISO 4418:1978 Size designation of clothes — Gloves [Withdrawn: replaced with ISO 8559-2]
- ISO/TR 4419:2026 Health informatics — Pathways for human-computer interaction in electronic health information record systems to reduce clinician burden [Original draft with this number unknown]
- ISO 4420 Fluid power control components [Rejected draft]
- ISO/TR 4421:2023 Health informatics — Introduction to Ayurveda informatics [Original draft with this number unknown]
- ISO 4422 Pipes and fittings made of unplasticized poly(vinyl chloride) (PVC-U) for water supply — Specifications
  - ISO 4422-1:1996 Part 1: General [Withdrawn: replaced with ISO 1452-1]
  - ISO 4422-2:1996 Part 2: Pipes (with or without integral sockets) [Withdrawn: replaced with ISO 1452-2]
  - ISO 4422-3:1996 Part 3: Fittings and joints [Withdrawn: replaced with ISO 1452-3]
  - ISO 4422-4:1996 Part 4: Valves and ancillary equipment [Withdrawn: replaced with ISO 1452-4]
  - ISO 4422-5:1996 Part 5: Fitness for purpose of the system [Withdrawn: replaced with ISO 1452-5]
- ISO/TS 4424:2023 Genomics Informatics— Data elements and their metadata for describing the tumor mutation burden (TMB) information of clinical massive parallel DNA Sequencing [original draft with this number unknown]
- ISO/TS 4425:2023 Genomics Informatics — Data elements and their metadata for describing the microsatellite instability (MSI) information of clinical massive parallel DNA sequencing [original draft with this number unknown]
- ISO 4426:2021 Intelligent transport systems — Lower layer protocols for usage in the European digital tachograph [Original draft with this number unknown]
- ISO 4434:1977 Unplasticized polyvinyl chloride (PVC) adaptor fittings for pipes under pressure — Laying length and size of threads — Metric series [Withdrawn: replaced with ISO 1452-3]
- ISO 4469:1981 Wood — Determination of radial and tangential shrinkage [Withdrawn: replaced with ISO 13061-13]
- ISO 4481:1977 Cutlery and flatware – Nomenclature

== ISO 4500 - ISO 4999 ==
- ISO 4548 Methods of test for full-flow lubricating oil filters for internal combustion engines
  - ISO 4548-7:2012 Part 7: Vibration fatigue test
- ISO 4551:1987 Ferroalloys – Sampling and sieve analysis
- ISO 4552 Ferroalloys – Sampling and sample preparation for chemical analysis
  - ISO 4552-1:1987 Part 1: Ferrochromium, ferrosilicochromium, ferrosilicon, ferrosilicomanganese, ferromanganese
  - ISO 4552-2:1987 Part 2: Ferrotitanium, ferromolybdenum, ferrotungsten, ferroniobium, ferrovanadium
- ISO 4570 Tyre valve threads
- ISO 4578 Adhesives — Determination of peel resistance of high-strength adhesive bonds — Floating-roller method
- ISO 4582 Plastics — Determination of changes in colour and variations in properties after exposure to daylight under glass, natural weathering or laboratory light sources
- ISO 4587 Adhesives — Determination of tensile lap-shear strength of rigid-to-rigid bonded assemblies
- ISO 4618:2014 Paints and varnishes – Terms and definitions
- ISO 4628 Paints and varnishes – Evaluation of degradation of coatings – Designation of quantity and size of defects, and of intensity of uniform changes in appearance
  - ISO 4628-1 General introduction and designation system
  - ISO 4628-2 Assessment of degree of blistering
  - ISO 4628-3 Assessment of degree of rusting
  - ISO 4628-4 Assessment of degree of cracking
  - ISO 4628-5 Assessment of degree of flaking
  - ISO 4628-6 Assessment of degree of chalking by tape method
  - ISO 4628-7 Assessment of degree of chalking by velvet method
  - ISO 4628-8 Assessment of degree of delamination and corrosion around a scribe
  - ISO 4628-10 Assessment of degree of filiform corrosion
- ISO 4648:1991 Rubber, vulcanized or thermoplastic — Determination of dimensions of test pieces and products for test purposes [Withdrawn: replaced with ISO 23529]
- ISO 4661 Rubber, vulcanized — Preparation of samples and test pieces
  - ISO 4661-1:1993 Rubber, vulcanized or thermoplastic — Preparation of samples and test pieces — Part 1: Physical tests [Withdrawn: replaced with ISO 23529]
  - ISO 4661-2:2018 Rubber, vulcanized — Preparation of samples and test pieces — Part 2: Chemical tests
- ISO 4683 Raw sheep skins
  - ISO 4683-1:1998 Part 1: Descriptions of defects
- ISO 4720:2009 Essential oils – Nomenclature
- ISO 4730:2017 Essential oil of Melaleuca, terpinen-4-ol type (Tea Tree oil)
- ISO 4786:1977 Enclosed-scale adjustable-range thermometers [Withdrawn without replacement]
- ISO 4787:2010 Laboratory glassware – Volumetric instruments – Methods for testing of capacity and for use
- ISO 4788:2005 Laboratory glassware – Graduated measuring cylinders
- ISO 4791 Laboratory apparatus – Vocabulary relating to apparatus made essentially from glass, porcelain or vitreous silica
  - ISO 4791-1:1985 Part 1: Names for items of apparatus
- ISO 4795:1996 Glass for thermometer bulbs
- ISO 4801:1979 Glass alcoholometers and alcohol hydrometers not incorporating a thermometer
- ISO 4805:1982 Laboratory glassware – Thermo-alcoholometers and alcohol-thermohydrometers
- ISO 4824:1993 Dentistry — Ceramic denture teeth [Withdrawn: replaced with ISO 22112]
- ISO 4831:2006 Microbiology of food and animal feeding stuffs – Horizontal method for the detection and enumeration of coliforms – Most probable number technique
- ISO 4832:2006 Microbiology of food and animal feeding stuffs – Horizontal method for the enumeration of coliforms – Colony-count technique
- ISO 4833 Microbiology of the food chain – Horizontal method for the enumeration of microorganisms
  - ISO 4833-1:2013 Part 1: Colony count at 30 degrees C by the pour plate technique
  - ISO 4833-2:2013 Part 2: Colony count at 30 degrees C by the surface plating technique
- ISO 4848:1980 Concrete — Determination of air content of freshly mixed concrete — Pressure method [Withdrawn: replaced with ISO 1920-2]
- ISO 4858:1982 Wood — Determination of volumetric shrinkage [Withdrawn: replaced with ISO 13061-14]
- ISO 4859:1982 Wood — Determination of radial and tangential swelling [Withdrawn: replaced with ISO 13061-15]
- ISO 4860:1982 Wood — Determination of volumetric swelling [Withdrawn: replaced with ISO 13061-16]
- ISO 4866:2010 Mechanical vibration and shock – Vibration of fixed structures – Guidelines for the measurement of vibrations and evaluation of their effects on structures
- ISO 4871:1996 Acoustics – Declaration and verification of noise emission values of machinery and equipment
- ISO/IEC 4873:1991 Information technology – ISO 8-bit code for information interchange – Structure and rules for implementation
- ISO 4875 Metal-cutting band saw blades
  - ISO 4875-1:2006 Part 1: Vocabulary
- ISO 4880:1997 Burning behaviour of textiles and textile products – Vocabulary
- ISO 4882:1979 Office machines and data processing equipment – Line spacings and character spacings
- ISO 4885:2017 Ferrous materials – Heat treatments – Vocabulary
- ISO 4892 Plastics – Methods of exposure to laboratory light sources
- ISO 4902:1989 Information technology – Data communication – 37-pole DTE/DCE interface connector and contact number assignments
- ISO 4903:1989 Information technology – Data communication – 15-pole DTE/DCE interface connector and contact number assignments
- ISO/IEC 4909:2006 Identification cards – Financial transaction cards – Magnetic stripe data content for track 3
- ISO 4921:2000 Knitting – Basic concepts – Vocabulary
- ISO/IEC 4922-1 Information security — Secure multiparty computation
  - ISO/IEC 4922-1:2023 Part 1: General
- ISO 4977 Double cold-reduced electrolytic tinplate
  - ISO 4977-1:1984 Part 1: Sheet [Withdrawn: replaced with ISO 11949]
  - ISO 4977-2:1984 Part 2: Coil for subsequent cutting into sheets [Withdrawn: replaced with ISO 11949]

== See also ==
- List of International Organization for Standardization standards, 1–4999
