= Beryozovsky =

Beryozovsky (masculine), Beryozovskaya (feminine), or Beryozovskoye (neuter) may refer to:

- Beryozovsky District, name of several districts in the countries of the former Soviet Union
- Beryozovsky Urban Okrug, name of several urban okrugs in Russia
- Beryozovsky (inhabited locality) (Beryozovskaya, Beryozovskoye), name of several inhabited localities in Russia
- Beryozovskaya GRES, a hydropower station in Russia
- Beryozovskaya mine, a mine in Kuzbass, Russia; near the town of Beryozovsky
- Beryozovskoye, a historical settlement in place of Primorsk, Leningrad Oblast, Russia
- Beryozovskoye deposit, a gold deposit in Russia
- Beryozovskoye, a joint-stock company which manages the Cretaceous steppes with Caragana natural monument in Russia

== See also ==
- Berezovsky
