= Source of Sviyaga River =

The Source of Sviyaga River
- IUCN category III (natural monument or feature)
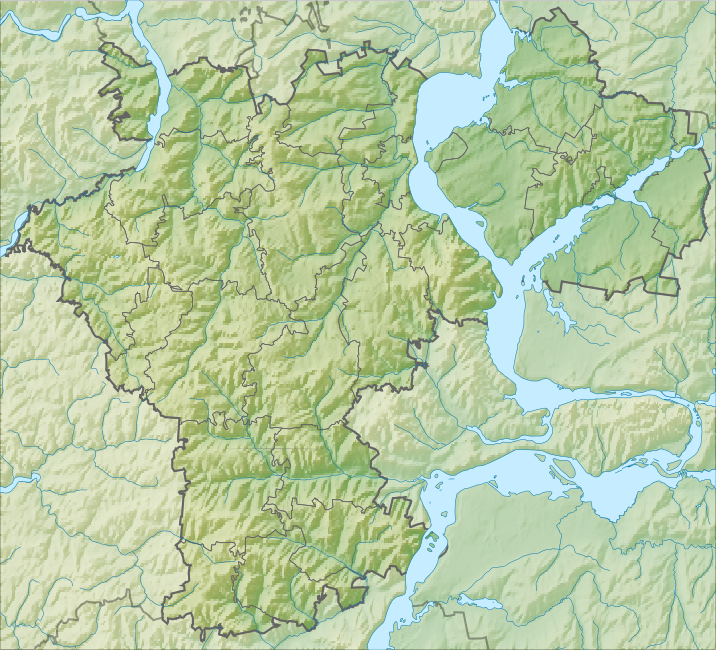
- Location within Ulyanovsk Oblast
- Location: Kuzovatovsky District, Ulyanovsk Oblast, Russia
- Coordinates: 53°31′30″N 47°32′16″E
- Area: 0.0008 km^{2} (0.00031 sq mi)
- Established: 1989

The Source of Sviyaga River (Russian: Исток реки Свияга) is a complex natural hydrological feature listed in the inventory of a protected area of the Ulyanovsk Oblast in Russia.

== Description ==
The Sviyaga River's main source is the most prominent feature of the protected area, with significant conservation and environmental value. It lies about 5 km southwest of Kuzovatovo, where the land rises to 332 m above sea level. At this height the vegetation consists of tall-trunked pines, cowberry shrubs, and bilberry. Various representatives of the pear family are found here: one-sided pear, rotundifolious pear, verdant and small, pipsissewa umbellate, and sometimes a rare orchid plant, neottianta cucullata, can be found. The total area is 8 hectares.

The main source of the Sviyaga River originates from a wood-bog, and is a small pure streamlet which flows into a deep broad gully with hygrophyte vegetation.

The second source is located near the village of Krasnaya Polyana. It is in poor condition due to livestock farming within its boundaries.

The third source is in a better position to the west of the village of Baevka. It originates from a spring on the edge of a pine forest. The currents are strong and the water is clean.

Downstream, three dams divert most of the source's water. Polluting industries have been established near the dams. At the first dam, woodworking enterprises pollute the water. The second dam is cleaner, but on its banks are various industrial buildings. Below the second dam, Sviyaga becomes a small streamlet and then in Kuzovatovo becomes a small river proceeding for some kilometers on wide floodplains. Here the upper part of Sviyaga is deeper because of an abundance of springs from underground aquifers.

== See also ==
- Protected areas of Ulyanovsk Oblast
