= Beryozovsky District, Russia =

Location of Khanty-Mansi Autonomous Okrug in Russia

Location of Krasnoyarsk Krai in Russia

Location of Perm Krai in Russia

Beryozovsky District is the name of several administrative and municipal districts in Russia. The name is generally derived from or related to the root "beryoza" (a birch).

- Beryozovsky District, Khanty-Mansi Autonomous Okrug, an administrative and municipal district of Khanty-Mansi Autonomous Okrug
- Beryozovsky District, Krasnoyarsk Krai, an administrative and municipal district of Krasnoyarsk Krai
- Beryozovsky District, Perm Krai, an administrative and municipal district of Perm Krai

== See also ==
- Beryozovsky (disambiguation)
- Berezovsky
- Beryozovsky Urban Okrug
