= Tetramethylthiuram monosulfide =

Names
- Preferred IUPAC name N^{1},N^{1},N^{3},N^{3}-Tetramethyl-1,2,3-trithiodicarbonic diamide
- Other names N,N,N′,N′-Tetramethylthiuram monosulfide

Identifiers
CAS Number	97-74-5
3D model (JSmol)	Interactive image
ChEMBL	ChEMBL571700
ChemSpider	7070
DrugBank	DB14178
ECHA InfoCard	100.002.369
EC Number	202-605-7
PubChem CID	7347
UNII	01W430XXSQ
CompTox Dashboard (EPA)	DTXSID0021333
- InChI: InChI=1S/C6H12N2S3/c1-7(2)5(9)11-6(10)8(3)4/h1-4H3 Key: REQPQFUJGGOFQL-UHFFFAOYSA-N
- SMILES: CN(C)C(=S)SC(=S)N(C)C

Properties
Chemical formula	C_{6}H_{12}N_{2}S_{3}
Molar mass	208.36 g·mol^{−1}
Density	1.39
Melting point	107 °C (225 °F; 380 K)

Hazards
- GHS labelling
Pictograms	(GHS07: Exclamation mark) (GHS09: Environmental hazard)
Signal word	Warning
Hazard statements	H302, H317, H411
Precautionary statements	P261, P264, P270, P272, P273, P280, P301+P317, P302+P352, P321, P330, P333+P317, P362+P364, P391, P501
- Except where otherwise noted, data are given for materials in their standard state (at 25 °C [77 °F], 100 kPa). Infobox references

Tetramethylthiuram monosulfide is an organosulfur compound with the formula ((CH_{3})_{2}NCS)_{2}S. It is a yellow solid that is soluble in organic solvents. It is the parent member of a large class of thiuram monosulfides. It is used as an activator in the sulfur vulcanization of natural and butyl rubbers.

== Synthesis and structure ==
It is prepared by desulfuration of tetramethylthiuram disulfides with triphenylphosphine or cyanide:

(Me_{2}NCSS)_{2} + PPh_{3} → (Me_{2}NCS)_{2}S + SPPh_{3}

According to X-ray crystallography, the molecule consists of two planar (CH_{3})_{2}NCS subunits joined by a sulfide. The dihedral angle between the subunits is close to 90°.
