= Brzozowski =

Brzozowski (feminine: Brzozowska; plural: Brzozowscy) is a Polish toponymic surname derived from the place name Brzozów, which is itself derived from 'brzoza' ("birch").

In the Russian Empire, the surname was written in Russian variously as Бжозовский, Бржозовский, Бжезовский, Бржезовский, and may accordingly be transliterated as Bzhozovsky, Brzhozovsky, Bzhezovsky, Brzhezovsky. Occasionally it was even translated as Berezovski.

People with the surname include:

- Artur Brzozowski (born 1985), Polish athlete
- Dariusz Brzozowski (born 1980), Polish drummer
- Dorota Brzozowska (born 1964), Polish swimmer
- Edward Brzozowski (1920–1983), Polish football player and manager
- Janusz Brzozowski (disambiguation), multiple people
- Julia Niewiarowska-Brzozowska (1827–1891), Polish composer
- Krystian Brzozowski (born 1982), Polish wrestler
- Krzysztof Brzozowski (born 1993), Polish athlete
- Rafał Brzozowski, Polish singer and TV presenter
- Stanisław Brzozowski (disambiguation), multiple people
- Tadeusz Brzozowski (1749–1820), Polish Jesuit

== See also ==
- Brzozów County (Polish: powiat brzozowski), a territory in south-eastern Poland
- Brzozowski derivative
