= Brazauskas =

- Lithuanian surname
- m.: Brazauskas
- f.: (unmarried): Brazauskaitė
- f.: (married): Brazauskienė
- Origin: Lithuanized Polish surname
- Related names: Polish: Brzozowski, Russian:Berezovsky

Brazauskas is a Lithuanian language family name. Female forms are Brazauskienė and Brazauskaitė.

The surname may refer to:

- Algirdas Brazauskas, former President of Lithuania
- Romualdas Brazauskas, Lithuanian basketball referee
- Sandra Brazauskaitė
- Ona Brazauskaitė-Mašiotienė
