= Berezovsky =

Berezovsky or Berezowski (Polish pronunciation: [bɛrɛˈzɔfski]) is a surname of Slavic-language origin. Family nest of Berezovsky (gentry) is Bereziv village (nowadays 4 villages) in Ivano-Frankivsk region, Ukraine.

Language	Masculine	Feminine	Plural
Belarusian (Romanization)	Беразоўскі (Bierazoŭski)	Беразоўская (Bierazoŭskaja, Bierazouskaya)	
Polish	Berezowski	Berezowska	Berezowscy
Russian (Romanization)	Березовский (Berezovsky, Berezovskiy, Berezovskij)	Березовская (Berezovskaya, Berezovskaia, Berezovskaja)	Березовские
Ukrainian (Romanization)	Березовський (Berezovskyi, Berezovskyy, Berezovskyj)	Березовська (Berezovska)	

== People ==
- Antoni Berezowski (1847–1916), Polish revolutionary
- Barbara Berezowski (born 1954), Canadian ice-dancer
- Boris Berezovsky (businessman) (1946–2013), Russian businessman
- Boris Berezovsky (pianist) (born 1969), Russian pianist
- Danuta Berezowska-Prociów (born 1948), Polish track and field athlete
- David Berezovski (1896–1943), Polish-Jewish journalist and writer
- Denis Berezovsky (born 1974), Ukrainian and Crimean Navy officer
- Ekaterina Berezovskaya (born 1990), Russian journalist and TV presenter
- Igor Berezovsky (1942–2007), Russian painter, printmaker, and graphic designer
- Liliana Berezowsky (born 1944), Canadian sculptor
- Maja Berezowska (1893/8–1978), Polish painter
- Marina Berezowsky (1914–2011), Ukrainian-Australian ballet artist, choreographer, dance teacher
- Maxim Berezovsky (1745–1777), Ukrainian composer, opera singer, and violinist
- Maksymilian Berezowski (1923–2001), Polish author, journalist, and erudite scholar
- Mikhail Mikhailovich Berezovsky (1848–1912), Russian naturalist, ethnologist, and explorer
- Nicolai Berezowsky (1900–1953), American violinist and composer born in Russia
- Roman Berezovsky (born 1974), Armenian international football player
- Shaul Berezovsky (1908–1975), Polish and Israeli composer and orchestra director
- Vitali Berezovski (born 1984), Ukrainian football player
- Sholom Noach Berezovsky (1911–2000), Slonimer Rebbe
- Березовський Лесь one of the leaders of the anti-Polish uprising of 1648
- Арсенич-Березовський Микола Васильович (1910–1947), The 2nd head and the actual creator of military counter-intelligence of the OUN is the SB of the OUN, one of the nine generals of the UPA and the only general of the security of the UPA, a fighter for the independence of Ukraine in the 20th century

== See also ==
- Beryozovsky (disambiguation) (Beryozovskaya, Beryozovskoye), alternatively spelled "Berezovsky"
