= Thiuram monosulfides =

Class of chemical compounds

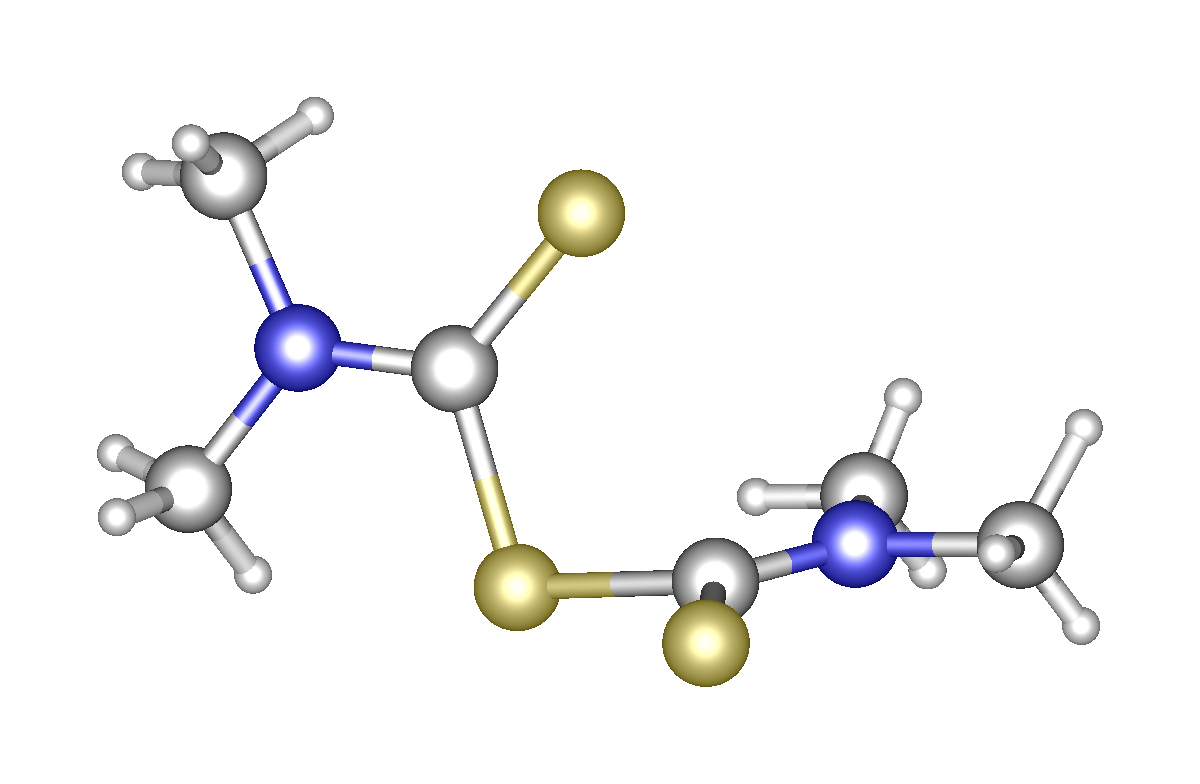
structure of tetramethylthiuram monosulfide. The C=S and C-S distances are 166, 179 picometers. Color code: yellow = S, blue = N.

Thiuram monosulfides are a class of organosulfur compounds with the formula (R_{2}NCS)_{2}S (R = organic group). Many examples are known, but popular ones include R = Me and R = Et. They are typically yellow solids that are soluble in polar organic solvents.

== Structure, synthesis ==
Thiuram monosulfides feature a pair planar thioamide subunits linked by a sulfur atom.

Thiuram monosulfides can be prepared by desulfurization of thiuram disulfides Treatment of a thiuram disulfide with triphenylphosphine, or with cyanide salts, yields the corresponding thiuram sulfide:

(R_{2}NC(S)S)_{2} + PPh_{3} → (R_{2}NCS)_{2}S + S=PPh_{3} (Ph = C_{6}H_{5})
