= Kuzovatovo =

Kuzovatovo (Russian: Кузоватово) is the name of several inhabited localities in Kuzovatovsky District of Ulyanovsk Oblast, Russia.

Urban localities

- Kuzovatovo (urban locality), a work settlement in Kuzovatovsky Settlement Okrug

Rural localities

- Kuzovatovo (rural locality), a selo in Koromyslovsky Rural Okrug
