= Dimethylthiocarbamoyl chloride =

Names
- Preferred IUPAC name Dimethylcarbamothioyl chloride

Identifiers
CAS Number	16420-13-6
3D model (JSmol)	Interactive image
ChemSpider	25932
EC Number	240-468-5
PubChem CID	27871
UNII	XDX36AS4VH
- InChI: InChI=1S/C3H6ClNS/c1-5(2)3(4)6/h1-2H3 Key: PHWISQNXPLXQRU-UHFFFAOYSA-N
- SMILES: CN(C)C(=S)Cl

Properties
Chemical formula	C_{3}H_{6}ClNS
Molar mass	123.60 g·mol^{−1}
Appearance	yellow solid
Melting point	39–43 °C (102–109 °F; 312–316 K)
Boiling point	90–95 °C (194–203 °F; 363–368 K)

Hazards
- GHS labelling
Pictograms	(GHS05: Corrosive) (GHS07: Exclamation mark)
Signal word	Warning
Hazard statements	H290, H302, H314, H317
Precautionary statements	P234, P260, P264, P264+P265, P270, P272, P280, P301+P317, P301+P330+P331, P302+P352, P302+P361+P354, P304+P340, P305+P354+P338, P316, P317, P321, P330, P333+P317, P362+P364, P363, P390, P405, P501
- Except where otherwise noted, data are given for materials in their standard state (at 25 °C [77 °F], 100 kPa). Infobox references

Dimethylthiocarbamoyl chloride is an organosulfur compound with the formula (CH_{3})_{2}NC(S)Cl. A yellow solid, it is often encountered as a yellow syrup. It is a key reagent in the synthesis of arylthiols via the Newman-Kwart rearrangement.

== Synthesis and reactions ==
Representative of other thiocarbamoyl chlorides, dimethylthiocarbamoyl chloride is electrophilic, serving as a source of R_{2}NC(S)^{+}. It is analogous to dimethylcarbamoyl chloride (R_{2}NC(O)Cl).

Dimethylthiocarbamoyl chloride is prepared by chlorination of the related tetramethylthiuram disulfide:

[Me_{2}NC(S)]_{2}S_{2} + 3 Cl_{2} → 2 Me_{2}NC(S)Cl + 2 SCl_{2}

Dimethylthiocarbamoyl chloride reacts with dithiocarbamates (R_{2}NCS^{−}_{2}) to give thiuram sulfides [R_{2}NC(S)]_{2}S. With methanethiolate, it gives methyl dimethyldithiocarbamate (Me_{2}NC(S)SMe).
