= Franciszka =

Franciszka (pronounced [fraɲˈt͡ɕiʂka]) is a Polish given name, related to English Frances. Notable people with the name include:

- Franciszka Arnsztajnowa (1865–1942), Polish poet of Jewish descent
- Franciszka Ksawera Brzozowska (1807–1872), Polish noble lady
- Franciszka Siedliska (1842–1902), founder of a Roman Catholic religious order of nuns, the Sisters of the Holy Family of Nazareth
- Franciszka Themerson (1907–1988), Polish, later British painter, illustrator, filmmaker, and stage designer
- Franciszka Urszula Radziwiłłowa (1705–1753), Polish-Lithuanian noble dramatist and writer, first Polish woman playwright
