= Newman–Kwart rearrangement =

Organic Chemical Reaction

Newman-Kwart rearrangement
Named after	Melvin Spencer Newman; Harold Kwart
Reaction type	Rearrangement reaction

Identifiers
Organic Chemistry Portal	newman-kwart-rearrangement
RSC ontology ID	RXNO:0000412

The Newman–Kwart rearrangement is a type of rearrangement reaction in which the aryl group of an O-aryl thiocarbamate, ArOC(=S)NMe_{2}, migrates from the oxygen atom to the sulfur atom, forming an S-aryl thiocarbamate, ArSC(=O)NMe_{2}. The reaction is named after its discoverers, Melvin Spencer Newman and Harold Kwart. The reaction is a manifestation of the double bond rule. The Newman–Kwart reaction represents a useful synthetic tool for the preparation of thiophenol derivatives.

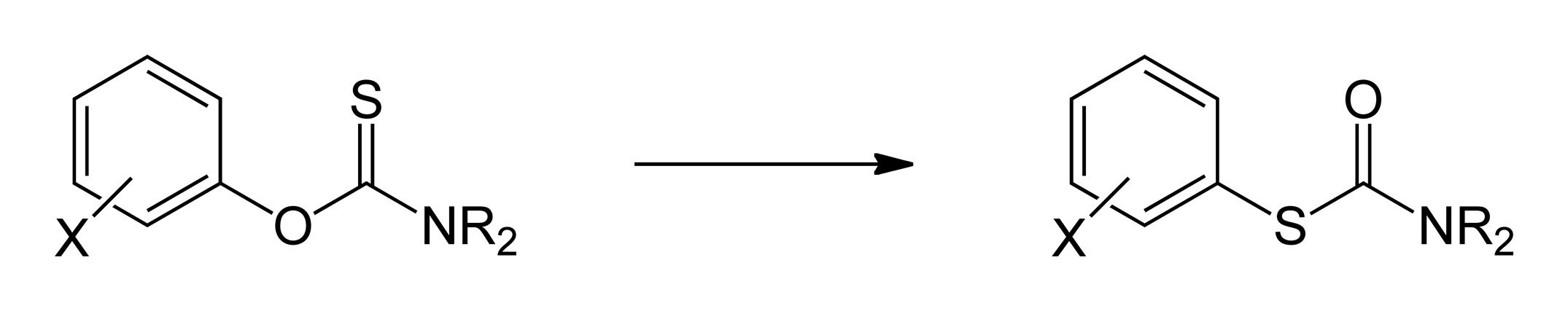

== Mechanism ==
The Newman–Kwart rearrangement is intramolecular. It is generally believed to be a concerted process, proceeding via a four-membered cyclic transition state (rather than a two-step process passing through a discrete reactive intermediate). The enthalpy of activation for this transition state is generally quite high for typical substrates (ΔH^{‡} ~ 30 to 40 kcal/mol), necessitating high reaction temperatures (200 to 300 °C, Ph_{2}O as solvent or heat).

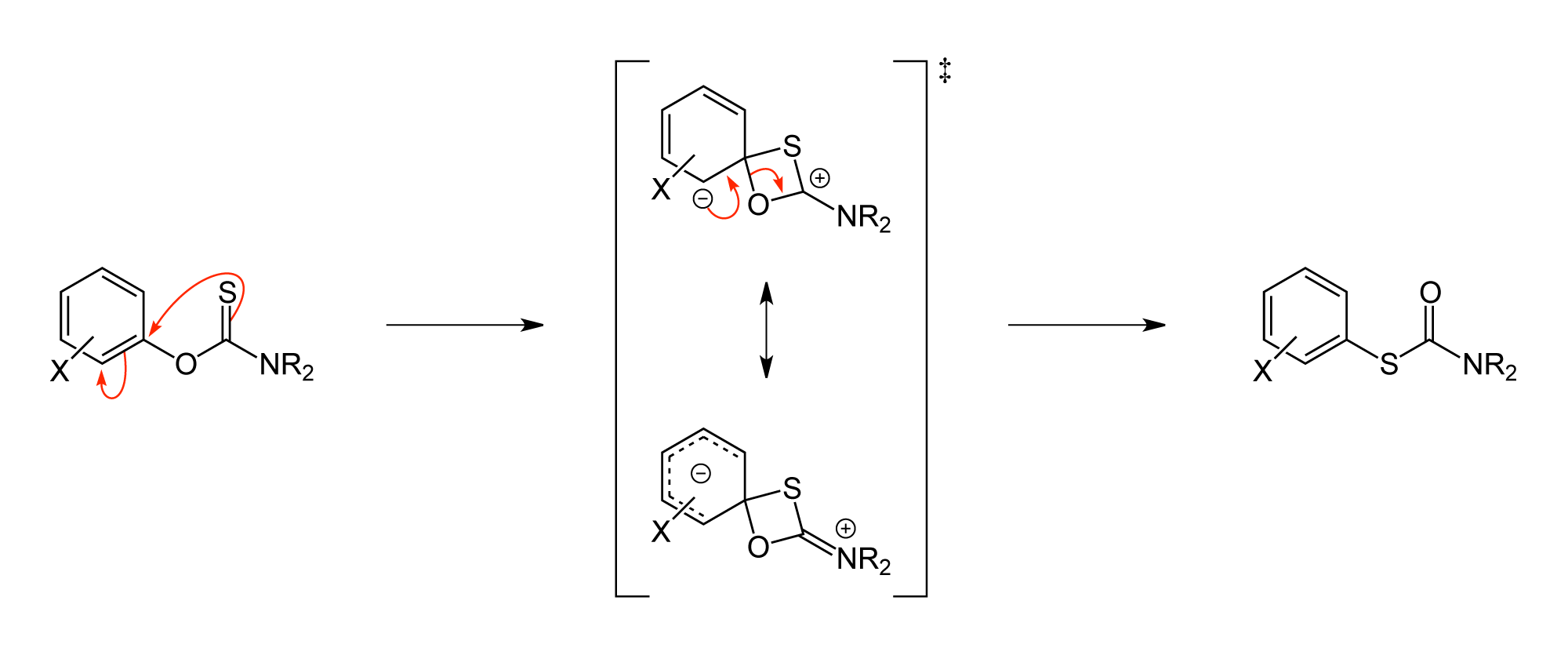

A Pd-catalyzed process and conditions under photoredox catalysis (both proceeding through complex multistep mechanisms) are known. These catalytic processes allow for much milder reaction conditions to be used (100 °C for Pd catalysis, ambient temperature for photoredox).

== Use for preparation of thiophenols ==
The Newman–Kwart rearrangement is an important prelude to the synthesis of thiophenols. A phenol (1) is deprotonated with a base followed by treatment with a thiocarbamoyl chloride (2) to form an O-aryl thiocarbamate (3). Heating 3 to around 250 °C (482 °F) causes it undergo Newman–Kwart rearrangement to an S-aryl thiocarbamate (4). Alkaline hydrolysis or similar cleavage yields a thiophenol (5).

== See also ==
- Smiles rearrangement
- Chapman rearrangement
