= C14H15NO2S =

The molecular formula C_{14}H_{15}NO_{2}S (molar mass: 261.34 g/mol, exact mass: 261.0823 u) may refer to:

- SKF-89,145
- Cyclohexylthiophthalimide (CTP)
