= Protected areas of Ulyanovsk Oblast =

The Ulyanovsk Oblast in Russia contains about 118 protected natural areas.

== National Parks ==
- Sengiley mountains

== Natural Monuments ==
- Wood Pearl
- Relic woods
- Akshuatian dendopark
- Greater springs
- The Mountain pine forest
- The Source of Sviyaga River
- The Forest belt of Genko
- Cretaceous steppes from karagana
- Upper Jurassic deposits of Gorodishchi
- Borok Island
