= Sulfur vulcanization =

Process to transform the material properties of natural rubber

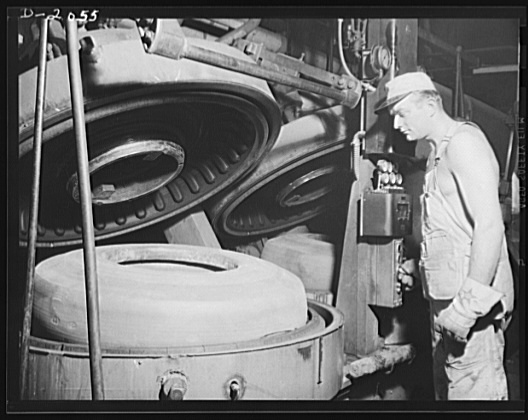
Worker placing a tire in a mold before vulcanization, 1941

Sulfur vulcanization is a chemical process for converting natural rubber or related polymers into materials of varying hardness, elasticity, and mechanical durability by heating them with sulfur or sulfur-containing compounds. Sulfur forms cross-linking bridges between sections of polymer chains which affects the mechanical properties. Many products are made with vulcanized rubber, including tires, shoe soles, hoses, and conveyor belts. The term vulcanization is derived from Vulcan, the Roman god of fire.

The main polymers subjected to sulfur vulcanization are polyisoprene (natural rubber, NR), polybutadiene rubber (BR) and styrene-butadiene rubber (SBR), and ethylene propylene diene monomer rubber (EPDM rubber). All of these materials contain alkene groups adjacent to methylene groups. Other specialty rubbers may also be vulcanized, such as nitrile rubber (NBR) and butyl rubber (IIR). Vulcanization, in common with the curing of other thermosetting polymers, is generally irreversible. Efforts have focused on developing de-vulcanization (see tire recycling) processes for recycling of rubber waste but with little success.

== Structural and mechanistic details ==
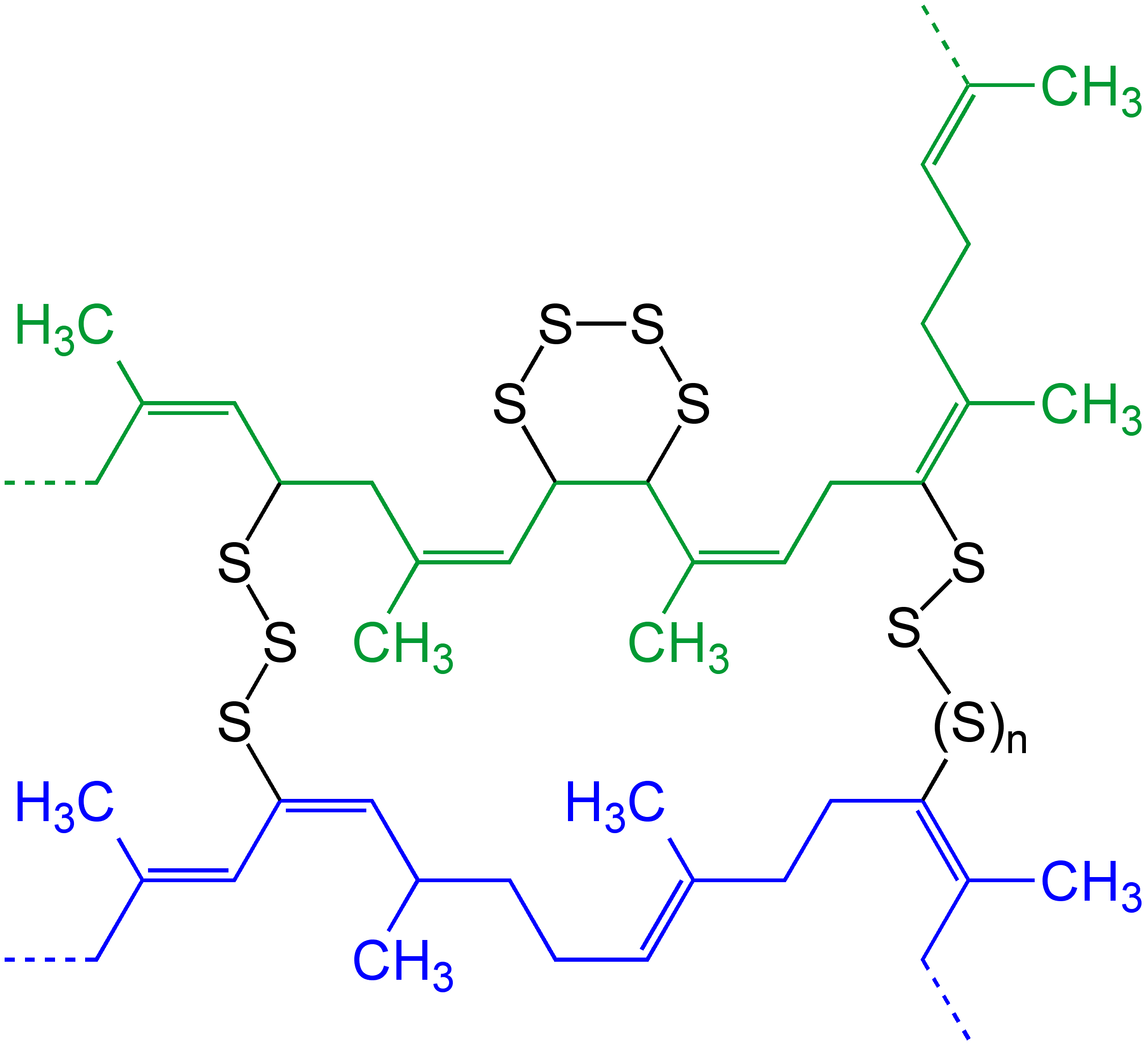
General representation of the chemical structure of vulcanized natural rubber showing the crosslinking of two polymer chains (blue and green) with sulfur (n = 0, 1, 2, 3 ...) N.B. In this image, the degree of crosslinking is exaggerated for illustrative purposes.

The details of vulcanization remain murky because the process converts mixtures of polymers to mixtures of insoluble derivatives. By design the reaction does not proceed to completion because a fully crosslinked polymer would be too rigid for applications. There has long been uncertainty as to whether vulcanization proceeds in a radical or ionic manner.

It is agreed that the reactive sites, often referred to as 'cure sites', are the allyl groups (-CH=CH-CH_{2}-). Sulfur forms bridge between these sites, crosslinking the polymer chains. These bridges may consist of one or several sulfur atoms and are separated by hundreds or thousands of carbons in the polymer chain. Both the extent of crosslinking and the number of sulfur atoms in the crosslinks strongly influences the physical properties of the rubber produced:

- Excessive crosslinking can convert the rubber into a hard and brittle substance (i.e. ebonite).
- Short crosslinks, possessing lower numbers of sulfur atoms, give the rubber better resistance to heat and weathering.
- Longer crosslinks, with higher numbers of sulfur atoms, give the rubber improved physical durability and tensile strength.

Sulfur, by itself, is a slow vulcanizing agent and does not vulcanize synthetic polyolefins. Even with natural rubber, large amounts of sulfur as well as high temperatures and prolonged heating periods are necessary, with the end products often being of an unsatisfactory quality.

Since the early 1900s, various chemical additives have been developed to improve the speed and efficiency of vulcanization, as well as to control the nature of the cross-linking. When used together, this collection – the "cure package" – gives a rubber with particular properties.

The extent to which vulcanization is allowed to proceed determines the physical properties of the resulting rubber—namely, a greater degree of crosslinking corresponds to a more rigid material. Conventional methods of rubber manufacturing are typically irreversible; as such, rubber is considered to be a thermoset material.

== Cure package ==
The cure package consists of various reagents that modify the kinetics and chemistry of crosslinking. These include accelerants, activators, retarders and inhibitors. Note that these are merely the additives used for vulcanization and that other compounds may also be added to the rubber, such as fillers, tackifiers, polymer stabilizers and antiozonants.

=== Sulfur source ===
Ordinary sulfur (octasulfur, or S_{8}) is rarely used, despite its low cost, because it is soluble in the polymer. High-temperature vulcanisation with ordinary sulfur leads to rubber supersaturated with S_{8}, upon cooling this migrates to the surface and crystallises as sulfur bloom. This can cause problems if multiple layers of rubber are being added to form a composite item, such as a tire. Instead, various forms of polymeric sulfur are used, which are insoluble in the uncured rubber. It is also possible to replace sulfur with other sulfur-donating compounds, for example accelerants bearing disulfide groups, in what is often termed "efficient vulcanization" (EV). Disulfur dichloride may also be used for "cold vulcanization".

=== Accelerants ===
Accelerants (accelerators) act much like catalysts allowing vulcanization to be performed cooler yet faster and with a more efficient use of sulfur. They achieve this by reacting with the sulfur to form a reactive intermediate, referred to as a sulfurating agent. This, in turn, reacts with cure sites in the rubber to bring about vulcanization.

There are two major classes of vulcanization accelerants: primary accelerants and secondary accelerants (also known as ultra accelerants). Primary activators date from the use of ammonia in 1881, while secondary accelerants have been developed since around 1920.

Primary (fast-accelerants)

Primary accelerants perform the bulk of the accelerating and mostly consist of thiazoles, often derivatised with sulfenamide groups. The principal compound is 2-mercaptobenzothiazole (MBT), which has been in use since the 1920s. It remains a moderately fast curing agent giving sulfur chains of a medium length, but its relatively short induction period can be a disadvantage. Other primary accelerants are essentially "masked" forms of MBT, which take time to decompose into MBT during vulcanization and thus have longer inductions periods.

Mercaptobenzothiazole (MBT)

Mercaptobenzothiazole disulfide (MBTS)

N-Cyclohexylbenzothiazol-2-sulfenamide (CBS)

Dicyclohexyl-2-benzothiazolesulfenamide (DCBS)

Oxidative dimerization of MBT gives mercaptobenzothiazole disulfide (MBTS), and sulfenamide derivatives are produced by reacting this with primary amines like cyclohexylamine or tert-butylamine. Secondary amines like dicyclohexylamine can be used and result in even slower accelerants. Such a slow accelerant is required in applications in which the rubber is being cured onto a metal component to which it is required to adhere, such as the steel cords in vehicle tires.

Secondary (ultra-accelerants)

Secondary or ultra-accelerants are used in small amounts to augment the behaviour of primary accelerants. They act to boost the cure speed and increase cross-link density, but also shorten the induction time, which can lead to premature vulcanization. Chemically, they consist mainly of thio-carbonyl species such as thiurams, dithiocarbamates, xanthates and organic thioureas; aromatic guanidines are also used. These compounds need to be combined with activators, typically zinc ions, in order to be fully active.

Thiuram

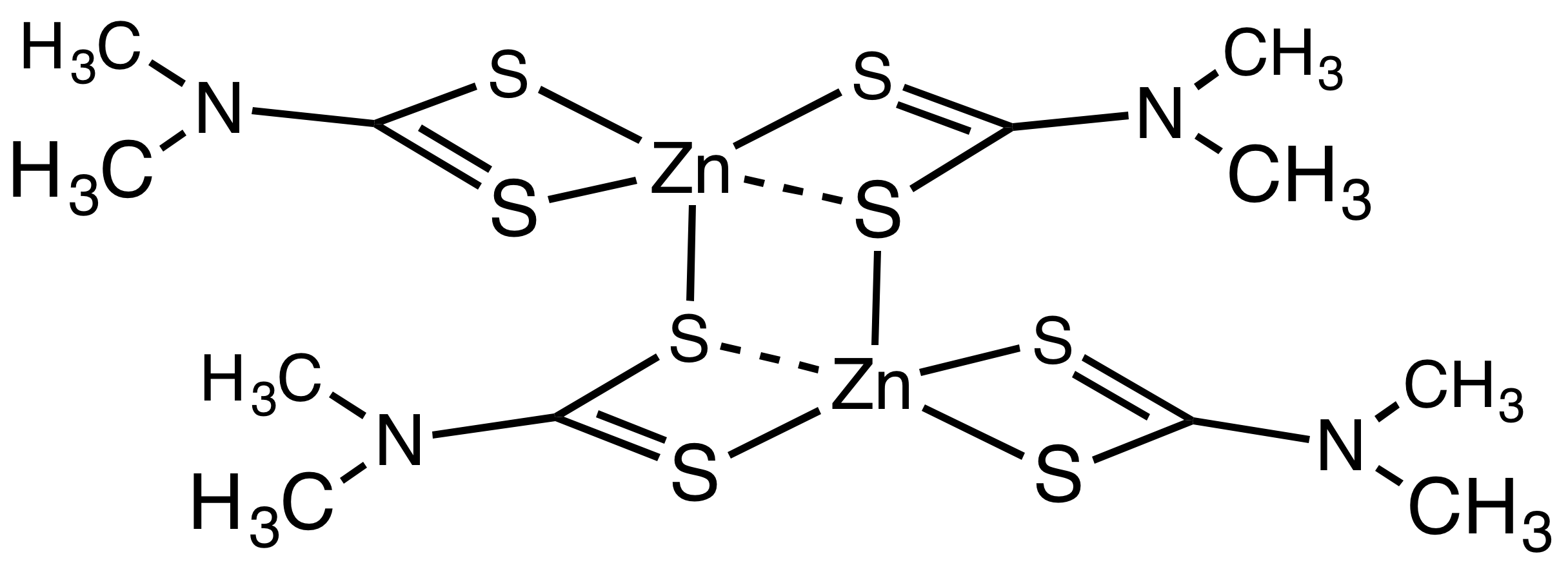
Zinc bis(dimethyldithiocarbamate) (Ziram)

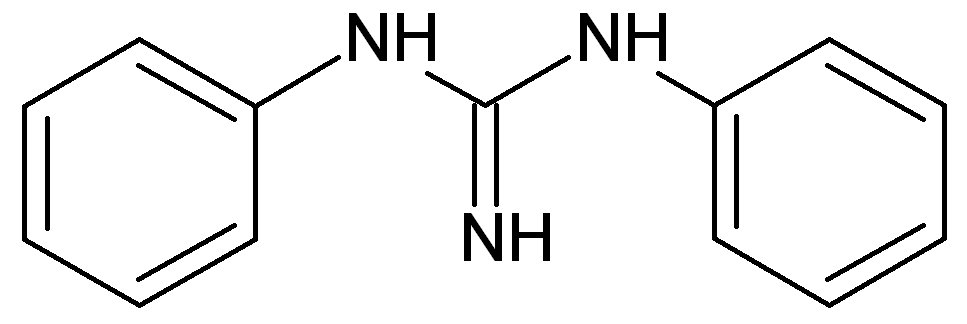
diphenylguanidine (DPG)

Secondary accelerants have very fast vulcanization speeds with minimal induction time, making them unsuitable as primary accelerants in highly unsaturated rubbers such as NR or SBR. However, they can be used as primary accelerants in compounds with fewer curing site such as EPDM. Xanthates (principally, zinc isopropyl xanthate) are important in the vulcanization of latex, which is cured at relatively low temperatures (100-120 °C), and therefore needs an inherently rapid accelerant. The major thiurams used are TMTD (tetramethylthiuram disulfide) and TETD (tetraethylthiuram disulfide). The major dithiocarbamates are the zinc salts ZDMC (zinc dimethyldithiocarbamate), ZDEC (zinc diethyldithiocarbamate) and ZDBC (zinc dibutyldithiocarbamate).

=== Activators ===
Activators consist of various metal salts, fatty acids, as well as nitrogen-containing bases, the most important these being zinc oxide. Zinc activates many accelerants by coordination, for example causing thiuram to convert into ziram. Zinc also coordinates to the sulfur-chains of sulfurating agents, changing the most likely bond to break during cross-link formation. Ultimately, activators promote the efficient use of sulfur to give a high density of cross-links. Due to the low solubility of ZnO it is often combined with fatty acids such as stearic acid to form more soluble metallic soap, i.e., zinc stearate.

=== Retarders and inhibitors ===
Cyclohexylthiophthalimide is used to impede the onset of vulcanization.

To ensure high-quality vulcanization, the rubber, sulfur, accelerants, activators and other compounds are blended to give a homogeneous mixture. In practice, mixing can result in melting the sulfur (melting point 115 °C for S_{8}). At these temperatures vulcanization can begin prematurely, which is often undesirable, as the mixture may still need to be pumped and moulded into its final form before it sets solid. Premature vulcanization is often called "scorch". Scorch can be prevented by the use of retarders or inhibitors, which increase the induction period before vulcanization commences and thus provide scorch resistance. A retarder slows both the onset and rate of vulcanization, whereas inhibitors only delay the start of vulcanization and do not affect the rate to any great extent. In general inhibitors are preferred, with cyclohexylthiophthalimide (often termed PVI — pre-vulcanization inhibitor) being the most common example.

== Devulcanization ==
The market for new raw rubber or equivalent is large. The auto industry consumes a substantial fraction of natural and synthetic rubber. Reclaimed rubber has altered properties and is unsuitable for use in many products, including tires. Tires and other vulcanized products are potentially amenable to devulcanization, but this technology has not produced material that can supplant unvulcanized materials. The main problem is that the carbon-sulfur linkages are not readily broken, without the input of costly reagents and heat. Thus, more than half of scrap rubber is simply burned for fuel.

== Inverse vulcanization ==
Although polymeric sulfur reverts to its monomer at room temperature, polymers consisting mostly of sulfur can be stabilized with organic linkers such as 1,3‐diisopropenylbenzene. This process is called inverse vulcanization and produces polymers where sulfur is the main component.

== History ==
The curing of rubber has been carried out since prehistoric times. The name of the first major civilization in Guatemala and Mexico, the Olmec, means 'rubber people' in the Aztec language. Ancient Mesoamericans, spanning from ancient Olmecs to Aztecs, extracted latex from Castilla elastica, a type of rubber tree in the area. The juice of a local vine, Ipomoea alba, was then mixed with this latex to create processed rubber as early as 1600 BCE. In the Western world, rubber remained a curiosity, although it was eventually used to produce waterproofed products, such as Mackintosh rainwear, beginning in the early 1800s.

=== Modern developments ===
In 1832–1834 Nathaniel Hayward and Friedrich Ludersdorf discovered that rubber treated with sulfur lost its stickiness. It is likely Hayward shared his discovery with Charles Goodyear, possibly inspiring him to make the discovery of vulcanization.

Charles Goodyear (1800–1860), a scientist and engineer, was the first to patent vulcanization of rubber, through "combining of sulphur and white lead with the indie-rubber, and in the submitting of the compound thus formed to the action of heat at a regulated temperature". He was awarded a patent on June 15, 1844. William Brockedon coined term 'vulcanization', in 1845, and first appeared in the 1847 patent of John Tyrell. In 1847, Thomas Hancock was awarded a British Patent for a process to vulcanize rubber; this was court granted after he asserted his formula for vulcanizing rubber was developed independently.

Goodyear claimed that he had discovered vulcanization earlier, in 1839. He wrote the story of the discovery in 1853 in his autobiographical book Gum-Elastica. Here is Goodyear's account of the invention, taken from Gum-Elastica. Although the book is an autobiography, Goodyear chose to write it in the third person so that the inventor and he referred to in the text are the author. He describes the scene in a rubber factory where his brother worked:

The inventor made experiments to ascertain the effect of heat on the same compound that had decomposed in the mail-bags and other articles. He was surprised to find that the specimen, being carelessly brought into contact with a hot stove, charred like leather.

Goodyear goes on to describe how his discovery was not readily accepted.

He directly inferred that if the process of charring could be stopped at the right point, it might divest the gum of its native adhesiveness throughout, which would make it better than the native gum. Upon further trial with heat, he was further convinced of the correctness of this inference, by finding that the India rubber could not be melted in boiling sulfur at any heat, but always charred. He made another trial of heating a similar fabric before an open fire. The same effect, that of charring the gum, followed. There were further indications of success in producing the desired result, as upon the edge of the charred portion appeared a line or border, that was not charred, but perfectly cured.

Goodyear then goes on to describe how he moved to Woburn, Massachusetts and carried out a series of systematic experiments to optimize the curing of rubber, collaborating with Nathaniel Hayward.

On ascertaining to a certainty that he had found the object of his search and much more, and that the new substance was proof against cold and the solvent of the native gum, he felt himself amply repaid for the past, and quite indifferent to the trials of the future.

=== Later developments ===
The discovery of the rubber-sulfur reaction revolutionized the use and applications of rubber, changing the face of the industrial world. Formerly, the only way to seal a small gap between moving machine parts was to use leather soaked in oil. This practice was acceptable only at moderate pressures, but above a certain point, machine designers were forced to compromise between the extra friction generated by tighter packing and greater leakage of steam. Vulcanized rubber solved this problem. It could be formed to precise shapes and dimensions, it accepted moderate to large deformations under load and recovered quickly to its original dimensions once the load is removed. These exceptional qualities, combined with good durability and lack of stickiness, were critical for an effective sealing material. Further experiments in the processing and compounding of rubber by Hancock and his colleagues led to a more reliable process.

Around 1900, disulfiram was introduced as a vulcanizing agent, and became widely used.

In 1905 George Oenslager discovered that a derivative of aniline called thiocarbanilide accelerated the reaction of sulfur with rubber, leading to shorter cure times and reducing energy consumption. This breakthrough was almost as fundamental to the rubber industry as Goodyear's sulfur cure. Accelerators made the cure process faster, improved the reliability of the process and enabled vulcanization to be applied to synthetic polymers. One year after his discovery, Oenslager had found hundreds of applications for his additive. Thus, the science of accelerators and retarders was born. An accelerator speeds up the cure reaction, while a retarder delays it. A typical retarder is cyclohexylthiophthalimide. In the subsequent century chemists developed other accelerators and ultra-accelerators, which are used in the manufacture of most modern rubber goods.

== See also ==
- Sulfur concrete
- Bis(triethoxysilylpropyl)tetrasulfide
