= Socialist realism in film =

Painting by Igor B. Berezovsky (1957), translated to "We will fulfill the party's commission!"

Socialist Realism was the official doctrine of art produced in the Soviet Union, through which the emerging medium of film took prominence. The doctrine mandated an idealized depiction of society under socialism, with Soviet film of the era conforming to standards approved by the First Congress of Soviet Writers. Lenin would pose cinema as the most important medium of art for the time. Following World War II, communist countries such as China would apply the socialist realist doctrine to their films in order to portray an idealized picture of the country. A major concern of Socialist Realist film was to depict an optimistic view of socialist and classless society. While this style was meant to induce reality, films were often designed to promote a message or paradigm adhering to the socialist vision.

== History ==
=== Development ===
The original goal of state-mandated film in the Soviet Union was to develop a means of propaganda purposed to usurp other forms of entertainment. 1920s cinema was designed to make a financial and ideological impact, and by the mid-1930s, foreign films were no longer imported into Russia from outside countries. By the 1940s, the number of films released per year had fallen significantly, and Soviet leaders accepted that ideological success was best found in a handful of select, vetted works.

Following World War II in the mid-1940s, Soviet film in Russia and Ukraine began major reconstruction. Technological requirements were often met with shortages, often so great that film workers were forced to borrow and barter for equipment from acquaintances. The negative consequences of wartime conditions led to a period of decentralization, but the formation of the Artistic Council of the Committee for Cinema Affairs was the first major step towards re-centralizing cinema, as they were mandated in reviewing films prior to release and ensuring socialist realist ideals.

=== Characteristics ===
During the 1930s, Soviet film began assembling their film around unstructured plotting. This marked a shift away from the Soviet montage cinema of the 1920s, and signaled the advent of mandated socialist realism in 1934. The goal of this design was to ensure a focus on digestible theme in contrast to heavily structured plot. Socialist realist utopian ideals were to be the main focus of Soviet film during the time, which led to a shift away from traditional plotting. Abstract concepts of socialist realism were required to be made accessible and realistic for a general populous, which often led to the devolution of traditional narrative. The utopian "theme" often became the driving force in a film, and the actual events depicted onscreen were connected conceptually rather than linearly.

== Musical comedy ==
=== Development ===
During the 1930s, there was doubt in Russia about whether the rapidly advancing country could support film due to the medium's lack of audience support. Throughout the 1920s, foreign films would receive more box-office success in Russia than their domestic counterparts. Advances in sound technology of the time led most positive reception toward the musical, which allowed evolution in the sphere of acting. This shifted the emphasis of film away from montage and towards actors, following the ideological shift towards the individual as a part of collective Russia.

Soviet cinema mirrored guidelines set by the First Congress of Soviet Writers during the 1930s, meant to portray a positive view of revolutionary reality. In particular, films of the time were designed to both to be understood by and appeal to a general audience. The musical comedy was discovered as an optimal means to depict the socialist utopia. Its main goal was to translate the optimistic possibility of the world on screen to the lives of the audience. In doing so, it would present films that a Russian audience was interested in supporting, rather than being coerced to watch.

The height of the musical comedy in the Soviet Union took place from the mid-1930s to the early 1940s. Its success was closely tied with the advent of Socialist Realist policies in Russia. The genre was most suited to connect an ideal future with present development in the country, while still maintaining the importance of a collective and centralized government. While foreign critiques at this time would dismiss Soviet musical comedies as unrealistic and romanticized, others found that they were able to accurately translate Stalin's ideas for the depiction of Russia in art. Both the rising fame of individual actors and the use of music were closely tied towards the genre's growth during this period.

The late 1940s led to a decrease in the popularity of the musical comedy. This is due to a shifting focus in Soviet film towards the war, after which Khrushchev's "thaw" period in the mid-1950s would loosen restrictions in the Socialist Realist guidelines and allow for a more diverse range of released films. Khrushchev would criticize Soviet film of the time for a false depiction of Soviet prosperity and an overstated emphasis on Stalin. This would signal a shift in the doctrine of Socialist Realism and the utilization of the musical comedy, which eventually led to the genre's decline.

=== Characteristics ===
The musical comedy's popularity was due to several factors. Its capacity to both mirror and divert reality was appealing to Russian citizens, serving both as a form of entertainment and the possibility of a utopian future. The combination of a long-seeded interest in song and a new intrigue in film allowed for a wide nostalgic appeal, especially through the use of traditional Russian folk music. These factors led to a genre that was less equipped to deliver a blunt reality, yet still capable of touching on many key facets of both Russia's history and the values of socialist ideals.

One of the main facets of the socialist realist comedy was to bring the reality depicted on screen into the lives of the audience. This was employed through many techniques, such as through "fairy-tale" narratives, the use of relatable and traditional music, and setting these films in well-known geographical locations. Oftentimes, musicals would involve two male suitors combatting for the affection of a woman. One is found worthy due to his productivity as a worker, while the other is dismissed. These films often possess a critical moment in which the depicted socialist realist reality is invited into the lives of the audience. After an initial love interest is revealed, storylines would shift focus to the creation of a socialist utopia. Upon successful completion, the couple is united under these shared ideals. These two successes are seen to be correlated, and the woman's decision to pursue collectivism works as her reward.

== Countries outside of Russia ==
=== Poland ===
Socialist realism was officially mandated in Poland in January 1949, and was integrated into Polish film during the Congress of polish filmmakers in November of that year. These decisions resulted in increased censorship and shared socialist realist goals applied to the Polish film industry.

==== Animated film ====
Polish animated cinema was expected to meet three criteria: a realistic construction, a basis in propaganda, and original artistic depiction. These goals were often paradoxical. The realist requirements contrasted the fantastical nature of the animated genre, and the need for an original artistic vision often worked against a practical depiction of contemporary Poland. Because of this, the demands for an accurate reflection of socialist reality were challenging for Polish animators to meet. Filmmakers in the Soviet Union also struggled to accurately depict a revolutionary reality, and Polish animators were forced to create their own artistic model. Often Polish filmmakers were forced to forego accuracy, and turned to genres such as allegory to educate children.

The Polish film industry dedicated animated film to the exclusive purpose of educating children. The goal of animated films were often to convince children of the new socialist system in Poland and instill ideology. Oftentimes, filmmakers were not socially aware, and many films were censored due to ideological errors. This threat of censorship forced filmmakers to adjust their scripts, which many believed caused a loss of effectiveness to the overall project. Polish animators also struggled with significant time restraints and a lack of state investment, which hampered the quality of their work and led to scathing critiques. While many would find the socialist realist restraints to be detrimental to the animation industry, it would also provide the groundwork for major advances in the genre during the "thaw" period following Stalin's death.

=== China ===
Beginning the 1950s, the CCP began to incorporate socialist realist ideals into their films, an artistic medium which they understood to be of great importance. While the ideology depicted onscreen was often known by Chinese audiences, the CCP utilized film showings more as socialist achievements in themselves. Film showings were designed to highlight the Chinese people as a collective, a gesture of the individual reborn into a collective identity. In contrast to other art forms, films were designed to create the "real experience" of socialist concepts, as they were direct depictions unconstrained by the audience's literacy and availability (which were requirements for understanding literature and theatre).
