= Melvin Spencer Newman =

American chemist and professor

Melvin Spencer Newman (March 10, 1908 – May 30, 1993) was an American chemist, Ohio State University professor, best known for inventing the Newman projection.

Newman was born in New York City in a Jewish family, the youngest of Mae (née Polack) and Jacob K. Newman's four children. His paternal grandfather was the New Orleans German-born investment banker and philanthropist Isidore Newman.

Shortly after his birth, his family moved to New Orleans, Louisiana. When he was 14, they moved back to New York, where he attended Riverdale County School. From 1925 to 1932, he attended Yale University, where he obtained his B.A. magna cum laude in 1929 and his PhD in 1932, under the direction of Professor Rudolph J. Anderson. He was a member of Zeta Beta Tau.

After postdoctoral stays at Yale, Columbia University and Harvard University, he began his independent career as an instructor at Ohio State University, where he remained for the rest of his life. He was promoted to assistant professor in 1940 and to full professor in 1944.

He was a member of Sigma Xi, Phi Lambda Upsilon, Alpha Epsilon Delta, American Chemical Society and the American Association for the Advancement of Science. He was elected a member of the National Academy of Sciences in 1956.

Newman received numerous awards, including the American Chemical Society (ACS) Award for Creative Work in Synthetic Organic Chemistry in 1961, the Morley Medal given by the Cleveland, Ohio section of the ACS in 1969, the Wilbur Lucius Cross Medal by Yale in 1975, an honorary doctorate by the University of New Orleans in 1975, the Columbus section of the ACS award in 1976, and the Joseph Sullivant Medal by Ohio State University in 1976. In addition, the Newman projection - which allows organic chemists to represent different conformations of molecules in space - was introduced by the chemist.

Newman was an avid golfer.

Newman married Beatrice Crystal in 1933. They had two daughters and two sons: Kiefer, Susan, Beth and Robert.

His sister Alice Louis was Nicolai Berezowsky's first wife.

== See also ==
- the Newman-Kwart rearrangement, a reaction named after Newman and Harold Kwart
