= Borok Island =

Island in Ulyanovsk Oblast, Russia

Island «Borok»
- IUCN category III (natural monument or feature)
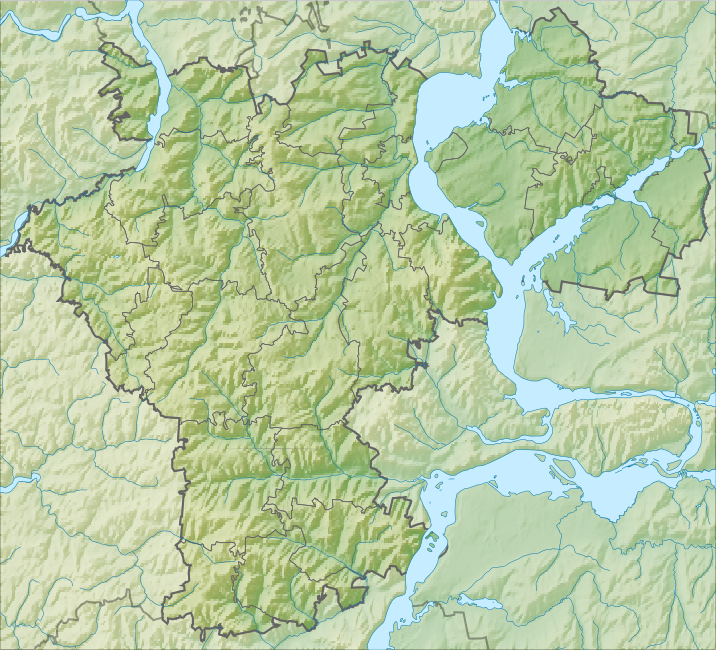
- Location within Ulyanovsk Oblast
- Location: Nikolskoe on Cheremshan, Ulyanovsk, Russia
- Coordinates: 54°00′16″N 49°11′16″E
- Area: 0.0019 km^{2} (0.00073 sq mi)
- Established: 1989

Ostrov Borok (Russian: остров Борок) is a natural monument listed among the protected areas of Ulyanovsk Oblast in Russia.

The territory is heavily forested, and its trees are home to a large colony of grey herons, with approximately 403 breeding pairs. The nitrogen-rich soil allows nettles and celandine in to grow large quantities. Birds are common here, including black hawk, cheglok, sea-eagle, vyakhir, coast swallow, the eastern Zavirushka bluebird, finches, seagulls, and krachki. The area is also the habitat of the quick lizard and raccoon dogs.

Felling trees is forbidden in this territory and human visits are limited to fishermen, hunters, and scientists observing the biocenosis.
