= Beryozovsky Urban Okrug =

Location of Kemerovo Oblast in Russia

Location of Sverdlovsk Oblast in Russia

Beryozovsky Urban Okrug is the name of several municipal formations in Russia. The following administrative divisions are incorporated as such:

- Town of Oblast Significance of Beryozovsky, Kemerovo Oblast
- Town of Beryozovsky, Sverdlovsk Oblast

== See also ==
- Beryozovsky (disambiguation)
