= Akshuat dendropark =

Akshuatian dendropark
- IUCN category III (natural monument or feature)
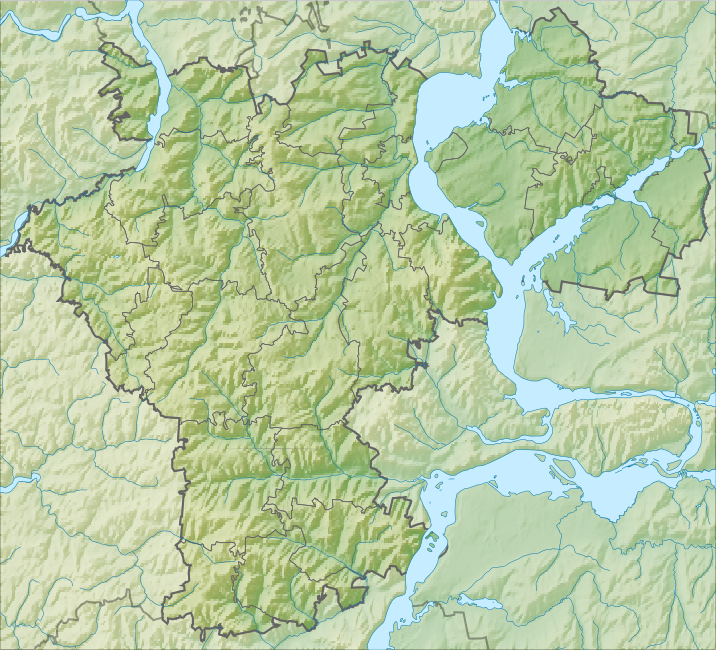
- Location within Ulyanovsk Oblast
- Location: Akshuat, Barysh region, Ulyanovsk, Russia
- Coordinates: 53°40′07″N 47°26′13″E
- Area: 0.0063 km^{2} (0.0024 sq mi)
- Established: 1848-1912

Akshuat dendropark (Russian: Акшуатский дендропарк) is a natural monument (Protected areas of Ulyanovsk Oblast)

== Basic special features ==
There are a lot of exotic rocks of trees in this Protected Area (above 70 nowadays). All trees are fertile. Examples of the species-exotics: the larch of Sukachev, the pine tree of Veymutov, fir tree is Siberian, juniper, maggoniya. Not the sanitary felling of forest is forbidden in the territory. Researching and scientific work presented. There are places of the rest and a sport camp.

== The basis for creation of the protected area and its importance ==
Unique assembly of trees and bushes from the different countries of the world (it is more than 150 kinds), landed in the middle of 19th century in V.N.Polivanova's manor. It was created as nursery of coniferous breeds for protection of farmland against sandy drifts.
