= The Mountain pine forest =

- IUCN category III (natural monument or feature)
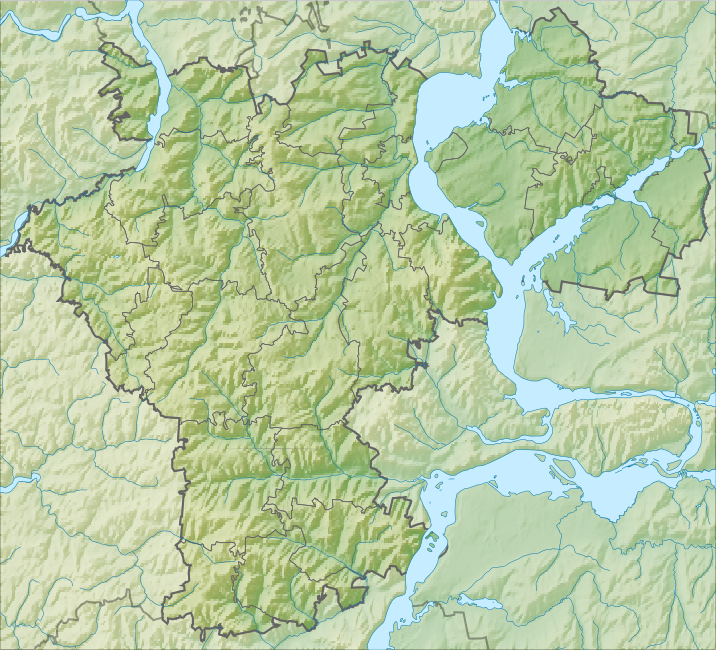
- Location within Ulyanovsk Oblast
- Location: Sengileevsky area, Ulyanovsk, Russia
- Coordinates: 54°00′14″N 48°39′46″E
- Area: 0.0012 km^{2} (0.00046 sq mi)
- Established: 1988

The Mountain pine forest (Russian: Горный сосняк на отложениях палеогена) - is a natural monument of Russia (Protected areas of Ulyanovsk Oblast).

== Basic features of nature ==
25 metres high vegetation of pine, linden and birch trees. Bushy flora: cherries, spindle tree, broom, kizilnik, lazurnik. Grassy tier: veynik, lily of the valley, orlyak, pyrethrum. All forms of fellings, girder and pasturing of cattle are forbidden. Because of lack of financing researching and scientific work is not conducive.

== Bases for creation ==
Age of 130 years of a natural origin. Nature protection value preservation of ancient pine forests on stony adjournment and rare kinds of a bush.
