= Beryozovsky (inhabited locality) =

Beryozovsky (Russian: Берёзовский; masculine), Beryozovskaya (Берёзовская; feminine), or Beryozovskoye (Берёзовское; neuter) is the name of several inhabited localities in Russia.

== Republic of Kalmykia ==
As of 2010, one rural locality in the Republic of Kalmykia bears this name:

- Beryozovskoye (rural locality), a selo in Yashaltinsky District

== Kemerovo Oblast ==
As of 2010, two inhabited localities in Kemerovo Oblast bear this name:

- Beryozovsky, Kemerovo Oblast, a town of oblast significance
- Beryozovsky (rural locality), Kemerovo Oblast, a rural locality (a settlement) under the jurisdiction of the urban-type settlement of Zelenogorsky

== Sverdlovsk Oblast ==
As of 2010, two inhabited localities in Sverdlovsk Oblast bear this name:

- Beryozovsky, Sverdlovsk Oblast, a town of oblast significance
- Beryozovsky (rural locality), Sverdlovsk Oblast, a rural locality (a settlement) in Beryozovsky Selsoviet of Alapayevsky District

== Volgograd Oblast ==
As of 2010, one rural locality in Volgograd Oblast bears this name:

- Beryozovskaya (rural locality), a stanitsa in Beryozovsky Selsoviet of Danilovsky District

== Other ==
- Beryozovsky, several rural localities in other federal subjects
