= Dicyclohexylamine =

- Structural Formula dicyclohexylamine

Names
- Preferred IUPAC name N-Cyclohexylcyclohexanamine

Identifiers
CAS Number	101-83-7
3D model (JSmol)	Interactive image
ChemSpider	7301
ECHA InfoCard	100.002.710
EC Number	202-980-7
PubChem CID	7582
UNII	1A93RJW924
CompTox Dashboard (EPA)	DTXSID6025018
- InChI: InChI=1S/C12H23N/c1-3-7-11(8-4-1)13-12-9-5-2-6-10-12/h11-13H,1-10H2 Key: XBPCUCUWBYBCDP-UHFFFAOYSA-N
- SMILES: C1CCC(CC1)NC2CCCCC2

Properties
Chemical formula	C_{12}H_{23}N
Molar mass	181.323 g·mol^{−1}
Appearance	Pale yellow liquid
Density	0.912 g/cm^{3}
Melting point	−0.1 °C (31.8 °F; 273.0 K)
Boiling point	255.8 °C (492.4 °F; 529.0 K)
Solubility in water	0.8 g/L

Hazards
- Lethal dose or concentration (LD, LC)
LD_{50} (median dose)	373 mg/kg (oral)
- Except where otherwise noted, data are given for materials in their standard state (at 25 °C [77 °F], 100 kPa). Infobox references

Dicyclohexylamine is a secondary amine with the chemical formula HN(C_{6}H_{11})_{2}. It is a colorless liquid, although commercial samples can appear yellow. It has a fishy odor, typical for amines. It is sparingly soluble in water. As an amine, it is an organic base and useful precursor to other chemicals.

== Synthesis ==
Dicyclohexylamine, as a mixture with cyclohexylamine, is prepared by the catalytic hydrogenation of aniline (phenylamine), with a catalyst of ruthenium and/or palladium. This method produces mainly cyclohexylamine with little dicyclohexylamine. Better results have been reported when the catalyst is applied to a support of niobic acid and/or tantalic acid. It is also obtained by reductive amination of cyclohexanone with ammonia or cyclohexylamine.

Dicyclohexylamine may also be prepared by pressure hydrogenation of diphenylamine using a ruthenium catalyst, or by the reaction of cyclohexanone with cyclohexylamine in the presence of a palladium/carbon catalyst under a hydrogen pressure of about 4 mm Hg.

== Applications ==
Dicyclohexylamine has applications that are similar to those of cyclohexylamine, namely the production of:

- antioxidants in rubber and plastics
- vulcanization accelerators for rubber
- corrosion inhibitors in steam pipes and boilers
- agrochemicals
- textile chemicals
- catalysts for flexible polyurethane foams
