= Relic woods =

Natural monument in Ulyanovsk Oblast, Russia

- IUCN category III (natural monument or feature)
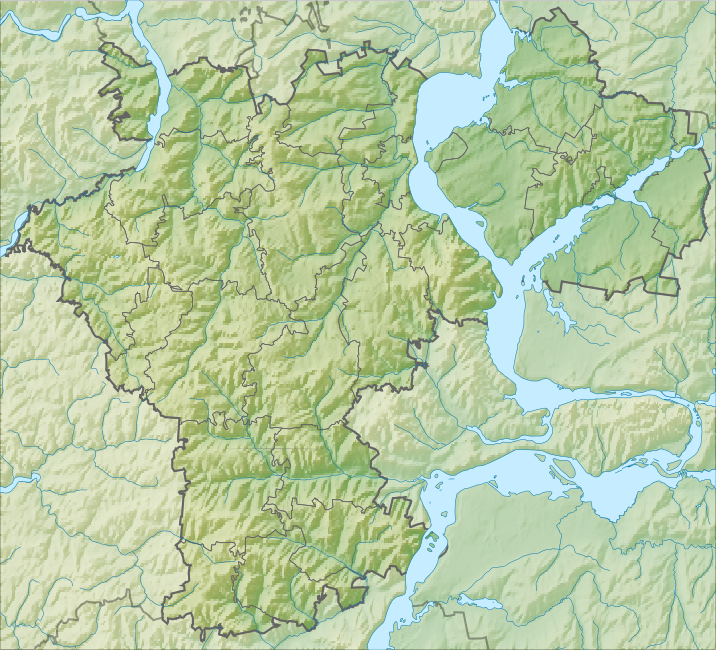
- Location within Ulyanovsk Oblast
- Location: Mullovka, Melekess region, Ulyanovsk, Russia
- Coordinates: 54°14′55″N 49°12′55″E
- Area: 0.0063 km^{2} (0.0024 sq mi)
- Established: 1976

Relic woods (Russian: Рели́ктовые леса́) is a natural monument (Protected areas of Ulyanovsk Oblast).

== Basic features of nature ==
Contains two areas: 1.22 metres high vegetation, consists of linden (near 90%) and birch (near 10%) trees. The store of woodpulp are 310 cube metres at 1 hectare. Square: 48,8 hectares. 2.23 metres high vegetation, consists of linden (near 90%) and birch (near 10%) trees. The store of woodpulp are 380 cube metres at 1 hectare. Square: 11,3 hectares. Another rocks: maple, filbert. All manage works are prohibited with the aim to save value vegetation. Researching and scientific work is not conducing.
