= Smiles rearrangement =

Organic reaction

In organic chemistry, the Smiles rearrangement is an organic reaction and a rearrangement reaction named after British chemist Samuel Smiles. It is an intramolecular, nucleophilic aromatic substitution of the type:

Smiles rearrangement

where X in the arene compound can be a sulfone, a sulfide, an ether or any substituent capable of dislodging from the arene carrying a negative charge. The terminal functional group in the chain end Y is able to act as a strong nucleophile for instance an alcohol, amine or thiol.

As in other nucleophilic aromatic substitutions the arene requires activation by an electron-withdrawing group preferably in the aromatic ortho position.

In one modification called the Truce–Smiles rearrangement the incoming nucleophile is sufficiently strong that the arene does not require this additional activation, for example when the nucleophile is an organolithium. This reaction is exemplified by the conversion of an aryl sulfone into a sulfinic acid by action of n-butyllithium:

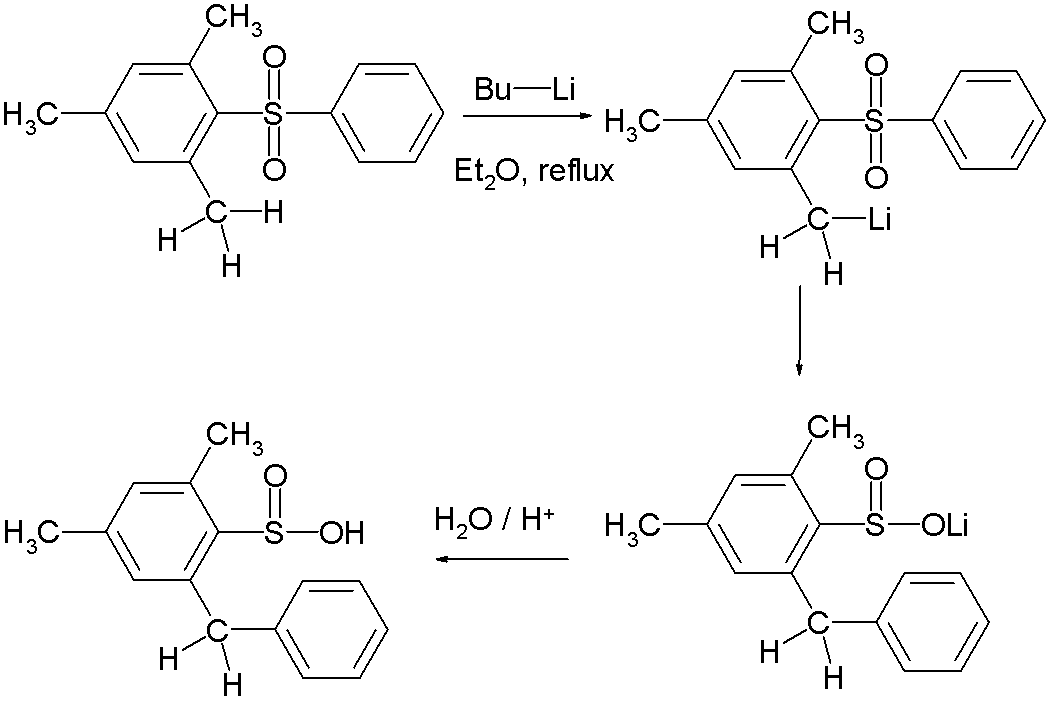
Truce–Smiles rearrangement

This particular reaction requires the interaction of the alkyllithium group ortho to the sulfone group akin a directed ortho metalation.

A conceptually related reaction is the Chapman rearrangement.

A radical version of Smiles rearrangement is reported by Stephenson in 2015.

The Hayashi rearrangement can be considered as the cationic counterpart of Smiles rearrangement.
