= Upper Jurassic deposits of Gorodishchi =

The Exposure Upper Jurassic adjournment on the right coast Kuibyshev of a water basin
- IUCN category III (natural monument or feature)
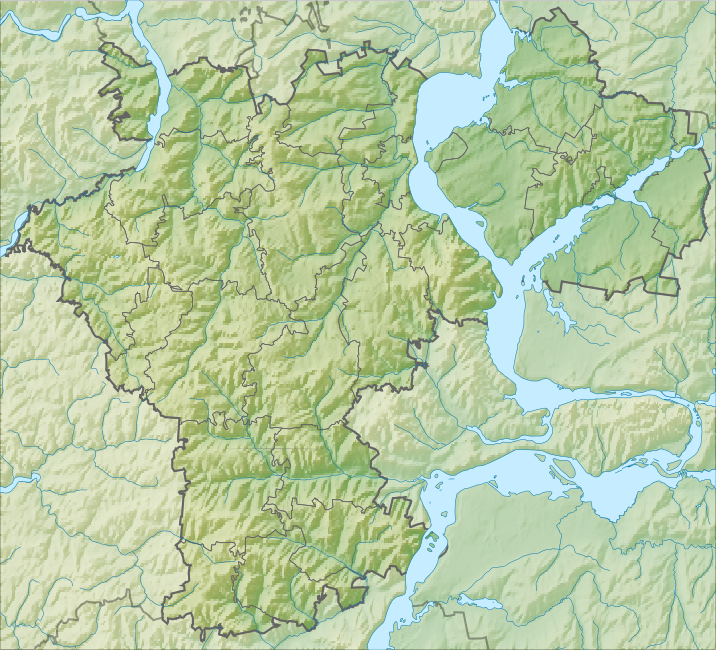
- Location within Ulyanovsk Oblast
- Location: Gorodishchi, Ulyanovsk Region, Ulyanovsk, Russia
- Coordinates: 54°34′55″N 48°25′13″E
- Area: 0.003 km^{2} (0.0012 sq mi)
- Established: 1987

The Exposed Upper Jurassic deposits (Russian: Городищенское обнажение верхнеюрских отложений) near the village of Gorodischi, Ulyanovsk Oblast on the right bank of Kuybyshev Reservoir is one of the protected areas of Ulyanovsk Oblast.

The Gorodishchi exposure is within the Ulyanovsk paleontology zakaznik. It is scientifically valuable as a basal section Upper Jurassic adjournment on Russian Platform. Many fossils have been recovered from it, including vertebrae of ichthyosaurs and plesiosaurs, and mollusc shells. The Cambrian deposits are partially covered by a landslip, and they are below the level of the Kuybyshev Reservoir.

The deposits provide an easy access to Jurassic and Cretaceous fossils. The layers consistently leaning against each other contain valuable information about evolution between the two geological periods: Jurassic and Cretaceous.
