= Beryozovsky District =

Beryozovsky District may refer to:

- Beryozovsky District, Russia, name of several districts in Russia
- Berezivskyi Raion, a district of Odesa Oblast, Ukraine
- Biaroza Raion, a district of Brest Region, Belarus
