= Wood Pearl =

Natural monument in Ulyanovsk, Russia

A Wood Pearl
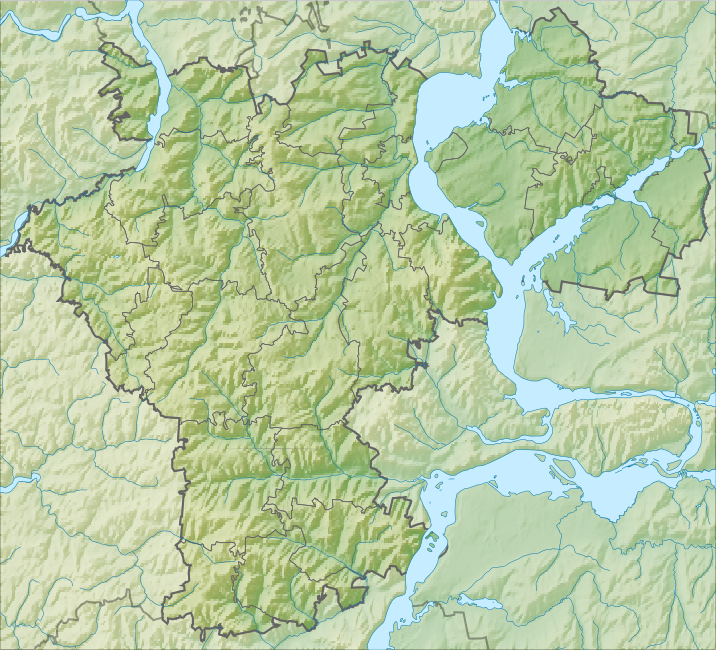
- Location within Ulyanovsk Oblast
- Location: Bolshaya Kandala, Staromaina region, Ulyanovsk, Russia
- Coordinates: 54°36′30″N 49°15′51″E
- Area: 0.1226 km^{2} (0.0473 sq mi)
- Established: 1995

Wood Pearl (Russian: Лесна́я жемчу́жина) is a natural monument (Protected areas of Ulyanovsk Oblast).

== Basic special features ==
Trees of this Protected Area belong to genetic reserve of Russia. The prime trees are pine, birch, asp and linden. The best cultivated trees are selected. Also they grow spindle trees, filbert, bearberry, savoury, carnations, rowans and ferns. All managed works are prohibited with the aim to save value vegetation. Touristic visiting is limited. Researching and scientific work is not conducing.

== The bases for creation of PA and its importance ==
Ripe pine forests, bonitet 1-1a, completeness 0,7-0,9.
