= Maksymilian Berezowski =

Journalist, author

Maksymilian Berezowski (14 May 1923 in Vilnius – 30 July 2001 in Sopot) was a Polish author, journalist, and erudite scholar.

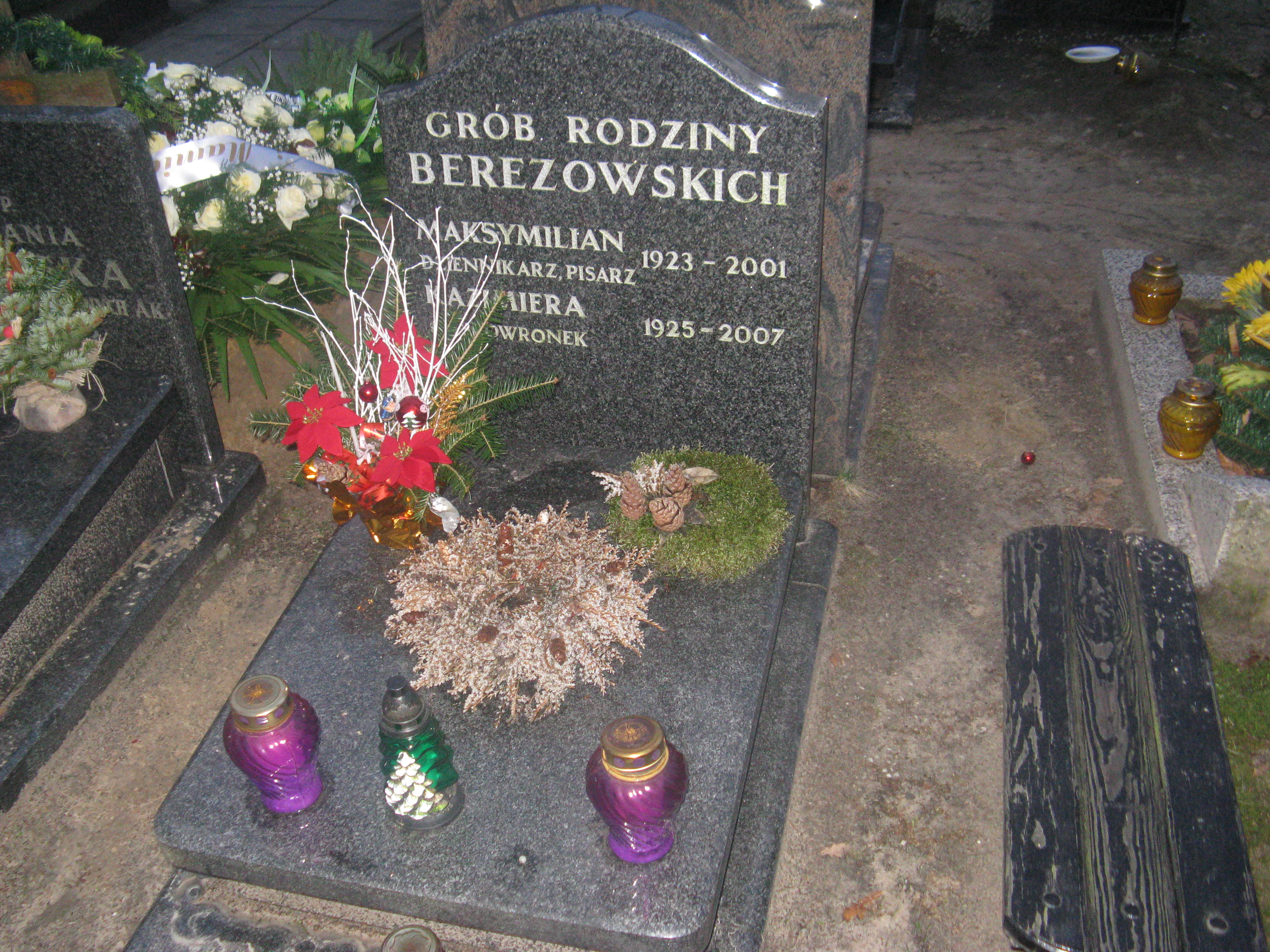
Grave in Powązki Military Cemetery

Berezowski studied at the Frunze Military Academy in Moscow and later held the rank of Major in the Polish Armed Forces.

Berezowski authored many known and widely read books. He was a popular and respected journalist specializing in international relations and politics. He served as a correspondent for Trybuna Ludu and the Polish Press Agency (PAP) and was based in from 1963 to 1965 London, as well for nine years in the United States. In 1971, he was in Canada as a visiting journalist sponsored by the Department of External Affairs. Berezowski was also a radio and television commentator. He held an IREX scholarship at the Center of International Studies at Princeton University during 1977–1978, writing The role of morality in the conduct of U.S. foreign policy.

Berezowski systematically visited the United States, refreshing his contacts and knowledge by meeting directly with sources across various U.S. administrations, which he later wrote about in his books. An example was the publication of The Career of Richard Nixon following the Watergate scandal, which described the president and interpreted the events.

== Selected books ==
Book cover Śmierć senatora

- Tysiąc i druga noc (One thousand and two nights) (1958)
- Lordowie i heretycy (Lords and Heretics) Książka i Wiedza (1966)
- Ułani i buchalterzy, czyli gwarancje dla Polski Ksiazka i Wiedza (1967)
- Wyspa dźentelmenów: dziennik korespondenta londyńskiego (Island of Gentlemen: Diary of a London Correspondent) Czytelnik (1968)
- Śmierć senatora (Death of a Senator) Czytelnik (1972)
- Kariera Richarda Nixona (The Career of Richard Nixon) Książka i Wiedza (1976)
- Trzy Kobiety I Prezydent (Three Women and a President) Wydaw. Min. Obrony Narodowej (1976)
- Bóg kocha Amerykę (God Loves America) Ksiazka i Wiedza (1978)
- Moralitet z amerykańskim aniołem (Morality play with an American Angel) Ksiazka i Wiedza (1981)
- Czas Reagana (The Time of Reagan) Ksiazka i Wiedza (1982) ISBN 83-05-11151-2
- Koniecznie skandal (Necessarily Scandal) (1982) ISBN 978-83-05-11116-4
- Ameryka pięknych snów (America of Beautiful Dreams) Ksiazka i Wiedza (1989) ISBN 978-83-05-12220-7
- Koniec epoki: wywiady Maksymiliana Berezowskiego (End of Epoch: Maksymilian Berezowski's Interviews) (1991) ISBN 978-83-85299-10-3 (Six major party figures, including Jaruzelski)
- Ostatni imperator: cesarz, który był bogiem (Last Emperor: Caesar who was God) Instytut Prasy i Wydawnictw "Novum" (1991) ISBN 978-83-85299-01-1
- Seks, łzy i polityka (Sex, tears, and politics) (1992) Polska Oficyna Wydawnicza "BGW" ISBN 978-83-7066-450-3
- Ameryka: nowy leksykon (America: a New Lexicon) Wydawn. "atla 2" (1998) ISBN 978-83-86882-21-2
- Krótka encyklopedia USA (Short encyclopedia of the USA) Dom Wydawniczy Elipsa (2001) ISBN 978-83-7151-427-2
