= Janusz Brzozowski =

Janusz Brzozowski is the name of:

- Janusz Brzozowski (handballer) (born 1951), Polish handball player
- Janusz Brzozowski (computer scientist) (1935–2019), Polish-Canadian computer scientist
