= Thiram =

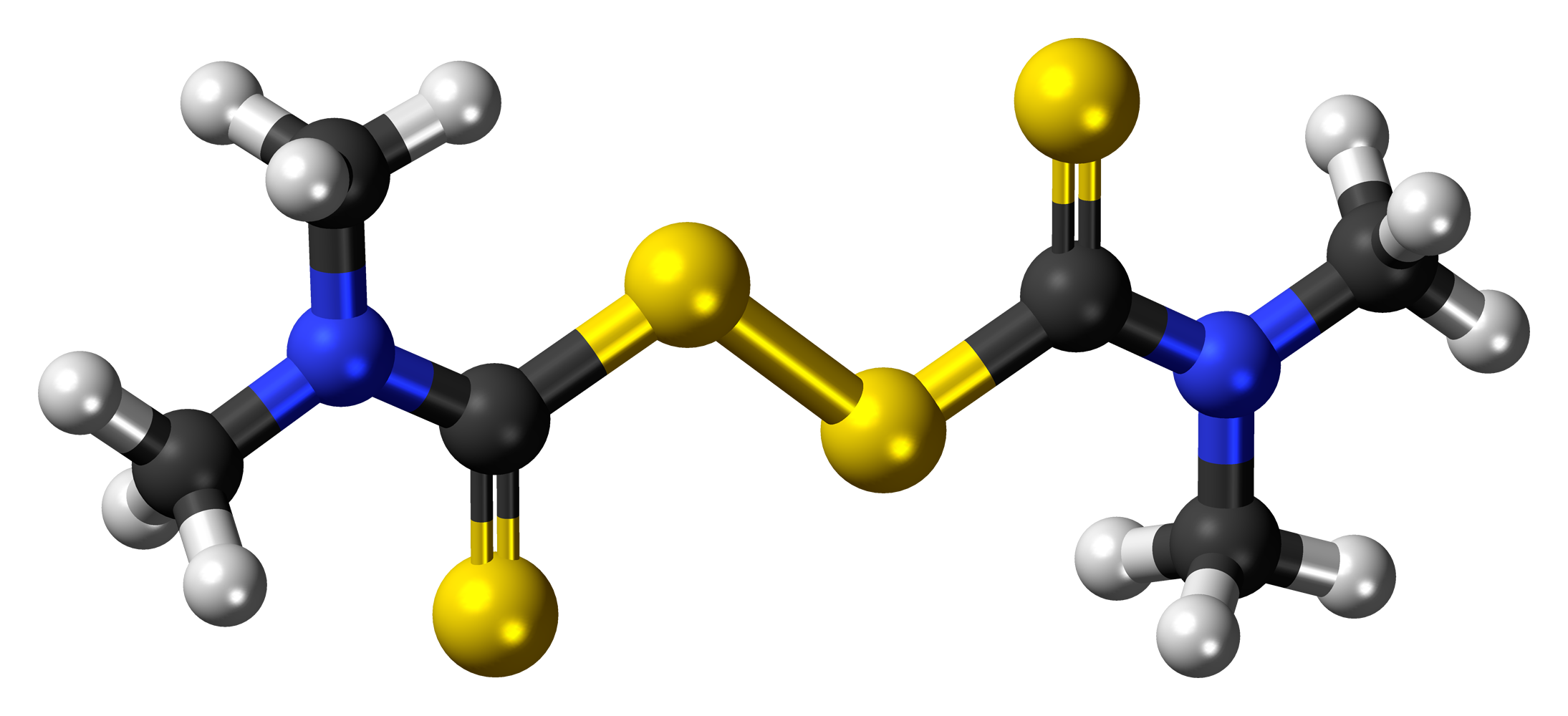

Names
- Preferred IUPAC name Dimethylcarbamothioic dithioperoxyanhydride

Identifiers
| CAS Number | 137-26-8 |
| 3D model (JSmol) | Interactive image |
| ChEBI | CHEBI:9495 |
| ChemSpider | 5256 |
| ECHA InfoCard | 100.004.806 |
| KEGG | D06114 |
| PubChem CID | 5455 |
| UNII | 0D771IS0FH |
| CompTox Dashboard (EPA) | DTXSID5021332 |
- InChI: InChI=1S/C6H12N2S4/c1-7(2)5(9)11-12-6(10)8(3)4/h1-4H3 Key: KUAZQDVKQLNFPE-UHFFFAOYSA-N; InChI=1/C6H12N2S4/c1-7(2)5(9)11-12-6(10)8(3)4/h1-4H3 Key: KUAZQDVKQLNFPE-UHFFFAOYAK
- SMILES: CN(C)C(=S)SSC(=S)N(C)C

Properties
| Chemical formula | C_{6}H_{12}N_{2}S_{4} |
| Molar mass | 240.42 g·mol^{−1} |
| Appearance | White to yellow crystalline powder |
| Odor | Characteristic |
| Density | 1.29 g/cm^{3} |
| Melting point | 155 to 156 °C (311 to 313 °F; 428 to 429 K) |
| Boiling point | decomposes |
| Solubility in water | 30 mg/L |
| Vapor pressure | 0.000008 mmHg (20 °C) |

Pharmacology
| ATC code | P03AA05 (WHO) |

Hazards
| Flash point | 138 °C (280 °F) |
- Lethal dose or concentration (LD, LC)
| LD_{50} (median dose) | 1350 mg/kg (mouse, oral); 210 mg/kg (rabbit, oral); 560 mg/kg (rat, oral) |
| LC_{50} (median concentration) | 500 mg/m^{3} (rat, 4 hr) |
- NIOSH (US health exposure limits)
| PEL (Permissible) | TWA 5 mg/m^{3} |
| REL (Recommended) | TWA 5 mg/m^{3} |
| IDLH (Immediate danger) | 100 mg/m^{3} |
- Except where otherwise noted, data are given for materials in their standard state (at 25 °C [77 °F], 100 kPa). verify (what is ?) Infobox references

Thiram is an organosulfur compound that is used as a fungicide. It is used as a fungicide, ectoparasiticide to prevent fungal diseases in seed and crops and similarly as an animal repellent to protect fruit trees and ornamentals from damage by rabbits, rodents and deer. It is effective against Stem gall of coriander, damping off, smut of millet, neck rot of onion, etc. Thiram has been used in the treatment of human scabies, as a sun screen and as a bactericide applied directly to the skin or incorporated into soap.

Thiram is also used as a sulfur source and secondary accelerator the sulfur vulcanization of rubbers.

== Usage ==
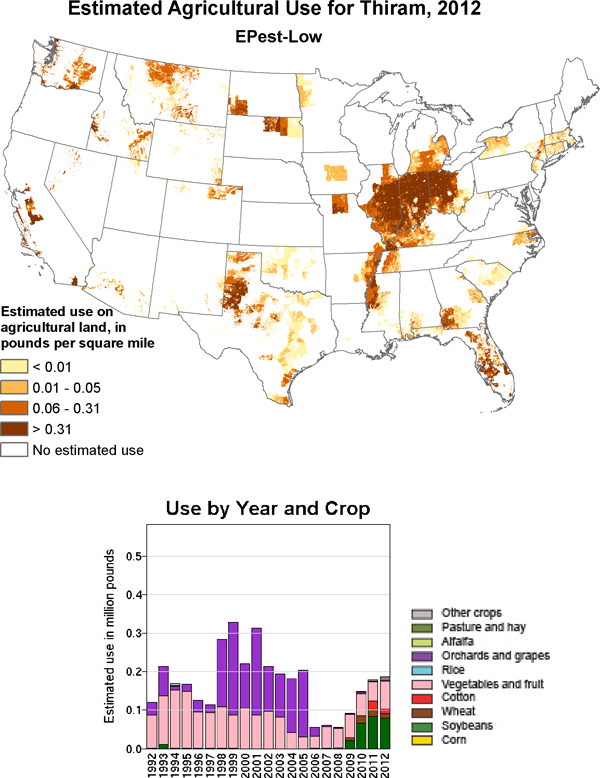
Map of agricultural use in the U.S. (2012)

Thiram was traditionally used in apple and wine farming. Since 2010 most thiram is applied to soybeans.

It is registered for use in India.

== Chemical properties ==
Thiram is classified as a thiuram disulfide, which are compounds with the functional group]] N-C(S)-S-S-C(S)-N. Specifically thiram is the oxidized dimer of dimethyldithiocarbamate.

2 (CH_{3})_{2}NCS_{2}Na + H_{2}O_{2} → (CH_{3})_{2}NCS_{2}−SC(S)N(CH_{3})_{2} + 2 NaOH

It soluble in chloroform, acetone, and ether. The pure compound is a white solid. Many other thiuram disulfides are available. Commercial samples, which can appear off-white, are available as dust, flowable, wettable powder, water-dispersible granules, and water suspension formulations and in mixtures with other fungicides.

Thiram is nearly immobile in clay soils or in soils of high organic matter. It is not expected to contaminate groundwater because of its in-soil half life of 15 days, in addition to its tendency to adhere to soil particles.

As a waste, thiram carries an U.S. EPA U244 code.

== Toxicity ==
Thiram is moderately toxic by ingestion, but it is highly toxic if inhaled. Acute exposure in humans may cause headaches, dizziness, fatigue, nausea, diarrhea, and other gastrointestinal complaints.

Chronic or repeated exposure may cause sensitive skin, and it may have effects on the thyroid or liver.
