= David Berezovski =

David Berezovski (Yiddish: דוד בערעזאָװסקי; 1896–1943) was a journalist, writer, translator and newspaper editor active in Vilnius and Grodno in the 1920s and 1930s. He is best known for being editor of the Grodno newspaper Grodner moment, later known as Undzer grodner expres and then as Nayer grodner moment, from 1924 to 1939. He was killed in The Holocaust in 1943, possibly at the Treblinka extermination camp.

== Biography ==
Berezovski was born in 1896 in Meletch, Troksky Uyezd, Vilna Governorate, Russian Empire (now Merkinė, Lithuania). His father Nakhman was a lumber merchant who gave him a basic Jewish education; his mother was named Rivke. He then studied at a Gymnasium in Vilnius, and he also started but never completed university studies in Germany, the Soviet Union, and at the University of Vilna.

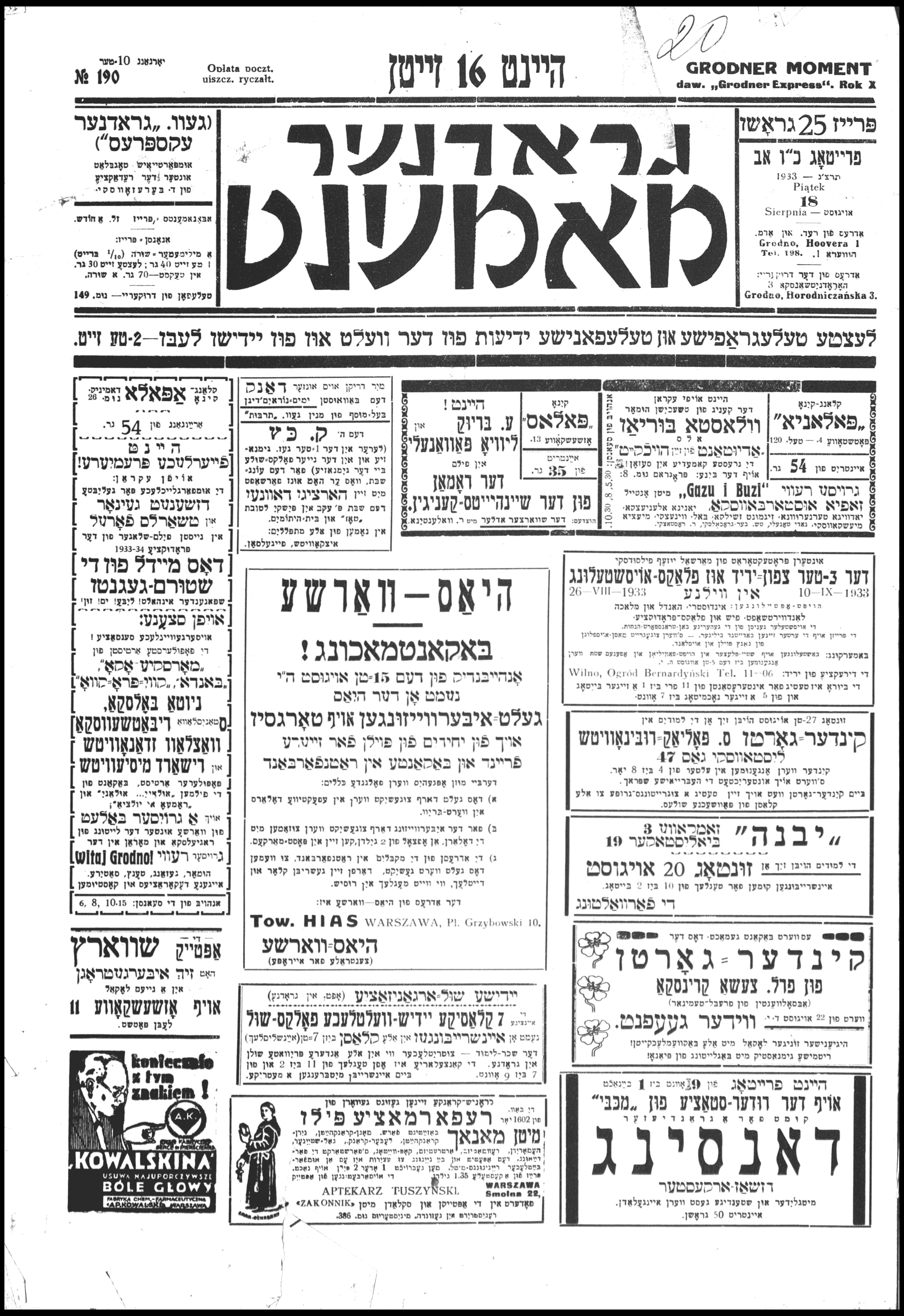
Grodner Moment, Yiddish-language newspaper front page on 18 August 1933

He seems to have got his start in journalism writing for student newspapers, and then contributing to newspapers in Vilnius during the period of German occupation following the end of World War I. He was soon regularly contributing feuilletons, articles, and humorous sketches to the Yiddish language press there, especially to the Vilner tog. He would sometimes write these pieces pseudonymously under names such as Dovidl or Dudl. In the early 1920s he also translated a handful of Maxim Gorky's books into Yiddish and published them in Vilnius, including My Childhood in 1920 and Mother in 1922. And he was involved in education and in the publishing of children's educational materials; he himself also translated some popular scientific and historical works from Russian into Yiddish. In 1924 he became editor of the newly founded Yiddish-language Grodno newspaper Grodner moment (גראָדנער מאָמענט, also known in later years as Undzer grodner expres and then as Nayer grodner moment). He used the paper as a platform to criticize the government and examine the life of local Jews in more detail. The inner pages of the newspaper seem to have consisted of news from Warsaw newspapers. In the late 1920s he also ran for municipal office but does not seem to have been elected.

Berezovski was also a supporter of the Yiddish theatre. In the 1930s he regularly collaborated with comedian Yitzhak Azarkh to bring Yiddish theatre troupes to Grodno. He also regularly wrote reviews of the Yiddish theatre. His newspaper was closed during the Soviet invasion of Poland in 1939, on the same day that the Red Army entered Grodno. After that he was reduced to working for the Belarusian paper Svobodnaya Belarus, transcribing radio broadcasts of news stories. But even that job disappeared after he was denounced in an open letter as the former editor of a "fascist" newspaper.

Grodno was invaded by German forces in June 1941 and its Jewish residents were forced into the Grodno Ghetto by November. He then worked in an infirmary with his daughter Basya. The two of them, along with David's wife Kunie, were deported to the Treblinka extermination camp in 1943 where they are all thought to have been killed, although David's exact place of death is not well documented.

== Selected works ==
- Der bazigṭer oḳean: a ḳapiṭl in der geshikhṭe fun Holand (translation of a Vasily Nemirovich-Danchenko book, 1921)
- Di bahershung fun yaboshe, yam un lufṭ (1921)
- Mitsraim: miṭ ilusṭratsyes (1921)
- Freylekhe geshikhṭes: a zamlbukh far ḳleyne ḳinder: miṭ fil ilusṭratsyes (1922)
- Di muter: roman in tsvey teyln (a translation of Maxim Gorky's Mother, 1922)
- Sparṭaḳ: der ḳamf fun di Roymishe ḳnekhṭ far frayheyṭ
