= Thiuram disulfide =

Class of chemical compounds

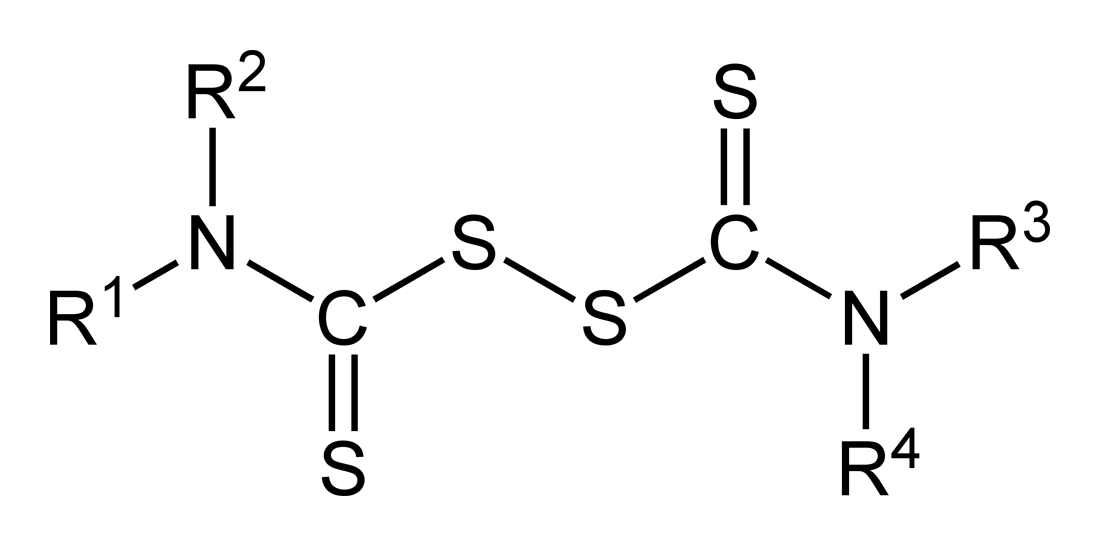
General structure of a thiuram disulfide

Thiuram disulfides are a class of organosulfur compounds with the formula (R_{2}NCSS)_{2}. Many examples are known, but popular ones include R = Me and R = Et. They are disulfides obtained by oxidation of the dithiocarbamates. These compounds are used in sulfur vulcanization of rubber as well as in the manufacture of pesticides and drugs. They are typically white or pale yellow solids that are soluble in organic solvents.

== Structure ==
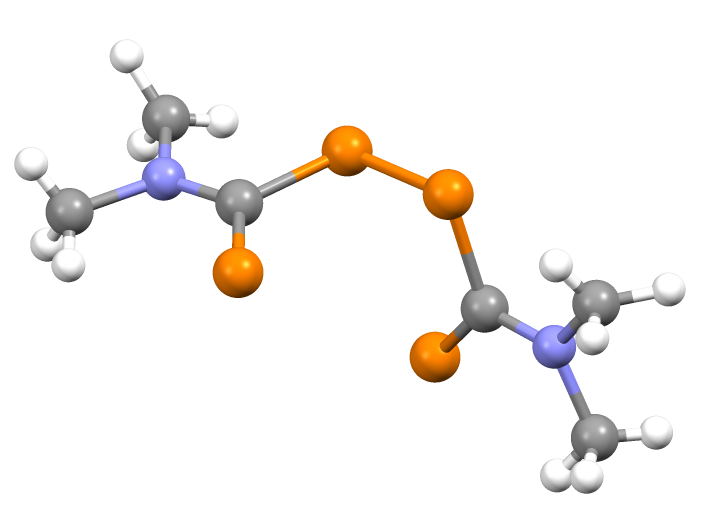
Structure of tetramethylthiuram disulfide, emphasizing the 90º dihedral angle between the two planar subunits

Thiuram disulfides feature planar dithiocarbamate subunits, which are linked by an S−S bond of 2.00 Å. The C(S)−N bond is short (1.33 Å), indicative of multiple bonding. The dihedral angle between the two dithiocarbamate subunits approaches 90°.

== Preparation and reactions ==
Thiuram disulfides are prepared by oxidizing the salts of the corresponding dithiocarbamates (e.g. sodium diethyldithiocarbamate). Typical oxidants employed include chlorine and hydrogen peroxide:

2 (C_{2}H_{5})_{2}NCS_{2}Na + H_{2}O_{2} → (C_{2}H_{5})_{2}NC(S)−S_{2}−C(S)N(C_{2}H_{5})_{2} + 2 NaOH

Thiuram disulfides react with Grignard reagents to give esters of dithiocarbamic acid, as in the preparation of methyl dimethyldithiocarbamate:

[Me_{2}NC(S)S]_{2} + MeMgX → Me_{2}NC(S)SMe + Me_{2}NCS_{2}MgX

Thiuram disulfides are weak oxidants. They can be reduced to dithiocarbamates. Treatment of a thiuram disulfide with triphenylphosphine, or with cyanide salts, yields the corresponding dithiuram monosulfides:

(R_{2}NC(S)S)_{2} + PPh_{3} → (R_{2}NCS)_{2}S + S=PPh_{3}

Chlorination of thiuram disulfide affords the thiocarbamoyl chloride.

== Applications ==
The tetramethyl derivative, known as thiram, is a widely used fungicide. The tetraethyl derivative, known as disulfiram, is commonly used to treat chronic alcoholism. It produces an acute sensitivity to alcohol ingestion by blocking metabolism of acetaldehyde by acetaldehyde dehydrogenase, leading to a higher concentration of the aldehyde in the blood, which in turn produces symptoms of a severe hangover.

== Safety ==
In 2005–06, thiuram mix was the 13th most prevalent allergen in patch tests (3.9%).
