= Cyclohexylthiophthalimide =

cyclohexylthiophthalimide

Names
- Preferred IUPAC name 2-(Cyclohexylsulfanyl)-1H-isoindole-1,3(2H)-dione

Identifiers
CAS Number	17796-82-6
3D model (JSmol)	Interactive image
Abbreviations	CTP
ChemSpider	26768
ECHA InfoCard	100.037.961
EC Number	2417741
PubChem CID	28777
UNII	50Z9596NJ3
CompTox Dashboard (EPA)	DTXSID8027793
- InChI: InChI=1S/C14H15NO2S/c16-13-11-8-4-5-9-12(11)14(17)15(13)18-10-6-2-1-3-7-10/h4-5,8-10H,1-3,6-7H2 Key: UEZWYKZHXASYJN-UHFFFAOYSA-N; InChI=1/C14H15NO2S/c16-13-11-8-4-5-9-12(11)14(17)15(13)18-10-6-2-1-3-7-10/h4-5,8-10H,1-3,6-7H2 Key: UEZWYKZHXASYJN-UHFFFAOYAT
- SMILES: O=C3c1ccccc1C(=O)N3SC2CCCCC2

Properties
Chemical formula	C_{14}H_{15}NO_{2}S
Molar mass	261.34 g·mol^{−1}
Appearance	Colourless solid
Melting point	90 °C (194 °F; 363 K)
- Except where otherwise noted, data are given for materials in their standard state (at 25 °C [77 °F], 100 kPa). verify (what is ?) Infobox references

Cyclohexylthiophthalimide (abbreviated CTP) is an organosulfur compound that is used in production of rubber. It is a white solid, although commercial samples often appear yellow. It features the sulfenamide functional group, being a derivative of phthalimide and cyclohexanethiol. In the production of synthetic rubber, CTP impedes the onset of sulfur vulcanization.
