= Nicolai Berezowsky =

Russian-American violinist and composer

Nicolai Tikhonovich Berezowsky (May 17, 1900 – August 27, 1953) was a Russian-American violinist and composer.

He was born in St. Petersburg, Russia on May 17, 1900, graduating from the Imperial Capella with honors when he was sixteen. As a young boy singer in the chapel choir, he performed for the Tsar's family and Rasputin. In the book Duet with Nicky, he recalled how the choirboys would tear pages from their hymnals to make spit-balls which they would aim at Rasputin. He later served as musical director of the School of Modern Art in Moscow and as first violinist at the Moscow Grand Opera. In 1922, he made a harrowing escape from the Soviet Union in disguise, only to be arrested in Poland, but was released by an official who remembered hearing him play. Once settled in New York, Berezowsky attended the Juilliard School of Music, studying under Paul Kochanski and Rubin Goldmark. He was first violinist with the New York Philharmonic for the first seven years of his U.S. residence. He played in the Coolidge String Quartet from 1935 to 1940. He was a protégé of Serge Koussevitzky, who premiered his symphonies to great acclaim.

He married Alice Newman, a notable pianist, who later published a memoir, "Duet with Nicky", about their early years together (Lippincott). Alice was the sister of chemist Melvin Spencer Newman and the granddaughter of New Orleans investment banker and philanthropist Isidore Newman. They had two children. His second wife was Judith Berezowsky. He died on August 27, 1953, in New York.

Among Berezowsky's works are an opera, Prince Batrak, four symphonies, concertos for harp, violin and 'cello, and many diverse works of chamber music. His recordings include an LP set of Mussorgsky's Boris Godunov, which he conducted. He enjoyed a great success with his children's opera Babar and his oratorio Gilgamesh. His Concerto for Harp was commissioned by Edna Phillips, who gave the premiere with the Philadelphia Orchestra, and was performed by Carlos Salzedo with the National Orchestra Association under Léon Barzin with an original cadenza by Salzedo, included in the edition published by Theodore Presser. It was not performed again until performances by Saul Davis Zlatkovski in recital and with the St. Paul J.C.C. Symphony Orchestra under James Riccardo in 1990.

== Selected works ==
- Symphony No. 1, Op. 12
- Symphony No. 2, Op. 18
- Symphony No. 3, Op. 21
- Symphony No. 4, Op. 29
- Sinfonietta for orchestra, Op. 17
- Christmas Festival Overture (Ukrainian Noel) (1943)
- Soldiers on the Town (1943)
- Fantasy (piano duo and orchestra)(1944)
- Suite Hebraïque, Op. 3, orchestra
- Introduction and Allegro for small orchestra, Op. 8
- Sextet Concerto (1951)
- Concerto for clarinet or viola and orchestra, Op. 28
- Concerto Lirico for cello and orchestra, Op. 19
- Violin Concerto, Op. 14
- Concerto for Harp and Orchestra, Op. 31
- Suite No. 2 (woodwind quintet)
- Toccata, Variations, and Finale, Op. 23
- Duo for clarinet and viola, Op. 15
- Gilgamesh, Cantata for narrator, solo voices, mixed chorus and orchestra
- Babar the Elephant, Children's opera in one act, five scenes (1953)

== Sources ==
- New York Times obituary, published August 28, 1953
- Note from the published edition of his Brass Suite for Seven Instruments, Op. 24
