= Sulfenamide =

Molecules of the form >N–S–

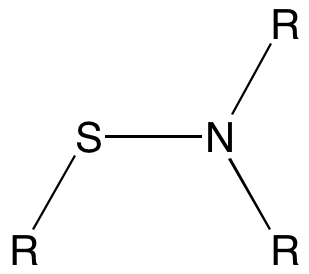
General structure of a sulfenamide

In organosulfur chemistry, sulfenamides (also spelled sulphenamides) are a class of organosulfur compounds characterized by the general formula R−S−N(−R)_{2}, where the R groups are hydrogen, alkyl, or aryl. Sulfenamides have been used extensively in the vulcanization of rubber using sulfur. They are related to the oxidized compounds known as sulfinamides (RS(O)NR_{2}) and sulfonamides (RS(O)_{2}NR_{2}).

== Applications ==
Captan, a fungicide, is an commercially important sulfenamide.

Sulfenamides, e.g. cyclohexylthiophthalimide, are used extensively in the vulcanization of rubber. The sulfenamides are used to accelerate the process via the transient formation of labile S-N bonds. The substituents on the sulfenamides determine the point at which they will become active. Temperature dependent activation of sulfenamide accelerants is useful in the vulcanization process because the temperature at which the rubber polymerizes determines the length of the sulfur chains, and properties such as the elasticity of the final product.

== Preparation ==
Sulfenamides are usually prepared by the reaction of sulfenyl chlorides and amines:

RSCl + R'_{2}NH → RSNR'_{2} + HCl

The S-N bond formation generally obeys standard bimolecular nucleophilic substitution rules, with the basic nitrogen centre the nucleophile. In one illustrative synthesis, triphenylmethanesulphenyl chloride and butylamine react in benzene at 25 C:

Ph_{3}CSCl + 2BuNH_{2} → Ph_{3}CSN(H)Bu + BuNH_{3}Cl

Several other sources of "RS^{+}" also can attack amines. Primary through tertiary amines react with thiols, disulfides, and sulfenyl thiocyanates. In some cases, silver ion mediates the substitution:

RSSR + 2R'_{2}NH + Ag^{+} → RSNR'_{2} + AgSR + R'_{2}NH_{2}^{+}

Primary sulfenamide formation between sulfenyl halides and ammonia as detailed above occurs only whenever R is electron-withdrawing or large. Otherwise primary sulfenamides usually add a second sulfenyl moiety:

RSCl + NH_{3} → (RS)_{2}NH + NH_{4}Cl

== Structure ==
Sulfenamides have been characterized by X-ray crystallography. The S-N bond in sulfenamides is a chiral axis that leads to formation of diastereomeric compounds. The existence of these distinct stereoisomers is due to the formation of a partial double bond between either sulfur or nitrogen's lone pair and the other atom's antibonding orbitals. Additionally bulky substituent groups and lone pair repulsion can contribute resistance to interconversion. The resulting torsional barriers can be quite large and vary from 12-20 kcal/mol. The interactions are thought to be dependent on the torsional preferences (also known as the gauche effect). The nitrogen atom is usually pyramidal, but cyclic and strongly steric hindered acyclic sulfenamides can display a planar arrangement of bonds around the nitrogen atom.

== Reactions ==
The S-N bond in sulfenamides are labile in a variety of ways. The sulfur atom tends to be the more electrophilic center of the S-N bond. Nucleophilic attack on sulfur can occur by amines, by thiols, and by alkyl-magnesium halides which leads to either new sulfenamide compounds or back to starting compounds such as sulfides and disulfides respectively. Both the nitrogen and sulfur atoms comprising the S-N bond in sulfenamides have lone pairs of electrons in their outer shells, one and two for nitrogen and sulfur respectively. These lone pairs allow for the possibility of forming either higher order bonds(double, triple) or adding new substituent groups to the compound. For instance, the nitrogen in the S-N bond of 2-hydroxysulfenanilides can oxidize to an imine species with sodium dichromate.

Lead dioxide oxidizes primary sulfenamides to metastable thiamino radicals (R–N^{•}–S–R′), which decompose over a period of months.

Sulfenamides react with amino-azaheterocycles to form heterocyclic systems (often used as amino protecting groups in various other synthesis reactions). Chlorocarbonylsulfenyl chloride (ClCOSCl) also readily forms S-N bonds with 2-amino-azaheterocycles, but always of a cyclical nature.

A variant of the Appel reaction has been noted for sulfenamides. Reaction of o-nitrobenzenesulfenamide with PPh_{3} and CCl_{4} leads the formation of o-nitro-N-(triphenylphosphoranylidene)-benzenesulfenamide. In this variant reaction, the triphenyl phosphine forms a double bonded linkage with nitrogen in the sulfenamide instead of oxygen as is customary in the Appel reaction. Additionally in the traditional Appel reaction, the R-OH bond is cleaved leaving oxygen attached to triphenylphosphine. In this variant, the S-N bond is not cleaved.
