= Kuzovatovo (urban locality) =

Kuzovatovo Кузоватово
- Urban-type settlement
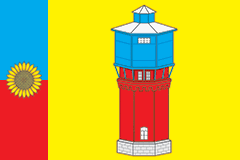
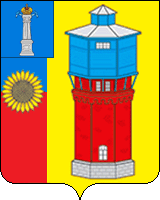
- Flag Coat of arms
- Interactive map of Kuzovatovo
- Location of Kuzovatovo Kuzovatovo (Ulyanovsk Oblast)
- Coordinates: 53.5591°N 47.6216°E
- Country: Russia
- Federal subject: Ulyanovsk Oblast
- Administrative district: Kuzovatovsky District
- Founded: 1898

Population (2010 Census)
  - Total: 8,022
  - Estimate (2021): 7,325 (−8.7%)
- Time zone: UTC+4 (UTC+04:00)
- Postal code: 433760
- OKTMO ID: 73616151051

Kuzovatovo (Russian: Кузова́тово) is an urban locality (an urban-type settlement) in Kuzovatovsky District of Ulyanovsk Oblast, Russia. Population: 8,022 (2010 census); 8,683 (2002 census); 8,034 (1989 Soviet census).
