= Liliana Berezowsky =

Canadian artist

Liliana Berezowsky (born April 22, 1944) is a Canadian artist and educator. She is known for her gallery exhibitions and public sculptures.

== Early life and education ==
Born to Ukrainian parents in Kraków, Poland her family emigrated to Canada in 1948. She attended elementary and high schools at Branksome Hall in Toronto. Post secondary education was at the following: University of Toronto, where she received her B.A. degree, majoring in sociology; John Abbott College, Montreal, where she received a diploma in ceramics technology. She then studied fine art at Concordia University, receiving a BFA degree in 1984 and a Master of Fine Arts degree in 1989.

There have been numerous solo and group exhibitions of her work. She taught sculpture and drawing at: Concordia University, Montreal (1988–1924); McGill University (1988); and the Saidye Bronfman Centre (1989–1990). Her awards include: Concordia University Graduate Fellowship (1986) (1987) (1988); Fonds F.C.A.R. Que. (1986) (1987) (1988); Concordia Teaching Fellowship (1988–1989); and many Canada Council Grants and grants from the Ministry of Culture and the Council of Arts and letters in Quebec (CALQ). After 30 years in downtown Montreal she now lives in Lavaltrie, Quebec.

== Collections ==
Her work is included in the collections of the Musée national des beaux-arts du Québec, the City of Montreal public Art collection, the National Gallery of Canada, the Museum of Fine Arts, Montreal, the Museum of Contemporary Art, Montreal, Lachine Museum, Musée de Joliette, Kamloops Art gallery, Laurentian University Museum, Norman Mckensie Art gallery, ETS Montreal and Hydro Quebec
