= Chapman rearrangement =

Named after	Arthur William Chapman
Reaction type	Rearrangement reaction

Identifiers
RSC ontology ID	RXNO:0000514

The Chapman rearrangement is the thermal conversion of aryl N-arylbenzimidates to the corresponding amides, via intramolecular migration of an aryl group from oxygen to nitrogen. It is named after Arthur William Chapman, who first described it, and is conceptually similar to the Newman–Kwart rearrangement.

Chapman Rearrangement
