= Julia Niewiarowska-Brzozowska =

Julia Niewiarowska-Brzozowska (1827–1891) was a Polish Romantic era composer. She was born in Warsaw.

== Biography ==
She was the sister of Karol Brzozowski. She studied music with August Freyer in Warsaw. In 1845–1848 she performed in Berlin and Warsaw. After marrying the writer Aleksander Niewiarowski, she ran an art salon in Warsaw. She is buried in the Powązki Cemetery in Warsaw.
