= Induction period =

Time interval between cause and measurable effect

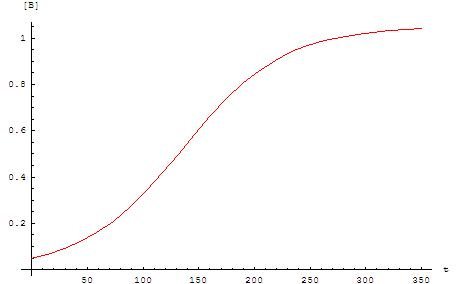
A sigmoid curve of an autocatalytic reaction. When t = 0 to 50, the rate of reaction is low. Thereafter, the reaction accelerates, until almost all reactants have been consumed. At that point, the reaction rate tapers off.

An induction period in chemical kinetics is an initial slow stage of a chemical reaction; after the induction period, the reaction accelerates. Ignoring induction periods can lead to runaway reactions.

In some catalytic reactions, a pre-catalyst needs to undergo a transformation to form the active catalyst, before the catalyst can take effect. Time is required for this transformation, hence the induction period. For example, with Wilkinson's catalyst, one triphenylphosphine ligand must dissociate to give the coordinatively unsaturated 14-electron species which can participate in the catalytic cycle:

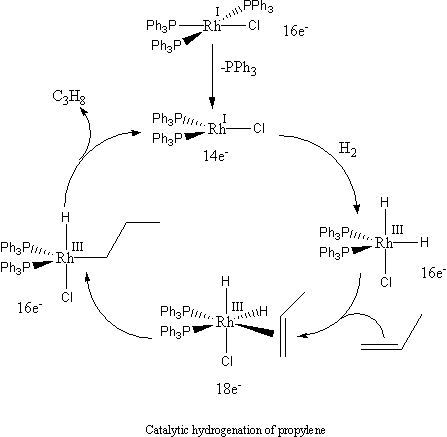
Wilkinson's catalyst requires activation before it can participate in the catalytic cycle

Similarly, for an autocatalytic reaction, where one of the reaction products catalyzes the reaction itself, the rate of reaction is low initially until sufficient products have formed to catalyze the reaction.

Reactions generally accelerate when heat is applied. Where a reaction is exothermic, the rate of the reaction may initially be low. As the reaction proceeds, heat is generated, and the rate of reaction increases. This type of reaction often exhibits an induction period as well.

The reactions to form Grignard reagents are notorious for having induction periods. This is usually due to two reasons: Firstly, the thin film of oxide on the magnesium reagent must be removed before the bulk magnesium can react. Secondly, Grignard reactions, while exothermic, are typically conducted at low temperature for better selectivity. For these two reasons, Grignard reactions often can have a long induction period, followed by a thermal runaway, even causing the reaction solvent to boil-off.
