= Great Springs =

Great springs
- IUCN category III (natural monument or feature)
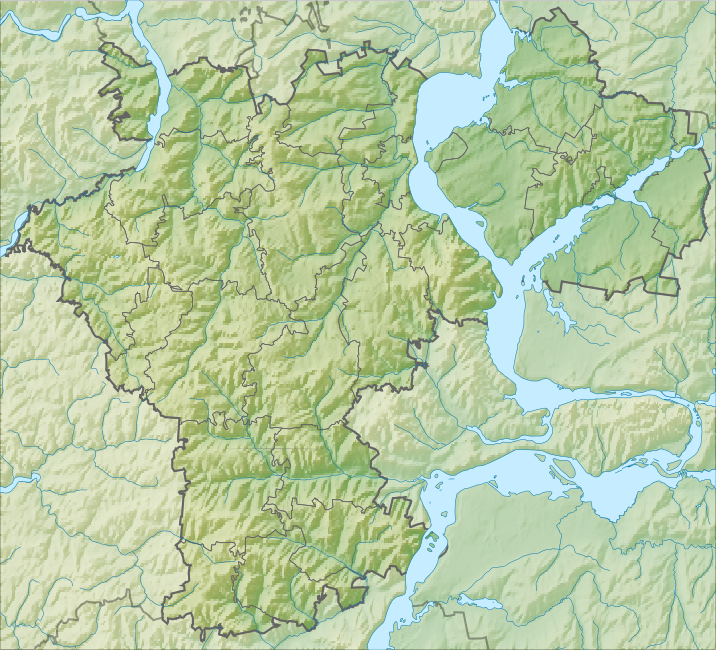
- Location within Ulyanovsk Oblast
- Location: Bazarnosyzgansky area, Ulyanovsk, Russia
- Coordinates: 53°45′33″N 46°46′06″E
- Area: 0.00015 km^{2} (5.8×10^{−5} sq mi)
- Established: 1995

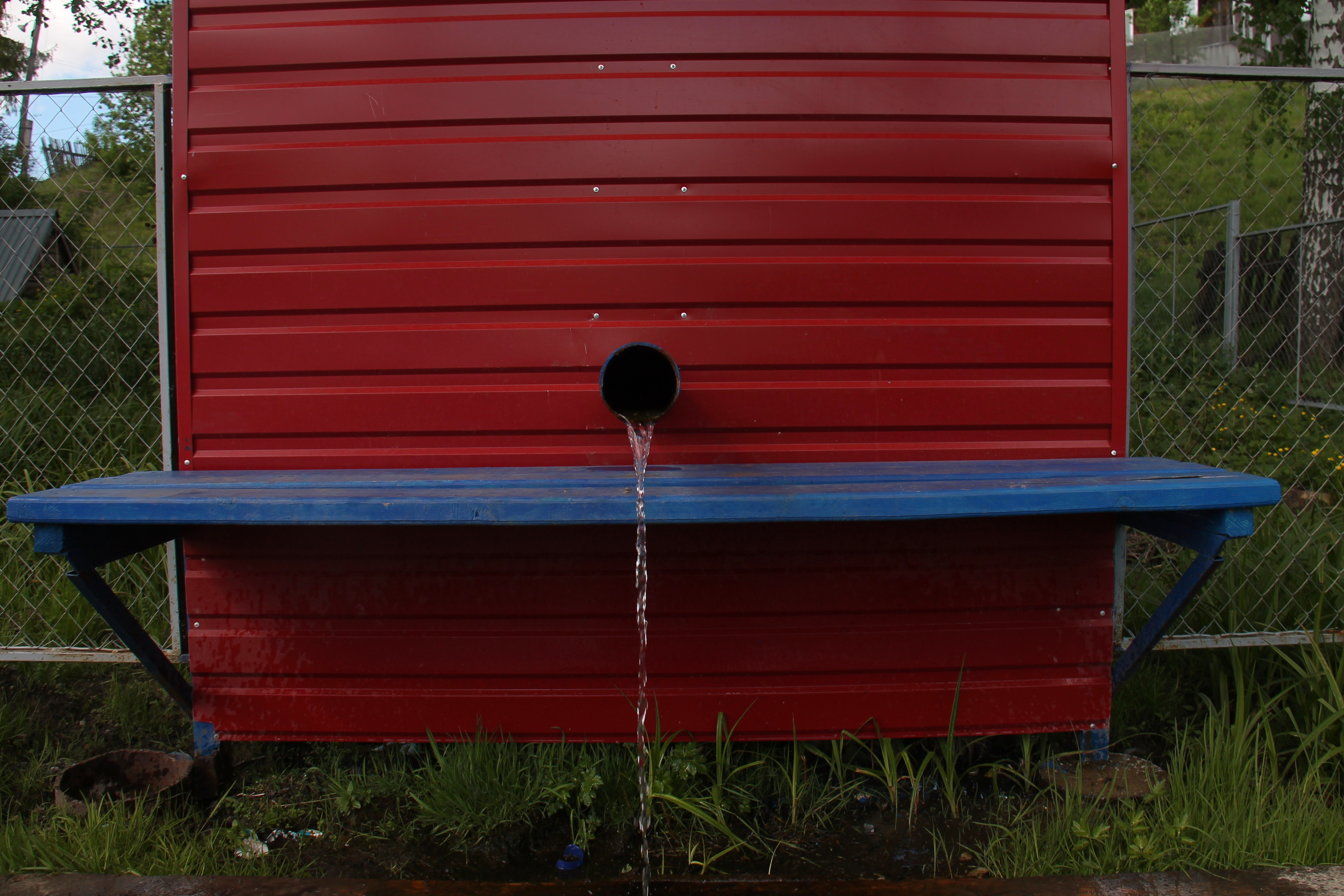
Great springs, Ulyanovsk

Great Springs (Russian: Большие родники) is a natural monument listed among the protected areas of Ulyanovsk Oblast.

The spring, located in the middle of the settled area, contains high-quality water. Polluting the spring is forbidden, as are economic or industrial activity within the protected zone. Cleaning the bed of the spring is permitted. The streams feed the rivers of the area and provide water for the population.

Due to lack of funding, no research or scientific experiments are conducted at the spring.
