= Methyl dimethyldithiocarbamate =

Names
- Preferred IUPAC name Methyl dimethylcarbamodithioate
- Other names Cystogon, DMDTM, Forbiat

Identifiers
CAS Number	3735-92-0
3D model (JSmol)	Interactive image
ChEMBL	ChEMBL504894
ChemSpider	18397
ECHA InfoCard	100.021.005
EC Number	223-105-5
PubChem CID	19526
UNII	BKH76WPU8C
CompTox Dashboard (EPA)	DTXSID40190797
- InChI: InChI=1S/C4H9NS2/c1-5(2)4(6)7-3/h1-3H3 Key: NBBZMDUHKWRYSZ-UHFFFAOYSA-N
- SMILES: CN(C)C(=S)SC

Properties
Chemical formula	(CH_{3})_{2}NC(S)SCH_{3}
Molar mass	135.24 g·mol^{−1}
Appearance	colorless or white solid
Melting point	45–47 °C (113–117 °F; 318–320 K)

Hazards
- GHS labelling
Pictograms	(GHS07: Exclamation mark)
Signal word	Warning
Hazard statements	H302, H312, H315, H319, H332, H335
Precautionary statements	P261, P264, P264+P265, P270, P271, P280, P301+P317, P302+P352, P304+P340, P305+P351+P338, P317, P319, P321, P330, P332+P317, P337+P317, P362+P364, P403+P233, P405, P501
- Except where otherwise noted, data are given for materials in their standard state (at 25 °C [77 °F], 100 kPa). Infobox references

Methyl dimethyldithiocarbamate is the organosulfur compound with the formula (CH_{3})_{2}NC(S)SCH_{3}. It is the one of simplest dithiocarbamic esters. It is a white volatile solid that is poorly soluble in water but soluble in many organic solvents. It was once used as a pesticide.

Methyl dimethyldithiocarbamate can be prepared by methylation of salts of dimethyldithiocarbamate:

(CH_{3})_{2}NCS^{−}_{2}Na^{+} + (CH_{3}O)_{2}SO_{2} → (CH_{3})_{2}NC(S)SCH_{3} + CH_{3}OSO^{−}_{3}Na^{+}

It can also be prepared by the reaction of a tetramethylthiuram disulfide with methyl Grignard reagents:

[(CH_{3})_{2}NC(S)S]_{2} + CH_{3}MgBr → (CH_{3})_{2}NC(S)SCH_{3} + (CH_{3})_{2}NCS_{2}MgBr
