= Cretaceous steppes with Caragana =

- IUCN category III (natural monument or feature)
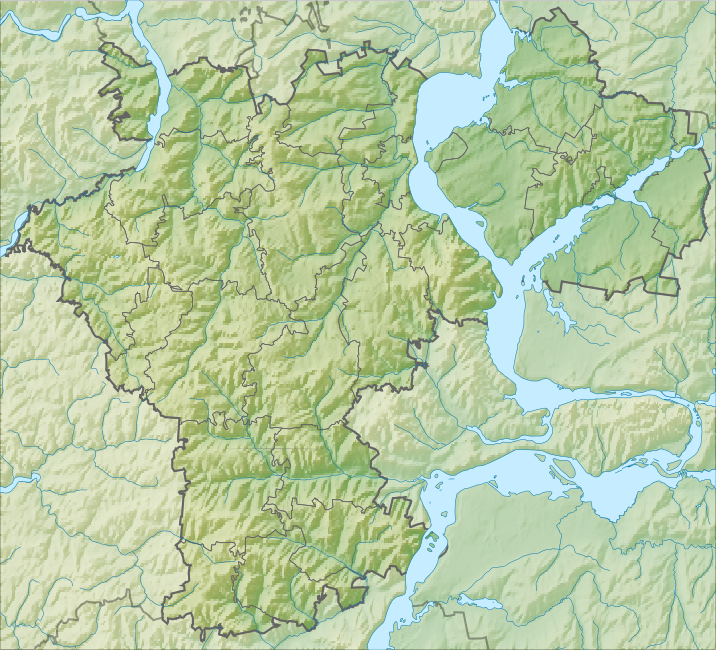
- Location within Ulyanovsk Oblast
- Location: Radishchevo region, Ulyanovsk, Russia
- Coordinates: 52°52′00″N 48°04′18″E
- Area: 0.2 km^{2} (0.077 sq mi)
- Established: 2000

The Cretaceous steppes with Caragana (Russian: Меловые степи с караганой) is a natural monument (protected areas of Ulyanovsk Oblast). It is managed by the Berezovskoe joint-stock company.

== Basic special features ==
The Cretaceous steppes with Caragana is a clearly expressed steppe with the tracks of the former forest. Most likely, there were pine-oak scaffolding with the chalky sections. Forms have migrated from this territory and the forest became a steppe. At present in the steppe there is a very rich composition of flora. Pasture and pasturing of cattle is limited because of lack of financing, research and scientific work was not conducted.

== The basis for creation of PA and its importance ==
It is available as a natural complex of rather good safety since the given forest-steppe file has improved more and became arable land.
