= Stanisław Brzozowski =

Stanisław Brzozowski may refer to:

- Stanisław Brzozowski (philosopher) (1878–1911), Polish philosopher and writer
- Stanisław Korab-Brzozowski (1876–1901), Polish poet
- Stanisław Brzozowski (mime artist) (born 1938), Polish mime artist
