= Kuzovatovsky District =

Kuzovatovsky District Кузоватовский район
- District
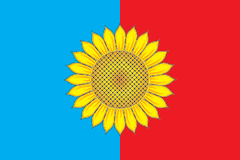
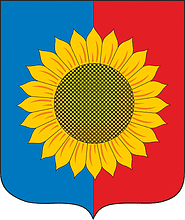
- Flag Coat of arms
- Location of Kuzovatovsky District in Ulyanovsk Oblast
- Coordinates: 53°32′47″N 47°41′01″E
- Country: Russia
- Federal subject: Ulyanovsk Oblast
- Administrative center: Kuzovatovo

Area
  - Total: 2,098 km^{2} (810 sq mi)

Population (2010 Census)
  - Total: 22,377
  - Density: 10.67/km^{2} (27.62/sq mi)
  - Urban: 35.8%
  - Rural: 64.2%

Administrative structure
  - Administrative divisions: 1 Settlement okrugs, 5 Rural okrugs
  - Inhabited localities: 1 urban-type settlements, 50 rural localities

Municipal structure
  - Municipally incorporated as: Kuzovatovsky Municipal District
  - Municipal divisions: 1 urban settlements, 5 rural settlements
- Time zone: UTC+4 (UTC+04:00)
- OKTMO ID: 73616000
- Website: http://kuzovatovo.ulregion.ru/

Kuzovatovsky District (Russian: Кузова́товский райо́н) is an administrative and municipal district (raion), one of the twenty-one in Ulyanovsk Oblast, Russia. It is located in the center of the oblast. The area of the district is 2,098 square kilometers (810 sq mi). Its administrative center is the urban locality (a work settlement) of Kuzovatovo. Population: 22,377 (2010 Census); 27,225 (2002 Census); 30,218 (1989 Soviet census). The population of Kuzovatovo accounts for 35.8% of the district's total population.
