= Igor Berezovsky =

Russian painter

- Born: Igor Borisovich Berezovsky; September 8, 1942; Omsk, Soviet Union
- Died: February 2, 2007 (aged 64); Moscow, Russia
- Occupations: Painting, graphic design

Igor Borisovitch Berezovsky (Russian: Игорь Борисович Березовский; September 8, 1942 – February 2, 2007) was a Russian painter, printmaker, and graphic designer.

== Biography ==
Igor Borisovich Berezovsky was born on 8 September 1942 in Omsk, during evacuation. He was the third child out of six. Since early childhood he liked to draw and make photos. He had always wanted to study in an art school or an art institute. However, he hadn't managed to get a formal education. Since the age of 15 he started to work, and spent three years serving in the Russian army in the Far East. His life as an artist was decided upon, when he joined the All-Union Institute for Technical Esthetics in 1967. Other employees in the Institute included philosophers Georgy Shchedrovitsky and Oleg Genisaretsky, design and architecture scholar Alexandr Yermolaev, art scholar Vladimir Paperny, saxophone player Alexei Kozlov. Elena Vsevolodovna Chernevich, and outstanding graphic design scholar and historian, played an important role in Igor Berezovsky's life and art.

Designer scene at the end of sixties and the beginning of seventies was fueled with a passionate interest towards Western pop and conceptual art. Berezovsky majored in graphic design. He not only received outstanding designer education, but also acquired a clear understanding of modern art. 1973 is the year, when he began free artistic work. His early works already demonstrate the artistic principles, which are to become his main features. A documentary-like, expressive picture. Free, expressive color. A lot of experimentation, much randomness, mistakes. Here is the paradox: everything starts with a photo—this is important, but only the photos made by the author "from within"—the transformation of the photo yields a creative result. The artist's individual manner fully matures in his still life pictures: early, simple and frankly daring. (1978–1979). In 1976 Berezovsky leaves his job at the Institute and becomes a freelance artist. In 1979 he becomes a member of the Artists' Union of the USSR. In the next year he enjoys his first personal exhibition and the Graphic Arts Complex. He earns his living by designing exhibitions (graphics, posters, catalogues), working together with such exhibition design gurus as M. Konik, E. Bogdanov, S. Chermensky. Some of his major works are: design of the national exhibition "Artists for the People", CHA, 1982; "Mayakovsky and Khlebnikov", Mayakovsky Museum, 1985; modern Soviet art exhibition "New Reality", Ravenna, 1989; exhibition "An Artist and Traditional Art", CHA, 1990.

All his life Berezovsky has been working with outer forms, and only with them. His artistic thinking avoids literature, not inclined towards symbolism, doesn't employ implications and underlying messages. He has always aimed to articulate modern vision. He was interested in the texture of TV images ("TV Parallels", 1974–77); reproduced photos from magazines and, using large dot patterns, almost eliminated them ("Reproacts", 1981); employed original textures using "stuff" at hand; paraphrased Jean-Michel Folon and Dibbets, Warhol and Dürer. He used quotation techniques long before the emergence of talks about postmodernism in this country.

== Personal exhibits ==
- 1980 Graphic Arts Complex, Moscow, Russia
- 1993 Museum of Cinema, Moscow, Russia
- 2000 Central House of Artists, Moscow, Russia
- 2005 State Tretyakov Gallery, Moscow, Russia

== Museums and private collections ==
- State Tretyakov Gallery, Москва
- Государственный Русский музей, Санкт-Петербург
- "Rosizo", Ministry of Culture of the Russian Federation
- Museum of Cinema, Москва
- Posters Museum, Warsaw
- Stedelijk Museum, Amsterdam
- Private collections in Russia, Germany, Switzerland, et al..

== Bibliography ==
- Eugeniusz Kawenczynski rozmowe z Jozefem Mroszczakiem. Kultura I zycie, № 5. Варшава, 1975
- А.Ермолаев. Технология — источник творчества. Советское фото. № 2, 1979
- Плакат, живопись, графика. Каталог выставки. Москва, 1984
- Jan Zielecki. Igor Berezowskij. Projekt, № 1. Варшава, 1988
- Интервью с Игорем Березовским. Реклама, № 4, 1988
- Arte sovietica contemporanea «Nuova realta». Каталог выставки. Ravenna, 1989
- Constantin Boym. New Russian Design. New York, Rizzoli, 1992
- Анилины и шелкографии Игоря Березовского. 1970—1980 — 1990-е. Каталог выставки. Москва, 1993
- Собрание произведений искусства АО «Мосэкспо». Каталог выставки. Москва, 1993
- Who's Who in Graphic Design. Zurich, Benteli-Werd Verlags AG, 1994
- Елена Черневич. Не обязательно плыть по течению. Да! Русский журнал для дизайнеров-графиков, № 5, 1996
- «Мастерская конструктивизма — геометрия, структура, орнамент, цвет». Каталог выставки. ГТГ. Москва, 1998
- А.Морозов. Проект «К беспредметности». Каталог Московского международного художественного салона «ЦДХ-2000». Москва, 2000
- Игорь Березовский. Контакты с беспредметностью. Каталог выставки. Москва, 2000
- VI Международная биеннале графики стран Балтийского моря. Каталог выставки. Калининград, 2000
- Абстракция в России. ХХ век. Каталог выставки. ГРМ. Palace Edition, 2001
- Графика ХХ века. Новые поступления. Каталог выставки. ГТГ. Москва, 2003
- Игорь Березовский: контакты с беспредметностью. Каталог выставки. ГТГ. Москва, 2005
- Другой Березовский. Каталог выставки. Москва, 2007
