= Beryozovsky, Kemerovo Oblast =

Town in Kemerovo Oblast, Russia

Beryozovsky Берёзовский
- Town
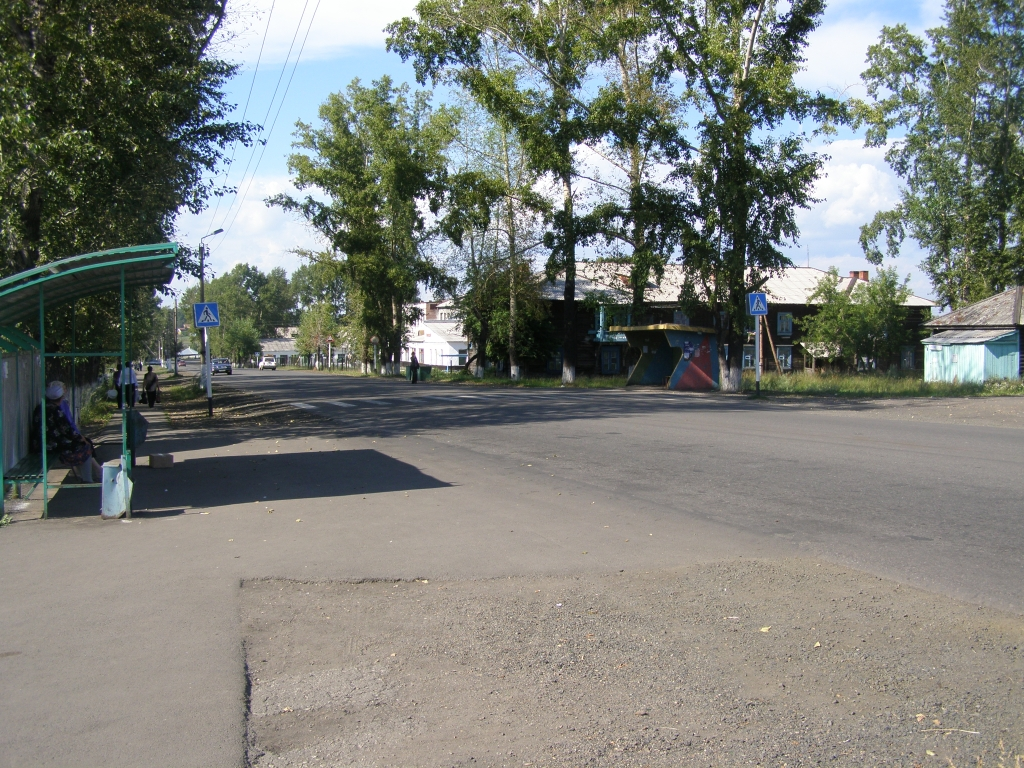
- In Beryozovsky

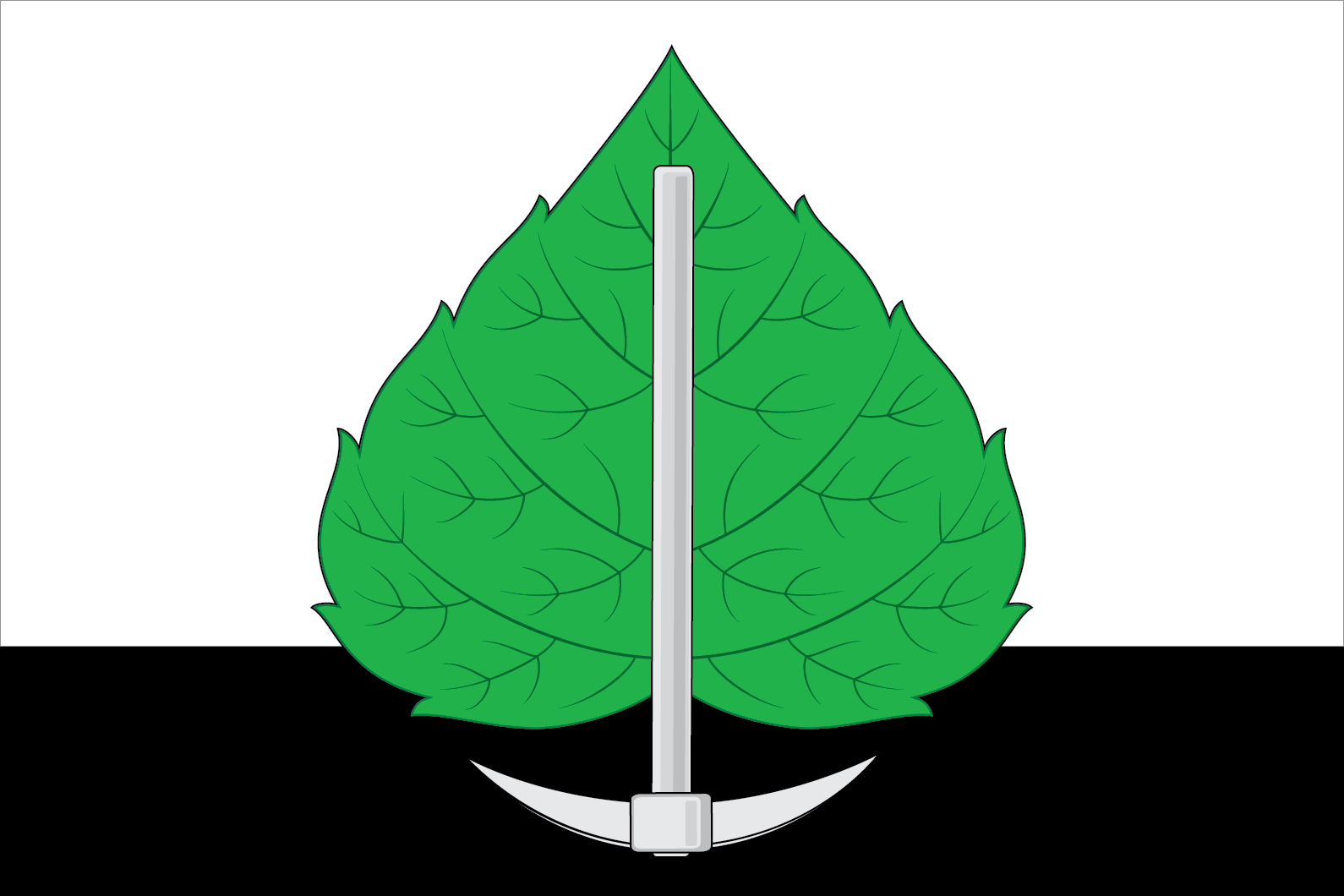
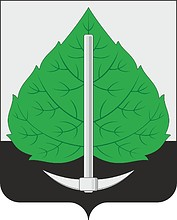
- Flag Coat of arms
- Interactive map of Beryozovsky
- Location of Beryozovsky Beryozovsky (Kemerovo Oblast)
- Coordinates: 55°37′N 86°15′E
- Country: Russia
- Federal subject: Kemerovo Oblast
- Founded: 1949
- Town status since: 1965
- Elevation: 230 m (750 ft)

Population (2010 Census)
  - Total: 47,279
  - Estimate (2025): 43,254 (−8.5%)

Administrative status
  - Subordinated to: Beryozovsky Town Under Oblast Jurisdiction
  - Capital of: Beryozovsky Town Under Oblast Jurisdiction

Municipal status
  - Urban okrug: Beryozovsky Urban Okrug
  - Capital of: Beryozovsky Urban Okrug
- Time zone: UTC+7 (MSK+4)
- Postal codes: 652420–652423, 652425, 652427
- OKTMO ID: 32710000001
- Website: www.berez.org

Beryozovsky (Russian: Берёзовский) is a town in Kemerovo Oblast, Russia, located between the Barzas and Shurap Rivers (Ob's basin), 27 kilometers (17 mi) north of Kemerovo, the administrative center of the oblast. Population: 47,279 (2010 census); 48,299 (2002 census); 51,250 (1989 Soviet census).

== History ==
The settlement of Beryozovsky serving a mine construction was established in 1949 and named after the Beryozovskaya mine it was planned to serve. On January 11, 1965, the settlement was merged with nearby settlements of Kurganovka (Кургановка) and Oktyabrsky (Октя́брьский) to form the town of Beryozovsky.

== Administrative and municipal status ==
Within the framework of administrative divisions, it is, together with two rural localities, incorporated as Beryozovsky Town Under Oblast Jurisdiction—an administrative unit with the status equal to that of the districts. As a municipal division, Beryozovsky Town Under Oblast Jurisdiction is incorporated as Beryozovsky Urban Okrug.

== Economy ==
Coal mining and enrichment are the main activities.
