= Nickel bis(diethyldithiocarbamate) =

Identifiers
CAS Number	14267-17-5
3D model (JSmol)	Interactive image
ChemSpider	76052
ECHA InfoCard	100.034.673
EC Number	238-157-4
PubChem CID	84307
CompTox Dashboard (EPA)	DTXSID70931579
- InChI: InChI=1S/2C5H11NS2.Ni/c2*1-3-6(4-2)5(7)8;/h2*3-4H2,1-2H3,(H,7,8);/q;;+2/p-2 Key: NCLUCMXMAPDFGT-UHFFFAOYSA-L
- SMILES: CCN(CC)C(=[S+1]1)S[Ni-2]12SC(=[S+]2)N(CC)CC

Properties
Chemical formula	C_{10}H_{20}N_{2}NiS_{4}
Molar mass	355.22 g·mol^{−1}
Appearance	light green solid
Density	1.41 g/cm^{3}
Solubility in water	insoluble

Hazards
- GHS labelling
Pictograms	(GHS08: Health hazard)
Signal word	Danger
Hazard statements	H317, H334, H350
Precautionary statements	P203, P233, P260, P271, P272, P280, P284, P302+P352, P304+P340, P318, P321, P333+P317, P342+P316, P362+P364, P403, P405, P501
- Except where otherwise noted, data are given for materials in their standard state (at 25 °C [77 °F], 100 kPa). Infobox references

Nickel bis(diethyldithiocarbamate) is the coordination complex ok nickel(II) and diethyldithiocarbamate, with the formula Ni(S_{2}CNEt_{2})_{2} (Et = ethyl). It is one a large number of square planar bis(dialkhyldithiocarbamate)s of nickel(II). The closely related nickel bis(dimethyldithiocarbamate) has been marketed as a fungicide. R related complexes are used as stabilizers in polymers.

== Preparation, structure, reactions ==
The compound precipitates as a greenish solid upon combining aqueous solutions of nickel(II) salts and sodium diethyldithiocarbamate. In terms of structure and bonding, the nickel is square planar, and the complex is diamagnetic. The planar structure has been confirmed by X-ray crystallography.

Oxidation of nickel bis(diethyldithiocarbamate) gives the red-brown nickel(IV) complex [Ni(S_{2}CNEt_{2})_{3}]^{+}.

== See also ==
- transition metal dithiocarbamate complexes
  - Nickel bis(dimethyldithiocarbamate)
  - Iron tris(dimethyldithiocarbamate)
