= Transition metal dithiocarbamate complexes =

Structure of iron tris(diethyldithiocarbamate).

Transition metal dithiocarbamate complexes are coordination complexes containing one or more dithiocarbamate ligand, which are typically abbreviated R_{2}dtc^{−}. Many complexes are known. Several homoleptic derivatives have the formula M(R_{2}dtc)_{n} where n = 2, 3 and 4.

== Ligand characteristics ==
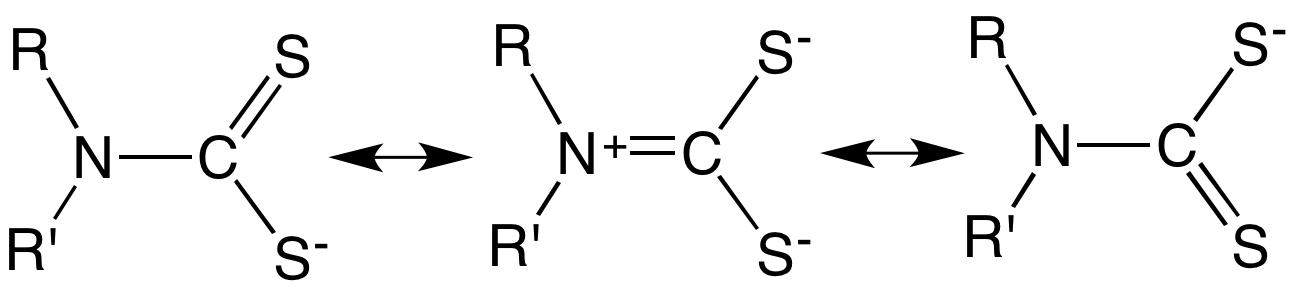
Main resonance structures of a dithiocarbamate anion.

Dithiocarbamate anions, when bidentate, are classified as L–X ligands in the Covalent bond classification method. In the usual electron counting method, they are three-electron ligands. With respect to HSAB theory, they are classified as soft.

Being intermediate in terms of ligand field strength, they form ferric complexes exhibit spin-crossover behavior.

Because of the pi-donor properties of the amino substituents, the two sulfur centers show enhanced basicity relative to dithiocarboxylates. This situation is represented by the zwitterionic resonance structure that depicts a positive charge on N and negative charges on both sulfurs. This N-to-C pi-bonding results in partial double bond character for the C–N bond. Consequently, barriers to rotational about this bond are elevated. Another consequence of their high basicity, dithiocarbamates often stabilize complexes in some high oxidation states (e.g., Fe(IV), Co(IV), Ni(III), Cu(III)).

Dithiocarbamate salts are easily synthesized by treating secondary amines with carbon disulfide in the presence of sodium hydroxide:

R_{2}NH + CS_{2} + NaOH → R_{2}NCS^{−}_{2}Na^{+} + H_{2}O

A wide variety of secondary amines give the corresponding dtc ligands. Popular amines include dimethylamine (Me_{2}NH), diethylamine (Et_{2}NH), and pyrrolidine ((CH_{2})_{4}NH). Complexes of H_{2}NCS^{−}_{2}, derived from the parent dithiocarbamic acid have been reported.

=== Related ligands ===
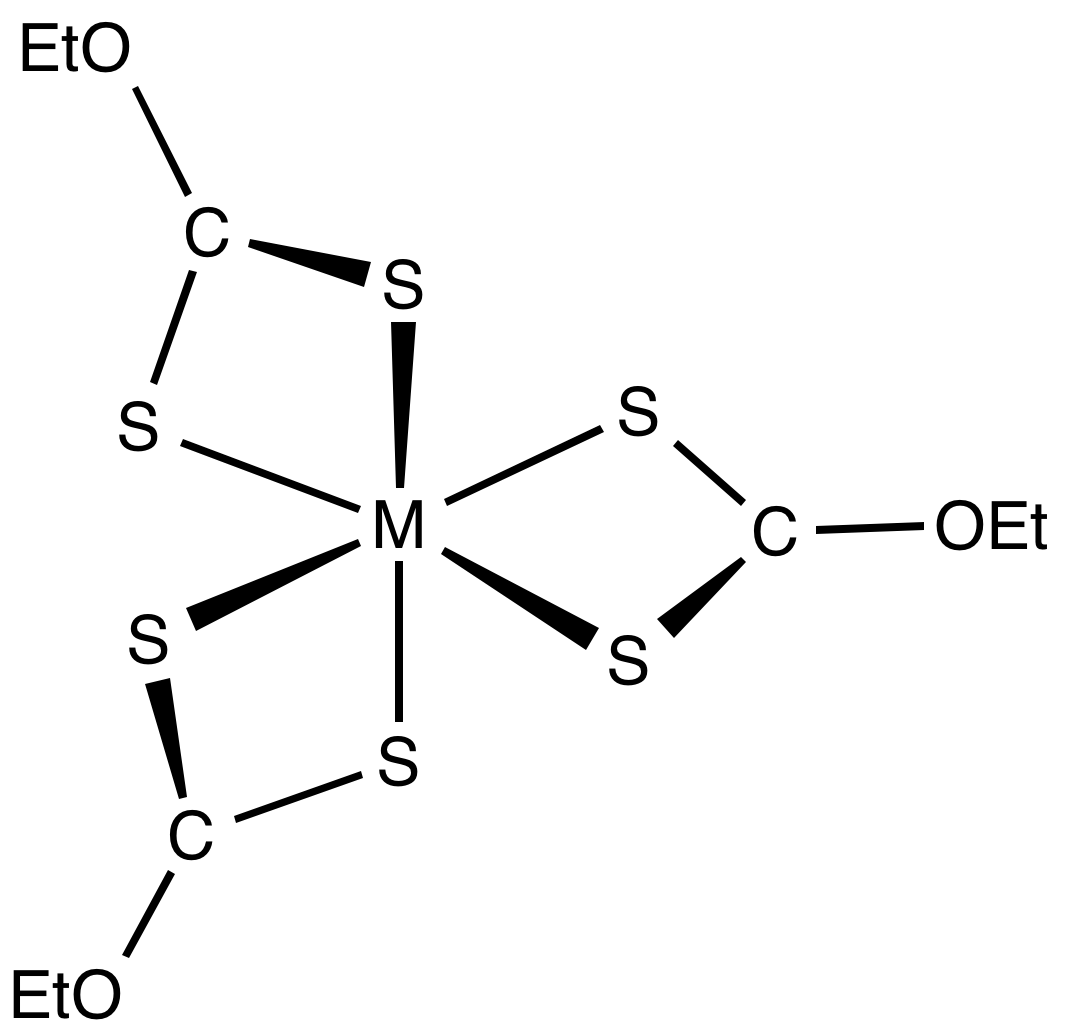
Structure of typical metal tris(ethylxanthate) complex.

Dithiocarbamates are classified as derivatives of dithiocarbamic acid. Their properties as ligands resemble the conjugate bases of many related "1,1-dithioacids":

- Diorganothiophosphates, (RO)_{2}PS^{−}_{2}
- Dithiocarboxylates, RCS^{−}_{2}
- Xanthates, ROCS^{−}_{2}
- Thioxanthates, RSCS^{−}_{2}
- Diselenocarbamates, R_{2}NCSe^{−}_{2}, such as diethyldiselenocarbamate

== Synthetic methods ==
Commonly, metal dithiocarbamates are prepared by salt metathesis reactions using alkali metal dithiocarbamates:

NiCl_{2} + 2 NaS_{2}CNMe_{2} → Ni(S_{2}CNMe_{2})_{2} + 2 NaCl

In some cases, the dithiocarbamate serves as a reductant, followed by its complexation.

A complementary method entails oxidative addition of thiuram disulfides to low-valent metal complexes:

Mo(CO)_{6} + 2 [S_{2}CNMe_{2}]_{2} → Mo(S_{2}CNMe_{2})_{4} + 6 CO

Metal amido complexes, such as tetrakis(dimethylamido)titanium, react with carbon disulfide:

Ti(NMe_{2})_{4} + 4 CS_{2} → Ti(S_{2}CNMe_{2})_{4}

== Homoleptic complexes ==
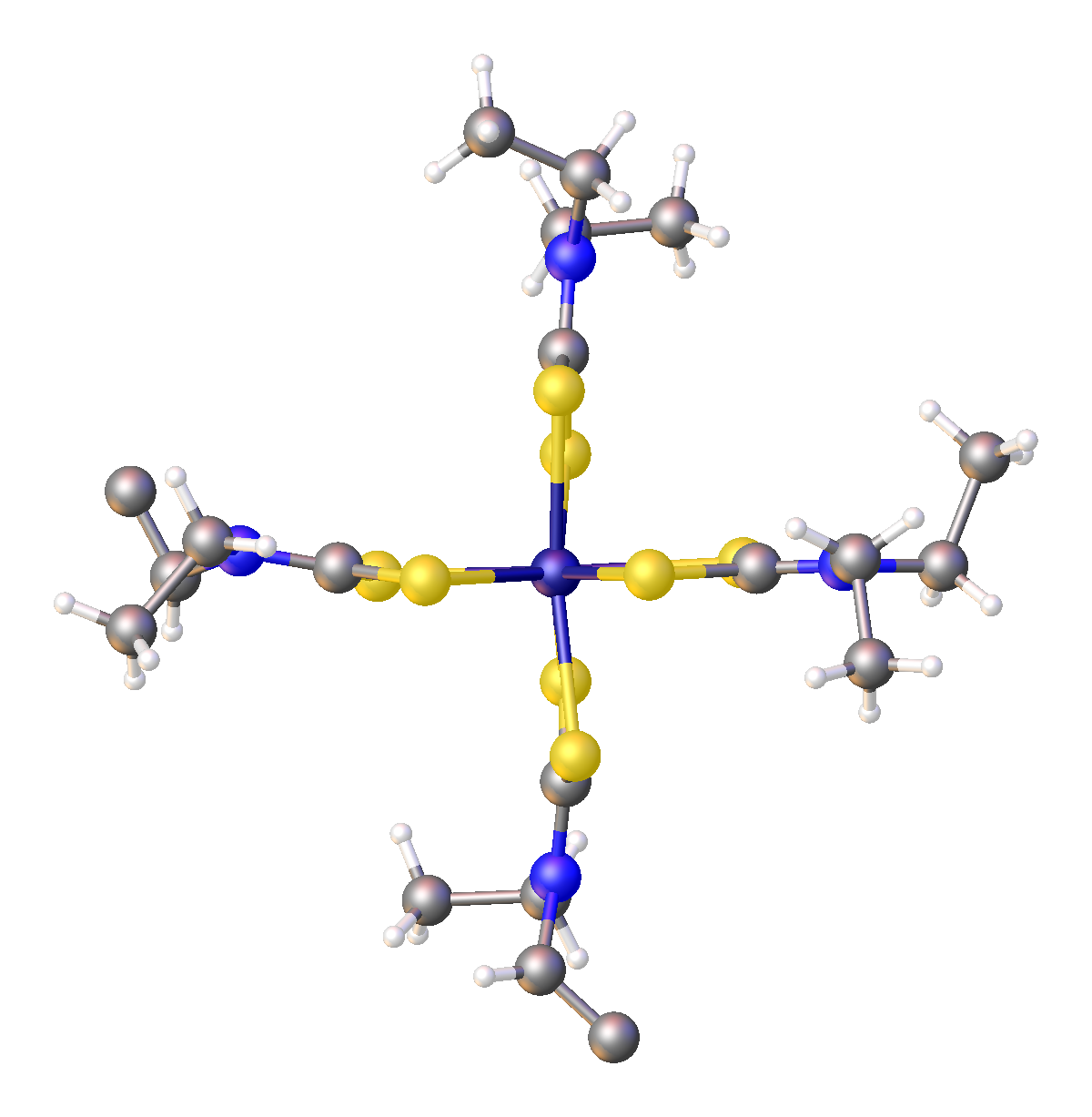
Structure of Ti(S_{2}CNEt_{2})_{4}.

Bis complexes

- nickel bis(dimethyldithiocarbamate), palladium bis(dimethyldithiocarbamate), platinum bis(dimethyldithiocarbamate), all square-planar complexes
- copper bis(diethyldithiocarbamate), a square-planar complex

Tris complexes

- vanadium tris(diethyldithiocarbamate), an octahedral complex
- chromium tris(diethyldithiocarbamate), an octahedral complex
- manganese tris(dimethyldithtiocarbamate), an octahedral complex
- iron tris(diethyldithiocarbamate), ruthenium tris(diethyldithiocarbamate), osmium tris(diethyldithiocarbamate), all octahedral complexes
- cobalt tris(diethyldithiocarbamate), rhodium tris(diethyldithiocarbamate), iridium tris(diethyldithiocarbamate), all octahedral complexes

Tetrakis complexes

- titanium tetrakis(dimethyldithiocarbamate)
- molybdenum tetrakis(diethyldithiocarbamate)

Dimetallic complexes

- iron bis(diethyldithiocarbamate), pentacoordinate Fe dimer
- zinc bis(dimethyldithiocarbamate), pentacoordinate Zn dimer
- dicobalt pentakis(diethyldithiocarbamate) cation, with a pair of octahedral Co(III) centers
- diruthenium pentakis(diethyldithiocarbamate) cation, with a pair of octahedral Ru(III) centers, two isomers

Isomers of [Ru_{2}(dtc)_{5}]^{+}.

== Reactions ==
Dithiocarbamate ligand can be removed from complexes by oxidation, as illustrated by the iodination of the iron tris(diethyldithiocarbamate):

2 Fe(S_{2}CNEt_{2})_{3} + I_{2} → 2 Fe(S_{2}CNEt_{2})_{2}I + (S_{2}CNEt_{2})_{2}

They degrade to metal sulfides upon heating.

== Applications ==
Dtc complexes find several applications:

- herbicides in the form of the iron and zinc derivatives Ferbam and Zineb, respectively
- vulcanization accelerators, zinc bis(dimethyldithiocarbamate).
- biochemistry, iron tris(dimethyldithiocarbamate) for detection of nitric oxide.
- lubricants. Metal thiocarbamates are also used in metal-to-metal lubrication proposes, mainly as an anti-oxidation or anti-extreme pressure (EP) additive. 1%–2% of such compounds can be added to internal combustion engine lubricant to increase extreme pressure performance in high operational temperatures.

== History ==
Délepine appears to have first prepared transition metal dithiocarbamate complexes in the form of copper(II) derivatives. A century earlier, complexes of xanthates has been reported by William Christopher Zeise. The phenomenon of spin crossover was reported in 1931 by Cambi et al. who observed anomalous magnetic behavior for the tris(N,N-dialkyldithiocarbamatoiron(III) complexes. The spin states of these complexes were sensitive to the nature of the amine substituents.
