= Sodium dimethyldithiocarbamate =

Identifiers
CAS Number	128-04-1 anhydrous
3D model (JSmol)	Interactive image
ChEBI	CHEBI:230449
ChEMBL	ChEMBL569460
ChemSpider	29128
ECHA InfoCard	100.004.434
PubChem CID	560256
UNII	769GO8W6QQ
CompTox Dashboard (EPA)	DTXSID6027050
- InChI: InChI=1S/C3H7NS2.Na/c1-4(2)3(5)6;/h1-2H3,(H,5,6);/q;+1/p-1 Key: VMSRVIHUFHQIAL-UHFFFAOYSA-M
- SMILES: CN(C)C(=S)[S-].[Na+]

Properties
Chemical formula	C_{3}H_{6}NNaS_{2}
Molar mass	143.20 g·mol^{−1}
Appearance	white solid
Density	1.18 g/cm^{3}
Melting point	106–108 °C (223–226 °F; 379–381 K)
- Except where otherwise noted, data are given for materials in their standard state (at 25 °C [77 °F], 100 kPa). Infobox references

Sodium dimethyldithiocarbamate is the organosulfur compound with the formula NaS_{2}CN(CH_{3})_{2}. It is one of the simplest organic dithiocarbamates. It is a white or pale yellow, water-soluble solid. The compound is a precursor to fungicides and rubber chemicals.

== Preparation ==
Sodium dimethyldithiocarbamate typically crystallizes from water as the dihydrate NaS_{2}CN(CH_{3})_{2}^{.}2H_{2}O. The anhydrous salt and the trihydrate are often used interchangeably.

Sodium dimethyldithiocarbamate is obtained by treating carbon disulfide with dimethylamine in the presence of sodium hydroxide:

CS_{2} + HN(CH_{3})_{2} + NaOH → NaS_{2}CN(CH_{3})_{2} + H_{2}O

Other dithiocarbamates can be prepared similarly from secondary amines and carbon disulfide. They are used as chelating agents for transition metal ions and as precursors to herbicides and vulcanization reagents.

The fungicide thiram, a thiuram disulfide, is the oxidized dimer of dimethyldithiocarbamate.

2 (CH_{3})_{2}NCS_{2}Na + H_{2}O_{2} → (CH_{3})_{2}NCS_{2}−SC(S)N(CH_{3})_{2} + 2 NaOH

== Uses ==
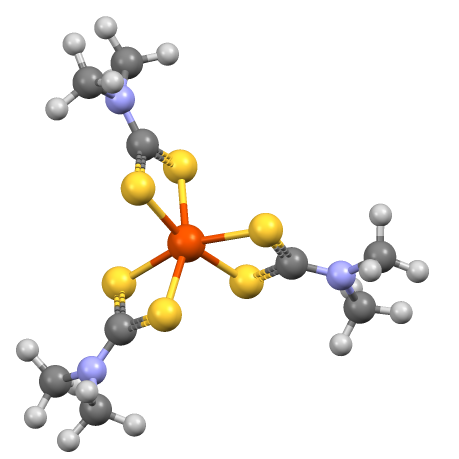
Iron tris(dimethyldithiocarbamate) (Fe(S_{2}CNMe_{2})_{3}) is illustrative of hundreds of known dithiocarbamate complexes.

It is a component of various pesticides and rubber chemicals in the form of its salts. Well established derivatives include potassium dimethyldithiocarbamate) as well as its complexes zinc dimethyldithiocarbamate, ferric dimethyldithiocarbamate, and nickel bis(dimethyldithiocarbamate). Oxidation gives thiram.
