= Cobalt tris(diethyldithiocarbamate) =

Names
- IUPAC name Tris(diethyldithiocarbamato)cobalt
- Other names Cobalt diethyl dithiocarbamate; cobalt(3+);N,N-diethylcarbamodithioate

Identifiers
CAS Number	13963-60-5
3D model (JSmol)	Interactive image
ChemSpider	67160271
PubChem CID	13981569
- InChI: InChI=1S/3C5H11NS2.Co/c3*1-3-6(4-2)5(7)8;/h3*3-4H2,1-2H3,(H,7,8);/q;;;+3/p-3 Key: JBNCRGZHNOJKHG-UHFFFAOYSA-K
- SMILES: CCN(CC)C(=S)[S-].CCN(CC)C(=S)[S-].CCN(CC)C(=S)[S-].[Co+3]

Properties
Chemical formula	[(C_{2}H_{5})_{2}NCS_{2}]_{3}Co
Molar mass	416.5 g/mol
Appearance	green solid
Density	1.43 g/cm^{3}

Related compounds
Other cations	Iron tris(diethyldithiocarbamate)
- Except where otherwise noted, data are given for materials in their standard state (at 25 °C [77 °F], 100 kPa). Infobox references

Cobalt tris(diethyldithiocarbamate) is the coordination complex of cobalt with diethyldithiocarbamate with the formula Co(S_{2}CNEt_{2})_{3} (Et = ethyl). It is a diamagnetic green solid that is soluble in organic solvents.

== Synthesis, structure, bonding ==
Cobalt tris(dithiocarbamate)s are typically are prepared by air-oxidation of mixtures of dithiocarbamate salts and a cobalt(II) nitrate. Cobalt tris(diethyldithiocarbamate) is an octahedral coordination complex of low-spin Co(III) with idealized D_{3} symmetry. The Co-S distances are 267 pm.

== Reactions ==
Oxidation of Co(Et_{2}dtc)_{3} occurs at mild potentials to give the cobalt(IV) derivative.

Treatment of Co(Et_{2}dtc)_{3} with fluoroboric acid results in the removal of 0.5 equiv of ligand giving a binuclear cation:

2 Co(Et_{2}dtc)_{3} + HBF_{4} → [Co_{2}(Et_{2}dtc)_{5}]BF_{4} + "Et_{2}NdtcH"
