= Maneb =

Names
- IUPAC name [[2-[(Dithiocarboxy)amino]ethyl]carbamodithioato]](2-)-kS,kS']manganese
- Other names Manganese ethylene-1,2-bisdithiocarbamate, polymer

Identifiers
CAS Number	12427-38-2
3D model (JSmol)	Interactive image
ChemSpider	2297517
ECHA InfoCard	100.032.400
MeSH	Maneb
PubChem CID	3032581
UNII	K221E12G7T
CompTox Dashboard (EPA)	DTXSID9020794
- InChI: InChI=1S/C4H8N2S4.Mn/c7-3(8)5-1-2-6-4(9)10;/h1-2H2,(H2,5,7,8)(H2,6,9,10);/q;+2/p-2 Key: YKSNLCVSTHTHJA-UHFFFAOYSA-L
- SMILES: [Mn+]SC(=S)NCCNC(=S)S[Mn]SC(=S)NCCNC(=S)S[Mn]SC(=S)NCCNC(=S)S[Mn]SC(=S)NCCNC(=S)S[Mn]SC(=S)NCCNC(=S)[S-]

Properties
Chemical formula	(C_{4}H_{6}MnN_{2}S_{4})_{n}
Appearance	Yellow to brown colored crystalline solid
Density	1.92 g/cm^{3}
Melting point	192 to 204 °C (378 to 399 °F; 465 to 477 K) (decomposes)
Solubility in water	160 mg/L

Hazards
- GHS labelling
Pictograms	(GHS07: Exclamation mark) (GHS08: Health hazard) (GHS09: Environmental hazard)
- Except where otherwise noted, data are given for materials in their standard state (at 25 °C [77 °F], 100 kPa). verify (what is ?) Infobox references

Maneb (manganese ethylene-bis-dithiocarbamate) is a fungicide and a polymeric complex of manganese with the ethylene bis (dithiocarbamate) anionic ligand.

== Health effects ==
Exposure to maneb can occur when breathed in; it can irritate the eyes, nose, and throat as well as cause headaches, fatigue, nervousness, dizziness, seizures and unconsciousness. Prolonged or long-term exposure may interfere with the function of the thyroid. Exposure to maneb is also shown to induce a Parkinson's disease-like neurotoxicity in mice. The link between maneb and Parkinson's disease had been suspected since the early 2000s; but however, a 2022 review concluded that maneb, alongside other pesticides like MPTP, paraquat, and rotenone, play a prominent role in the development of the disease. More investigation is needed to investigate its underlying mechanism of action.

== Production ==
Manganese(II) ethylenebis(dithiocarbamate) of low ethylenethiourea (ETU) content is prepared by mixing disodium ethylenebis (dithiocarbamate) with formaldehyde in aqueous medium then mixing a water-soluble manganese(II) salt to precipitate the maneb. The product can be further formulated with a metal salt and also with paraformaldehyde. (See External links for the patent citation)

== Applications ==
Maneb, is a broad spectrum fungicide that is extensively applied against a wide range of fungal pathogens affecting ornamental plants, food and feed crops. It can also be used to create a toxin-based animal model of Parkinson's disease, usually in primates.

== Environmental effects ==
Maneb will decompose into Ethylene thiourea, Mn^{2+}, CS_{2}, CO_{2}, and NH_{3} upon exposure with air or moisture. Maneb's decomposition products are largely influenced by environmental factors.

== Regulation ==
Maneb was included in a pesticide ban proposed by the Swedish Chemicals Agency and approved by the European Parliament on January 13, 2009.

== See also ==
- Metam sodium - A related dithiocarbamate salt which is also used as a fungicide.
- Zineb - ethylene bis(dithiocarbamate) with zinc instead of manganese.
- Mancozeb - A common fungicide containing Zineb and Maneb.
