= Iron bis(diethyldithiocarbamate) =

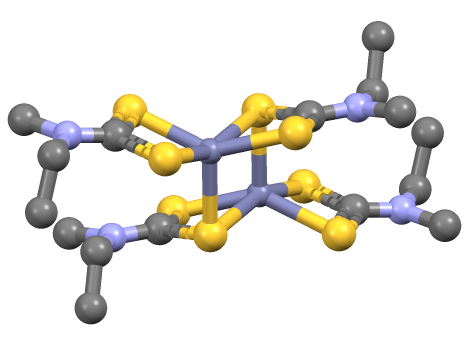

Identifiers
CAS Number	41367-63-9; monomer: 15656-03-8
3D model (JSmol)	Interactive image
ChemSpider	monomer: 76706
PubChem CID	monomer: 12087105
- InChI: InChI=1S/2C5H11NS2.Fe/c2*1-3-6(4-2)5(7)8;/h2*3-4H2,1-2H3,(H,7,8);/q;;+2/p-2 Key: WTAJDDHWXARSLK-UHFFFAOYSA-L
- SMILES: CCN(CC)C(=S)[S-].CCN(CC)C(=S)[S-].[Fe+2]

Properties
Chemical formula	C_{20}H_{40}Fe_{2}N_{4}S_{8}
Molar mass	704.74 g·mol^{−1}
Appearance	red solid
Density	1.457 g/cm^{3}
- Except where otherwise noted, data are given for materials in their standard state (at 25 °C [77 °F], 100 kPa). Infobox references

Iron bis(diethyldithiocarbamate) is a coordination complex with the formula [Fe(S_{2}CNEt_{2})_{2}]_{2} where Et = ethyl (C_{2}H_{5}). A red solid, iron bis(diethyldithiocarbamate) is representative of several ferrous dithiocarbamates with diverse substituents in place of ethyl. In terms of structure, the species is dimeric, consisting of a pair of pentacoordinate iron(II) centers. It is structurally related to zinc bis(dimethyldithiocarbamate).

== Reactions ==
The complex reacts with a variety of reagents with concomitant formation of mono-iron derivatives. It adds 9,10-phenanthroline (phen) to give the blue-octahedral complex Fe(S_{2}CNEt_{2})_{2}(phen). 3,4-Bis(trifluoromethyl)-1,2-dithiete reacts to give the Fe(IV) dithiolene complex Fe(S_{2}CNEt_{2})_{2}(S_{2}C_{2}(CF_{3})_{2}). Nitric oxide and carbon monoxide add to give the nitrosyl complex Fe(S_{2}CNEt_{2})_{2}NO and the carbonyl complex Fe(S_{2}CNEt_{2})_{2}(CO)_{2}, respectively.

== Related compounds ==
- Iron tris(diethyldithiocarbamate)
