= Sodium diethyldiselenocarbamate =

Identifiers
CAS Number	32704-58-0
3D model (JSmol)	Interactive image
PubChem CID	161893160
- InChI: InChI=1S/C5H11NSe2.Na/c1-3-6(4-2)5(7)8;/h3-4H2,1-2H3,(H,7,8);/q;+1/p-1 Key: YEJYYDYDMNZUJV-UHFFFAOYSA-M
- SMILES: [Na+].[Se-]C(=[Se])N(CC)CC

Properties
Chemical formula	C_{5}H_{10}NNaSe_{2}
Molar mass	265.074 g·mol^{−1}
Appearance	yellow solid
Melting point	100–101 °C (212–214 °F; 373–374 K)
- Except where otherwise noted, data are given for materials in their standard state (at 25 °C [77 °F], 100 kPa). Infobox references

Sodium diethyldiselenocarbamate is the organoselenium compound with the formula (CH_{3}CH_{2})_{2}NCSe^{−}_{2}Na^{+}. It is a deep yellow, water soluble salt. It is one of the best studied diselenocarbamates, otherwise a rare class of compounds.

== Preparation and reactions ==
Sodium diethyldiselenocarbamate is obtained by treating carbon diselenide with diethylamine in the presence of sodium hydroxide:

CSe_{2} + HN(C_{2}H_{5})_{2} + NaOH → NaSe_{2}CN(C_{2}H_{5})_{2} + H_{2}O

Other diselenocarbamates can be prepared similarly from secondary amines and carbon diselenide. The related diselenoxanthates have also been prepared.

Diethyldiselenocarbamate forms coordination complexes with many transition metals. With Se(II), it forms the bicyclic Se(Se_{2}CN(C_{2}H_{5})_{2})_{2}.

== Structure and bonding ==
The C_{2}NCSe_{2} core of the diethyldiselenocarbamate anion and its complexes is planar, indicating some C–N multiple bond character.

== See also ==
- Sodium diethyldithiocarbamate
- Transition metal dithiocarbamate complexes
