= Iron tris(diethyldithiocarbamate) =

Names
- IUPAC name Tris(diethyldithiocarbamato)iron
- Other names Ferric diethyl dithiocarbamate

Identifiers
CAS Number	13963-59-2
3D model (JSmol)	Interactive image
ChemSpider	21160212
EC Number	237-743-7
PubChem CID	84123
UNII	5Q2Y3B3BSF
CompTox Dashboard (EPA)	DTXSID90161134
- InChI: InChI=1S/3C5H11NS2.Fe/c3*1-3-6(4-2)5(7)8;/h3*3-4H2,1-2H3,(H,7,8);/q;;;+3/p-3 Key: WGPCJVLKOFIRMS-UHFFFAOYSA-K
- SMILES: CCN(CC)C(=S)[S-].CCN(CC)C(=S)[S-].CCN(CC)C(=S)[S-].[Fe+3]

Properties
Chemical formula	[(C_{2}H_{5})_{2}NCS_{2}]_{3}Fe
Molar mass	500.63 g/mol
Appearance	Dark brown to black solid
Density	1.404 g/cm^{3}
- Except where otherwise noted, data are given for materials in their standard state (at 25 °C [77 °F], 100 kPa). Infobox references

Iron tris(diethyldithiocarbamate) is the coordination complex of iron with diethyldithiocarbamate with the formula Fe(S_{2}CNEt_{2})_{3} (Et = ethyl). It is a black solid that is soluble in organic solvents.

== Synthesis, structure, bonding ==
Iron tris(dithiocarbamate)s are typically are prepared by salt metathesis reactions.

Iron tris(diethyldithiocarbamate) is an octahedral coordination complex of iron(III) with idealized D_{3} symmetry.

The phenomenon of spin crossover (SCO) was first reported in 1931 by Cambi et al. who observed anomalous magnetic behavior for the tris(N,N-dialkyldithiocarbamatoiron(III) complexes. The magnetism of these complexes are sensitive to the nature of the amine substituents as well as to temperature. This behavior is consistent with an equilibrium between two or more spin states. In the case of Fe(Et_{2}dtc)_{3}, X-ray crystallography reveals that the Fe-S bonds are 231 pm at 79K but 356 pm at 297 K. These data indicate a low-spin configuration at low temperatures and a high spin configuration near room temperature.

Iron tris(dithiocarbamate)s characteristically react with nitric oxide to give Fe(dtc)_{2}NO. This efficient chemical trapping reaction provides a means to detect NO.

Reflecting the strongly donating properties of dithiocarbamate ligands, iron tris(dithiocarbamate)s oxidize at relatively mild potentials to give isolable iron(IV) derivatives [Fe(S_{2}CNR_{2})_{3}]^{+}.

== Safety ==
Iron tris(dimethyldithiocarbamate) is the herbicide ferbam, which is poisonous.

== See also ==
- Iron tris(dimethyldithiocarbamate) - a related dimethyldithiocarbamate complex of iron
- Iron bis(diethyldithiocarbamate)
- Cobalt tris(diethyldithiocarbamate)
