= Carbon diselenide =

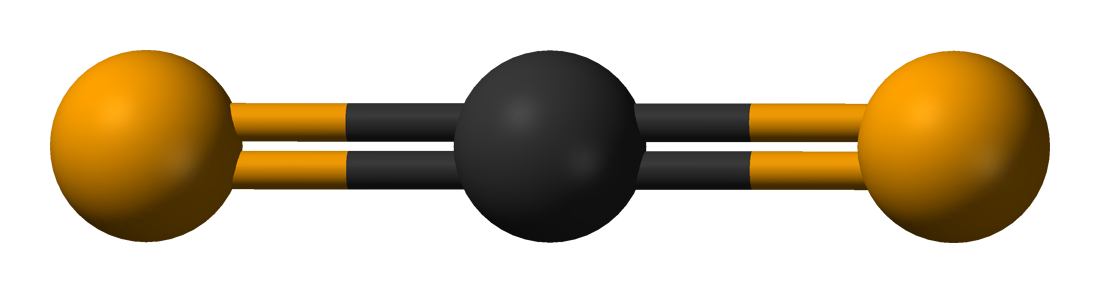

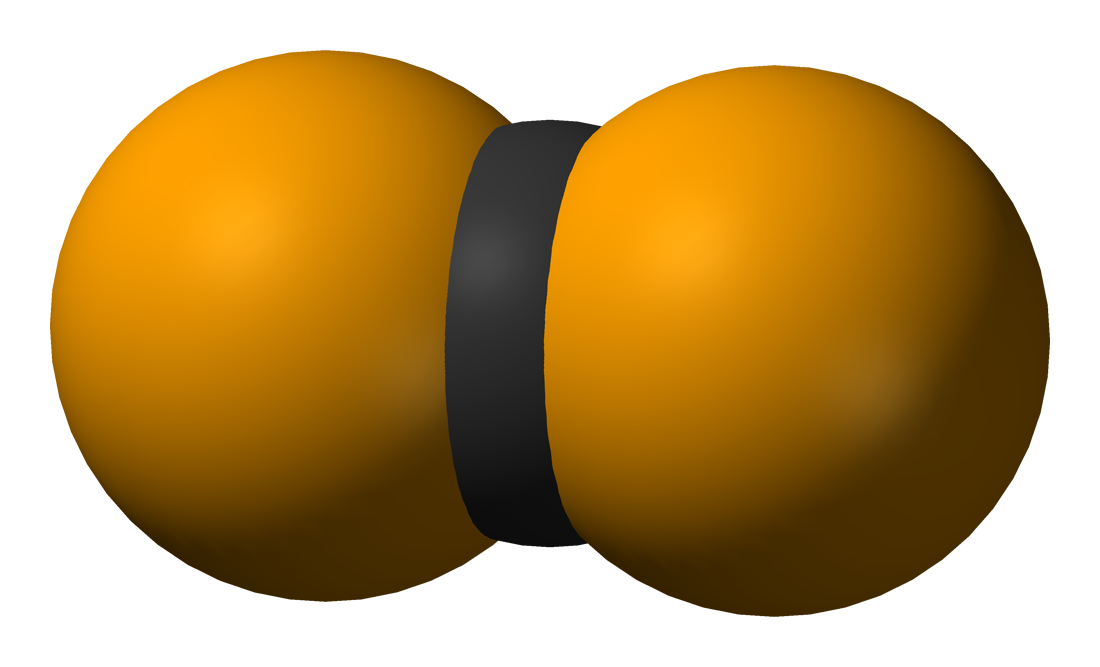

Names
- IUPAC name Carbon diselenide
- Systematic IUPAC name Methanediselenone
- Other names Carbon selenide Diselenoxomethane; Methanediselone; Carbon(IV) selenide

Identifiers
CAS Number	506-80-9
3D model (JSmol)	Interactive image
ChemSpider	61481
ECHA InfoCard	100.007.323
EC Number	208-054-9
PubChem CID	68174
UNII	WD123H448C
CompTox Dashboard (EPA)	DTXSID1060138
- InChI: InChI=1S/CSe2/c2-1-3 Key: JNZSJDBNBJWXMZ-UHFFFAOYSA-N; InChI=1/CSe2/c2-1-3 Key: JNZSJDBNBJWXMZ-UHFFFAOYAM
- SMILES: [Se]=C=[Se]

Properties
Chemical formula	CSe_{2}
Molar mass	169.953 g·mol^{−1}
Appearance	Yellow liquid
Density	2.6824 g/cm^{3}
Melting point	−43.7 °C (−46.7 °F; 229.5 K)
Boiling point	125.5 °C (257.9 °F; 398.6 K)
Solubility in water	0.054 g/(100 mL)
Solubility	Soluble in CS_{2}, toluene
Dipole moment	0 D

Thermochemistry
Heat capacity (C)	50.32 J/(mol·K) (gas)
Std molar entropy (S^{⦵}_{298})	263.2 J/(mol·K) (gas)
Std enthalpy of formation (Δ_{f}H^{⦵}_{298})	219.2 kJ/mol (liquid)

Hazards
Flash point	30 °C (86 °F; 303 K)
- Except where otherwise noted, data are given for materials in their standard state (at 25 °C [77 °F], 100 kPa). verify (what is ?) Infobox references

Carbon diselenide is an inorganic compound with the chemical formula CSe_{2}. It is a yellow-orange oily liquid with a pungent odor. It is the selenium analogue of carbon disulfide (CS_{2}) and carbon dioxide (CO_{2}). This light-sensitive compound is insoluble in water and soluble in organic solvents.

== Synthesis, structure and reactions ==
Carbon diselenide is a linear molecule with D_{∞h} symmetry. It is produced by reacting selenium powder with dichloromethane vapor near 550 °C.

2 Se + CH_{2}Cl_{2} → CSe_{2} + 2 HCl

It was first reported by Grimm and Metzger, who prepared it by treating hydrogen selenide with carbon tetrachloride in a hot tube.

Like carbon disulfide, carbon diselenide polymerizes under high pressure or base. The structure of the polymer is thought to be a head-to-head structure with a backbone in the form of [−C(=Se)−Se−]_{n}. The polymer is a semiconductor with a room-temperature conductivity of 50 S/cm.

In addition, carbon diselenide is a precursor to tetraselenafulvalenes, the selenium analogue of tetrathiafulvalene, which can be further used to synthesize organic conductors and organic superconductors.

Carbon diselenide reacts with primary amines to give selenoureas and secondary amines to give dialkydiselenocarbamates:

2 CH_{3}CH_{2})_{2}NH + CSe_{2} → [(CH_{3}CH_{2})_{2}NH^{+}_{2}]((CH_{3}CH_{2})_{2}N−CSe^{−}_{2})

== Safety ==
Carbon diselenide has high vapor pressure. It has a moderate toxicity and presents an inhalation hazard. It may be dangerous due to its easy membrane transport. It decomposes slowly in storage (about 1% per month at –30 °C). When obtained commercially, its cost is high.

Pure distilled carbon diselenide has an odor very similar to that of carbon disulfide, but mixed with air, it creates extremely offensive odors (corresponding to new, highly toxic reaction products). Its smell forced an evacuation of a nearby village when it was first synthesized in 1936. Because of the odor, synthetic pathways have been developed to avoid its use.
