= Metam sodium =

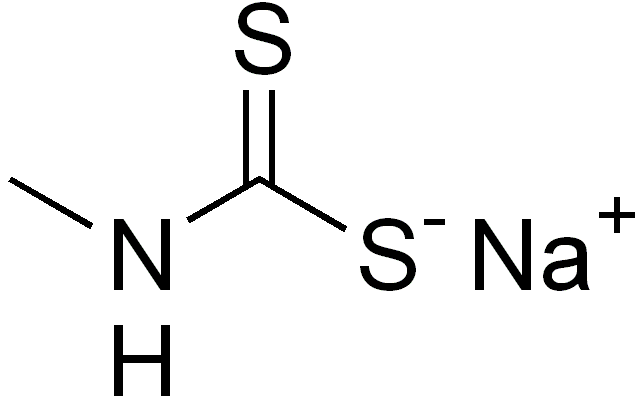

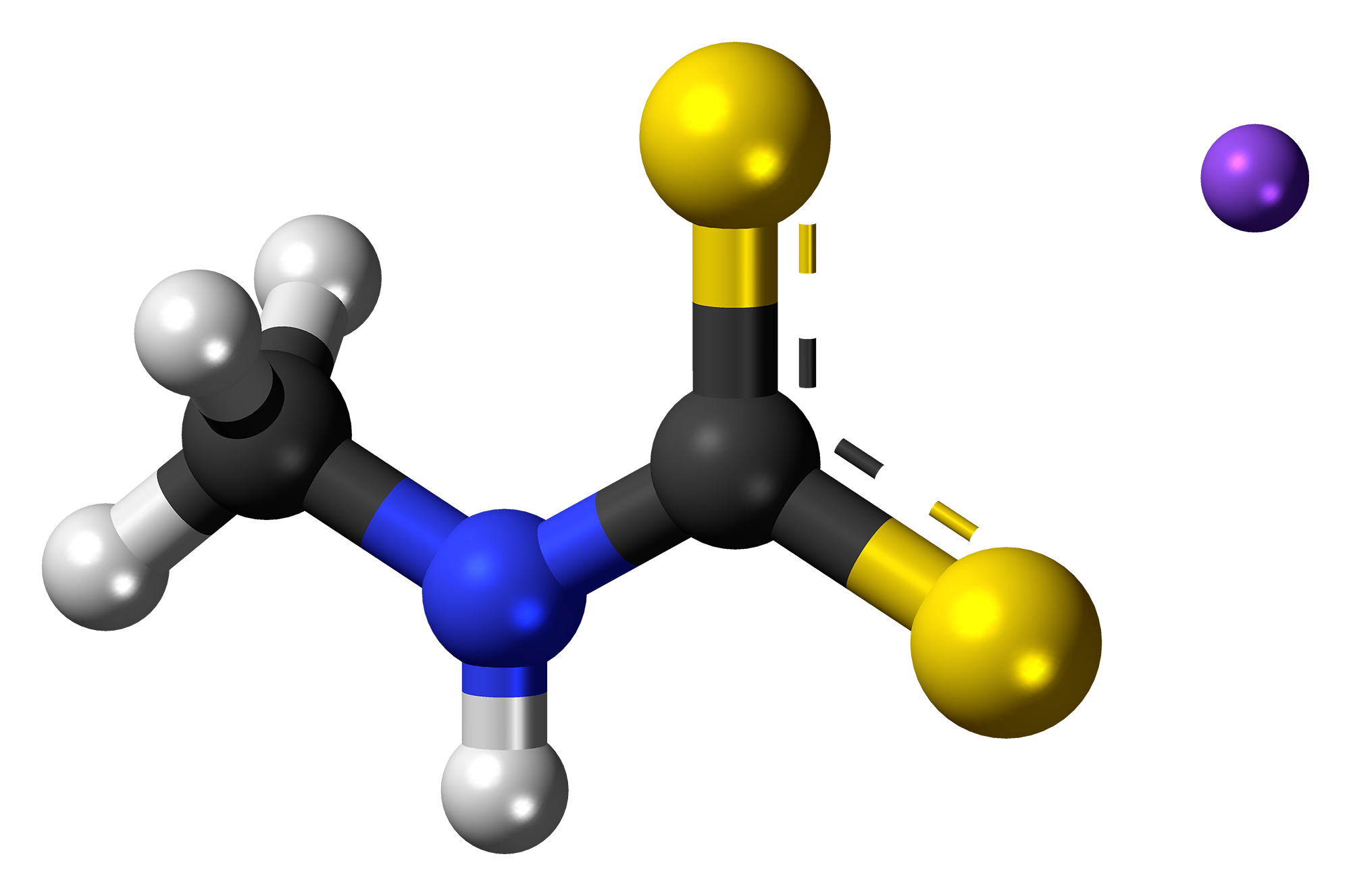

Names
- Preferred IUPAC name Sodium methylcarbamodithioate
- Other names Metham sodium Carbathion; Carbathione; Carbothion; Metamsodium; Metam-sodium

Identifiers
CAS Number	137-42-8
3D model (JSmol)	Interactive image
ChemSpider	2273119
ECHA InfoCard	100.004.812
PubChem CID	5366415
UNII	3CD7UKN224
CompTox Dashboard (EPA)	DTXSID2029167
- InChI: InChI=1S/C2H5NS2.Na/c1-3-2(4)5;/h1H3,(H2,3,4,5);/q;+1/p-1 Key: AFCCDDWKHLHPDF-UHFFFAOYSA-M
- SMILES: [Na+].[S-]C(=S)NC

Properties
Chemical formula	C_{2}H_{4}NNaS_{2}
Molar mass	129.18 g/mol
- Except where otherwise noted, data are given for materials in their standard state (at 25 °C [77 °F], 100 kPa). verify (what is ?) Infobox references

Metam sodium is an organosulfur compound with the formula CH_{3}NHCS_{2}Na. The compound is a sodium salt of a dithiocarbamate. The compound exists as a colorless dihydrate, but most commonly it is encountered as an aqueous solution. It is used as a soil fumigant, pesticide, herbicide, and fungicide. It is one of the most widely used pesticides in the United States, with approximately 60 million pounds used in 2001.

Metam-sodium belongs to two HRAC groups, so it is designated Group A/C (Aus), Group A/C1 (global) and Group 1/5 (numeric).

== Preparation and properties ==
Metam sodium is prepared by combining methylamine, carbon disulfide, and sodium hydroxide:

CH_{3}NH_{2} + CS_{2} + NaOH → CH_{3}NHCS_{2}Na + H_{2}O

It also arises from the reaction of methyl isothiocyanate and sodium thiolate.

Upon exposure to the environment, metam sodium decomposes to methyl isothiocyanate and other sulfur compounds.

== Safety and environmental considerations ==
Metam sodium is nonpersistent in the environment since it decomposes rather quickly to toxic methyl isothiocyanate and carbon disulfide. In 1991 a tank car with 19,000 gallons of a metam sodium based pesticide spilled into Sacramento River above Lake Shasta. This killed all fish in a 41-mile stretch of the river. 20 years later the rainbow trout population had recovered.

== See also ==
- Zineb - A related dithiocarbamate salt which is also used as a fungicide
