= Carbon disulfide (data page) =

Chemical data page

This page provides supplementary chemical data on carbon disulfide.

== Material Safety Data Sheet ==
The handling of this chemical may incur notable safety precautions. It is highly recommended that you seek the Material Safety Datasheet (MSDS) for this chemical from a reliable source such as SIRI, and follow its direction. MSDS available from Mallinckrodt Baker

== Structure and properties ==
Structure and properties
Index of refraction, n_{D}	1.6276 at 20 °C
Abbe number	?
Dielectric constant, ε_{r}	2.641 ε_{0} at 20 °C
Bond strength	?
Bond length	?
Bond angle	?
Magnetic susceptibility	?
Surface tension	35.3 dyn/cm at 0 °C; 32.3 dyn/cm at 20 °C
Viscosity	0.495 mPa·s at –10 °C; 0.436 mPa·s at 0 °C; 0.380 mPa·s at 5 °C; 0.363 mPa·s at 20 °C

== Thermodynamic properties ==
Phase behavior
Triple point	161.11 K (–112.04 °C), ? Pa
Critical point	552 K (279 °C), 7900.00 kPa
Std enthalpy change of fusion, Δ_{fus}H^{~~o~~}	4.39 kJ/mol
Std entropy change of fusion, Δ_{fus}S^{~~o~~}	? J/(mol·K)
Std enthalpy change of vaporization, Δ_{vap}H^{~~o~~}	27.65 kJ/mol
Std entropy change of vaporization, Δ_{vap}S^{~~o~~}	86.68 J/(mol·K)
Solid properties
Std enthalpy change of formation, Δ_{f}H^{~~o~~}_{solid}	? kJ/mol
Standard molar entropy, S^{~~o~~}_{solid}	? J/(mol K)
Heat capacity, c_{p}	? J/(mol K)
Liquid properties
Std enthalpy change of formation, Δ_{f}H^{~~o~~}_{liquid}	89.41 kJ/mol
Standard molar entropy, S^{~~o~~}_{liquid}	151.0 J/(mol K)
Enthalpy of combustion, Δ_{c}H^{~~o~~}_{liquid}	–1687.2 kJ/mol
Heat capacity, c_{p}	78.99 J/(mol K) at 25 °C
Gas properties
Std enthalpy change of formation, Δ_{f}H^{~~o~~}_{gas}	117.1 kJ/mol
Standard molar entropy, S^{~~o~~}_{gas}	237.98 J/(mol K) at 101.325 kPa
Enthalpy of combustion, Δ_{c}H^{~~o~~}_{gas}	–1112 kJ/mol
Heat capacity, c_{p}	45.66 J/(mol K)
van der Waals' constants	a = 1177 L^{2} kPa/mol^{2} b = 0.07685 liter per mole

== Vapor pressure of liquid ==
P in mm Hg	1	10	40	100	400	760	1520	3800	7600	15200	30400	45600
T in °C	–73.8	–44.7	–22.5	–5.1	28.0	46.5	69.1	104.8	136.3	175.5	222.8	256.0

Table data obtained from CRC Handbook of Chemistry and Physics 44th ed.

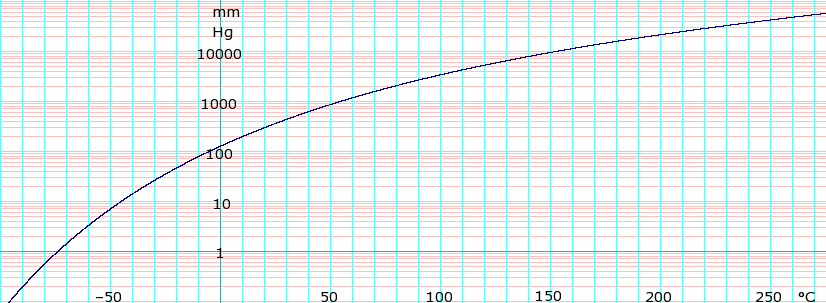
log_{10} of Carbon disulfide vapor pressure. Uses formula: $\scriptstyle \log_e P_{mmHg} =$$\scriptstyle \log_e (\frac {760} {101.325}) - 4.817221\log_e(T+273.15) - \frac {4563.180} {T+273.15} + 46.19124 + 4.829056 \times 10^{-06} (T+273.15)^2$ obtained from CHERIC

== Distillation data ==
Vapor-liquid Equilibrium for Carbon disulfide/Methanol; P = 760 mm Hg
BP Temp. °C	% by mole carbon disulfide
BP Temp. °C	liquid	vapor
58.8	1.3	20.6
53.0	2.5	34.9
47.8	4.5	48.7
43.5	9.9	65.3
42.8	10.6	65.9
40.0	15.1	67.6
38.9	19.4	70.1
38.5	20.0	69.1
38.0	34.0	69.8
37.8	64.9	70.1
37.6	70.0	70.1
37.9	75.7	70.5
37.8	90.3	72.3
37.7	91.6	73.4
37.8	92.8	72.7
38.2	93.0	72.9
41.0	99.0	84.4
44.1	99.7	99.5

== Spectral data ==
UV-Vis
λ_{max}	? nm
Extinction coefficient, ε	?
IR
Major absorption bands	? cm^{−1}
NMR
Proton NMR
Carbon-13 NMR
Other NMR data
MS
Masses of main fragments
