= Nickel bis(dimethyldithiocarbamate) =

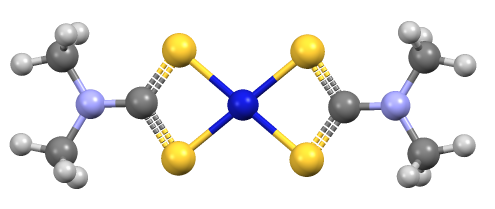

Names
- Other names Sankel, ethyl niclate; nickel dimethyldithiocarbamate

Identifiers
| CAS Number | 14484-64-1 |
| 3D model (JSmol) | Interactive image |
| ChemSpider | 76647 |
| EC Number | 239-560-8 |
| PubChem CID | 84966 |
| UNII | SKM8W5154H |
- InChI: InChI=1S/2C3H7NS2.Ni/c2*1-4(2)3(5)6;/h2*1-2H3,(H,5,6);/q;;+2/p-2 Key: BLCKKNLGFULNRC-UHFFFAOYSA-L
- SMILES: CN(C)C(=[S+1]1)S[Ni-2]12SC(=[S+]2)N(C)C

Properties
| Chemical formula | C_{6}H_{12}N_{2}NiS_{4} |
| Molar mass | 299.11 g·mol^{−1} |
| Appearance | light green solid |
| Solubility in water | insoluble |
- Except where otherwise noted, data are given for materials in their standard state (at 25 °C [77 °F], 100 kPa). Infobox references

Nickel bis(dimethyldithiocarbamate) is the coordination complex on nickel and dimethyldithiocarbamate, with the formula Ni(S_{2}CNMe_{2})_{2} (Me = methyl). It is the prototype for a large number of square planar bis(dialkhyldithiocarbamate)s of nickel(II), which feature diverse organic substituents. Nickel bis(dimethyldithiocarbamate) has been marketed as a fungicide, and related complexes are used as stabilizers in polymers.

== Preparation and structure ==
The compound precipitates as a light green solid upon combining aqueous solutions of nickel(II) salts and sodium dimethyldithiocarbamate. In terms of structure and bonding, the nickel is square planar, and the complex is diamagnetic. The structure of the closely related nickel bis(diethyldithiocarbamate) has been determined by X-ray crystallography.

Oxidation of nickel bis(dieethyldithiocarbamate) gives the red-brown nickel(IV) complex [Ni(S_{2}CNEt_{2})_{3}]^{+}.

== See also ==
- transition metal dithiocarbamate complexes
  - Nickel bis(diethyldithiocarbamate)
  - Zinc dimethyldithiocarbamate
  - Iron tris(dimethyldithiocarbamate)
