= Carbon disulfide hydrolase =

Enzyme

Identifiers
- EC no.: 3.13.1.5

Databases
- BRENDA: enzyme data
- ExPASy: NiceZyme view
- KEGG: enzyme entry
- MetaCyc: metabolic pathway
- Rhea: reactions
- PDB structures: RCSB PDB PDBe PDBsum
Search
- PMC: articles
- PubMed: articles
- NCBI: proteins

Identifiers
- Symbol: ?
- SCOP2: 1can / SCOPe / SUPFAM

Carbon disulfide hydrolase is an enzyme that catalyzes carbon disulfide hydrolysis. It is hexadecameric, weighing 23,576 Da (per molecule).

Carbon disulfide occurs naturally in the mudpots of volcanic solfataras. It is a precursor to hydrogen sulfide, which is an electron donor. A hyperthermophilic Acidianus strain was found to convert CS_{2} into H_{2}S and CO_{2}.

The enzyme is similar to that of carbonic anhydrases. The enzyme monomer of CS_{2} hydrolase displays a typical β-carbonic anhydrase fold and active site. Two of these monomers form a closely intertwined dimer with a central β-sheet capped by an α-helical domain. Four dimers form a square octameric ring through interactions of the long arms at the N and C termini. Similar ring structures have been seen in strains of carbonic anhydrases, however, in CS_{2} hydrolase is an enzyme consisting of two octameric rings form a hexadecamer by interlocking at right angles to each other. This results in the blocking of the entrance to the active site and the formation of a single 15-Å-long, highly hydrophobic tunnel that functions as a specificity filter. This provides a key difference between carbonic anhydrase and CS_{2} hydrolase. This tunnel determines the enzyme's substrate specificity for CS_{2}, which is hydrophobic as well.

== Mechanism ==
This hydrolase converts CS_{2} into H_{2}S. The process is similar to the hydration of CO_{2} by carbonic anhydrase. This similarity points to a likely mechanism. The zinc at the active site is tetrahedral, being coordinated by Cys 35, His 88, Cys 91 and water. The water is deprotonated to give a zinc hydroxide that adds the substrate to give a Zn-O-C(S)SH intermediate. A similar process is proposed to convert COS into CO_{2}.

CS_{2} + H_{2}O → COS + H_{2}S
COS + H_{2}O → CO_{2} + H_{2}S

The apoenzyme form, lacking the zinc cofactor, has a molecular weight of 382815.4 g/mol. The chloride ion and the 3,6,9,12,15,18,21,24,27,30,33,36,39-tridecaoxahentetracontane-1,41-diol (C28H58O15) are the two main ligands seen on the enzyme in this form. There are 16 polymer chains seen in this form contributing to the heaviness of the enzyme. This form is also sometimes termed the selenomethionine form.
