= LIESST =

In chemistry and physics, LIESST (Light-Induced Excited Spin-State Trapping) is a method of changing the electronic spin state of a compound by means of irradiation with light.

Electron distribution for the two different spin states for a d^{6} metal in an idealized O_{h} geometry

Many transition metal complexes with electronic configuration d^{4}-d^{7} are capable of spin crossover (and d^{8} when molecular symmetry is lower than O_{h}). Spin crossover refers to where a transition from the high spin (HS) state to the low spin (LS) state or vice versa occurs. Alternatives to LIESST include using thermal changes and pressure to induce spin crossover. The metal most commonly exhibiting spin crossover is iron, with the first known example, an iron(III) tris(dithiocarbamato) complex, reported by Cambi et al. in 1931.

For iron complexes, LIESST involves excitation of the low spin complex with green light to a triplet state. Two successive steps of intersystem crossing result in the high spin complex. Movement from the high spin complex to the low spin complex requires excitation with red light.
