= Silver diethyldithiocarbamate =

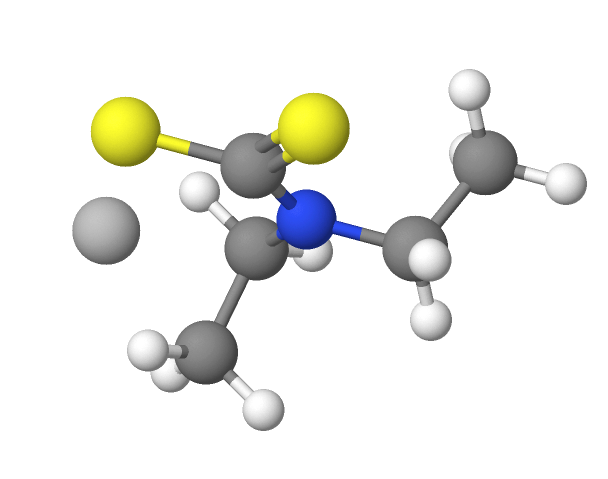

Names
- IUPAC name Silver diethylcarbamodithioate

Identifiers
CAS Number	1470-61-7
3D model (JSmol)	Interactive image
ChemSpider	21169492
ECHA InfoCard	100.014.549
EC Number	216-003-7
PubChem CID	3034078
UNII	GVN001B86O
CompTox Dashboard (EPA)	DTXSID20933003
- InChI: InChI=1S/C5H11NS2.Ag/c1-3-6(4-2)5(7)8;/h3-4H2,1-2H3,(H,7,8);/q;+1/p-1 Key: NSVHDIYWJVLAGH-UHFFFAOYSA-M
- SMILES: CCN(CC)C(=S)[S-].[Ag+]

Properties
Chemical formula	C_{5}H_{10}AgNS_{2}
Molar mass	256.13 g·mol^{−1}
Appearance	Greenish-yellow solid
Melting point	175 °C (347 °F; 448 K)
Solubility in water	Insoluble
Solubility	Soluble in pyridine

Hazards
- GHS labelling
Pictograms	(GHS07: Exclamation mark)
Signal word	Warning
Hazard statements	H315, H319, H335
Precautionary statements	P261, P264, P271, P280, P302+P352, P304+P340, P305+P351+P338, P312, P321, P332+P313, P337+P313, P362, P403+P233, P405, P501
NFPA 704 (fire diamond)	2 1 0
- Except where otherwise noted, data are given for materials in their standard state (at 25 °C [77 °F], 100 kPa). Infobox references

Silver diethyldithiocarbamate is a chemical compound, with formula AgS_{2}CN(CH_{2}CH_{3})_{2}. It is the silver salt of diethyldithiocarbamic acid; the latter is a well-known chelator of heavy metals. In most of its applications, silver diethyldithiocarbamate resembles the cheaper sodium diethyldithiocarbamate, but it is uniquely insoluble in water. That property makes it a useful analytical reagent for determining arsenic concentrations.

== Preparation ==
Silver diethyldithiocarbamate can be prepared by mixing a solution sodium diethyldithiocarbamate with a solution of silver nitrate. A precipitate forms immediately and can be filtered to isolate from the rest of the mixture. The solid should then be rinsed with hot water in order to remove the residual acid salt that will be present.

== Application ==
Silver diethyldithiocarbamate can be applied to introduce the diethyldithiocarbamate ligand to a coordination compound. Silver diethyldithiocarbamate can also be used to detect Nitrogen monooxide in the brain and other tissue. These applications are similar to the applications of sodium diethyldithiocarbamate, which is more practical to use from a synthetic and toxicological perspective.

=== Determination of arsenic concentration ===
Figure 1: arsenic tris(diethyldithiocarbamate)

Figure 2: diethyldithiocarbamate; another possible product

The solubility of silver diethyldithiocarbamate, compared to sodium diethyldithiocarbamate, allows it to be used to determine arsenic concentrations in water. Silver diethyldithiocarbamate dissolved in pyridine appears as an intensely yellow-colored solution. Arsenic ions are transferred to an arsine generating flask and diluted with water. Sulfuric acid, potassium iodide solution, and stannous chloride dihydrate are diluted in a solution of concentrated hydrochloric acid and mixed. The apparatus is plugged loosely with lead acetate wool, which acts as a scrubber. The pyridine and silver diethyldithiocarbamate solution is added to the tube and serves as the absorber solution. Granulated zinc is added to the arsine generator flask, which will result in the production of hydrogen because of the presence of acid. The arsine is carried through the tube by the generated hydrogen gas. The arsine reacts with the silver diethyldithiocarbamate solution and forms red-colored products (535 nm). Ultraviolet-visible spectroscopy can be used to determine the concentration of arsenic can be calculated based on Beer's Law.

The red product is a result of arsine bubbling through the silver diethyldithiocarbamate solution and there are two likely products responsible for the color change. One is arsenic substituting the silver in diethyldithiocarbamate, resulting a coordination compound in which three diethyldithiocarbamate ligands are bound to an arsenic atom (Figure 1). The other product is a result of the reduction of silver diethyldithiocarbamate (Figure 2).

This method for determination of arsenic concentration is applicable to not only waste water and mineral water but also petroleum, the human body, various foods and ores, and pyrolysis gasses. There have been reports of silver diethyldithiocarbamate being modified into an electrode to be used for similar purposes.

This method of determining arsenic levels in water is compared to the Gutzeit procedure and has the advantages of faster hydrogen gas absorption and more objective color interpretation.
