= Spin transition =

The spin transition is an example of transition between two electronic states in molecular chemistry, which have nearly identical energy levels. The ability of an electron to transit from a stable to another stable (or metastable) electronic state in a reversible and detectable fashion, makes these molecular systems appealing in the field of molecular electronics.

== In octahedral surroundings ==
When a transition metal ion of configuration $d^{n}$, $n=4$ to $7$, is in octahedral surroundings, its ground state may be low spin (LS) or high spin (HS), depending to a first approximation on the magnitude of the $\Delta$ energy gap between $e_{g}$ and $t_{2g}$ metal orbitals relative to the mean spin pairing energy $P$ (see Crystal field theory). More precisely, for $\Delta>>P$, the ground state arises from the configuration where the $d$ electrons occupy first the $t_{2g}$ orbitals of lower energy, and if there are more than six electrons, the $e_{g}$ orbitals of higher energy. The ground state is then LS. On the other hand, for $\Delta<< P$, Hund's rule is obeyed. The HS ground state has got the same multiplicity as the free metal ion. If the values of $P$ and $\Delta$ are comparable, a LS↔HS transition may occur.

== $d^{n}$ configurations ==
Between all the possible $d^{n}$ configurations of the metal ion, $d^{5}$ and $d^{6}$ are by far the most important. The spin transition phenomenon, in fact, was first observed in 1930 for tris (dithiocarbamato) iron(III) compounds. On the other hand, the iron(II) spin transition complexes were the most extensively studied: among these two of them may be considered as archetypes of spin transition systems, namely Fe(NCS)_{2}(bipy)_{2} and Fe(NCS)_{2}(phen)_{2} (bipy = 2,2'-bipyridine and phen = 1,10-phenanthroline).

== Iron(II) complexes ==
We discuss the mechanism of the spin transition by focusing on the specific case of iron(II) complexes. At the molecular scale the spin transition corresponds to an interionic electron transfer with spin flip of the transferred electrons. For an iron(II) compound this transfer involves two electrons and the spin variations is $\Delta S=2$. The occupancy of the $e_{g}$ orbitals is higher in the HS state than in the LS state and these orbitals are more antibonding than the $t_{2g}$. It follows that the average metal-ligand bond length is longer in the HS state than in the LS state. This difference is in the range 1.4–2.4 pm for iron(II) compounds.

== To induce a spin transition ==
The most common way to induce a spin transition is to change the temperature of the system: the transition will be then characterized by a $\rho_{H}=f(T)$, where $\rho_{H}$ is the molar fraction of molecules in high-spin state. Several techniques are currently used to obtain such curves. The simplest method consists of measuring the temperature dependence of molar susceptibility. Any other technique that provides different responses according to whether the state is LS or HS may also be used to determine $\rho_{H}$. Among these techniques, Mössbauer spectroscopy has been particularly useful in the case of iron compounds, showing two well resolved quadrupole doublets. One of these is associated with LS molecules, the other with HS molecules: the high-spin molar fraction then may be deduced from the relative intensities of the doublets.

== Types of transition ==
Various types of transition have been observed. This may be abrupt, occurring within a few kelvins range, or smooth, occurring within a large temperature range. It could also be incomplete both at low temperature and at high temperature, even if the latter is more often observed. Moreover, the $\rho_{H}=f(T)$ curves may be strictly identical in the cooling or heating modes, or exhibit a hysteresis: in this case the system could assume two different electronic states in a certain range of temperature. Finally the transition may occur in two steps.

== See also ==
- Spin crossover
