= Zineb =

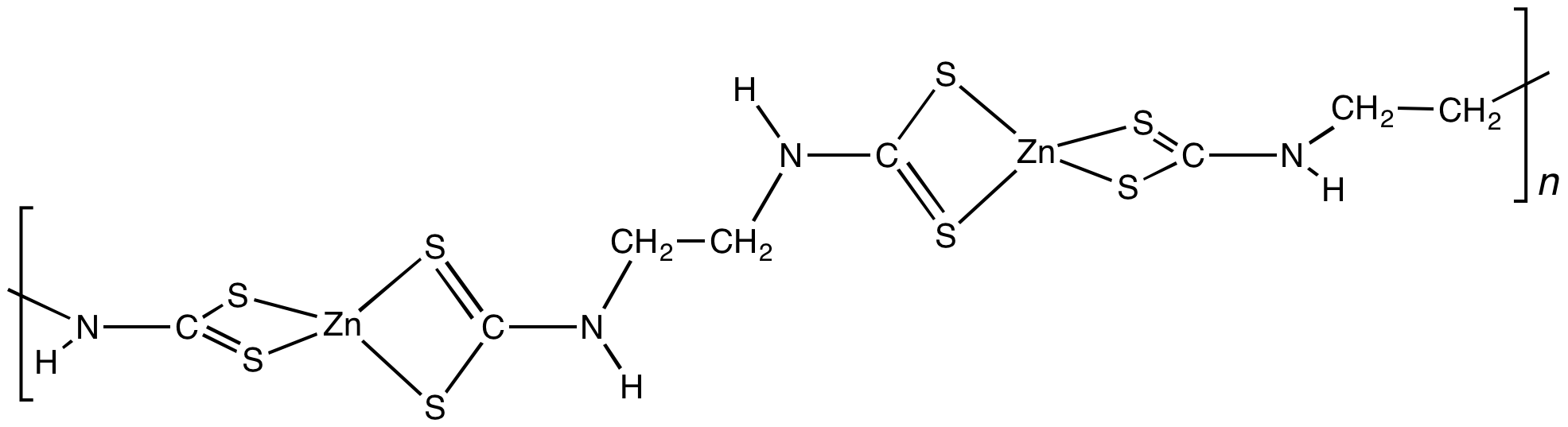

Names
- IUPAC name zinc ethane-1,2-diylbis(dithiocarbamate)
- Other names 1,2 ethanediylbis[dithiocarbamodithioato](2−) zinc, Dithane Z-78, Aphytora, Amitan

Identifiers
CAS Number	12122-67-7
3D model (JSmol)	Interactive image
Beilstein Reference	4165797
ChEBI	CHEBI:52498
ChemSpider	2297309
ECHA InfoCard	100.031.970
EC Number	235-180-1
KEGG	C15232
PubChem CID	3032296
RTECS number	ZH3325000
UNII	X1FSB1OZPT
UN number	2771
CompTox Dashboard (EPA)	DTXSID5021465
- InChI: InChI=1S/C4H8N2S4.Zn/c7-3(8)5-1-2-6-4(9)10;/h1-2H2,(H2,5,7,8)(H2,6,9,10);/q;+2/p-2 Key: AMHNZOICSMBGDH-UHFFFAOYSA-L; InChI=1/C4H8N2S4.Zn/c7-3(8)5-1-2-6-4(9)10;/h1-2H2,(H2,5,7,8)(H2,6,9,10);/q;+2/p-2 Key: AMHNZOICSMBGDH-NUQVWONBAD
- SMILES: [Zn+2].[S-]C(=S)NCCNC(=S)[S-]

Properties
Chemical formula	C_{4}H_{6}N_{2}S_{4}Zn
Molar mass	275.8 g/mol (monomer)
Appearance	pale yellow powder

Hazards
- Occupational safety and health (OHS/OSH)
Main hazards	skin sensitizer
- GHS labelling
Pictograms	(GHS07: Exclamation mark)
Signal word	Warning
Hazard statements	H317, H335
Precautionary statements	P261, P271, P280, P302+P352, P304+P340, P312, P333+P313, P363, P403+P233, P405, P501
- Except where otherwise noted, data are given for materials in their standard state (at 25 °C [77 °F], 100 kPa). verify (what is ?) Infobox references

Zineb is the chemical compound with the formula {Zn[S_{2}CN(H)CH_{2}CH_{2}N(H)CS_{2}]}_{n}. Structurally, it is classified as a coordination polymer and a dithiocarbamate complex. This pale yellow solid is used as fungicide.

== Production and applications ==
It is produced by treating ethylene bis(dithiocarbamate) sodium salt, "nabam", with zinc sulfate. This procedure can be carried out by mixing nabam and zinc sulfate in a spray tank. Its uses include control of downy mildews, rusts, and redfire disease. In the US it was once registered as a "General Use Pesticide", however all registrations were voluntarily cancelled following an EPA special review. It continues to be used in many countries, including the United States.

== Structure ==
Zineb is a polymeric complex of zinc with a dithiocarbamate. The polymer is composed of Zn(dithiocarbamate)_{2} subunits linked by an ethylene (-CH_{2}CH_{2}-) backbone. A reference compound is [Zn(S_{2}CNEt_{2})_{2}]_{2}, which features a pair of tetrahedral Zn centers bridged by one sulfur center.

== See also ==
- Metam sodium - A related dithiocarbamate salt which is also used as a fungicide.
- Maneb - ethylene bis(dithiocarbamate) with manganese instead of zinc.
- Mancozeb - A common fungicide containing Zineb and Maneb.
