= Sodium diethyldithiocarbamate =

Chemical compound

Names
- Preferred IUPAC name Sodium diethylcarbamodithioate

Identifiers
CAS Number	148-18-5; 20624-25-3 trihydrate
3D model (JSmol)	Interactive image
ChEMBL	ChEMBL107217
ChemSpider	8642
ECHA InfoCard	100.005.192
PubChem CID	533728
UNII	A5304YEB5E
CompTox Dashboard (EPA)	DTXSID3022956
- InChI: InChI=1S/C5H11NS2.Na/c1-3-6(4-2)5(7)8;/h3-4H2,1-2H3,(H,7,8);/q;+1/p-1 Key: IOEJYZSZYUROLN-UHFFFAOYSA-M; InChI=1/C5H11NS2.Na/c1-3-6(4-2)5(7)8;/h3-4H2,1-2H3,(H,7,8);/q;+1/p-1 Key: IOEJYZSZYUROLN-REWHXWOFAF
- SMILES: [Na+].[S-]C(=S)N(CC)CC

Properties
Chemical formula	(CH_{3}CH_{2})_{2}NCS_{2}Na
Molar mass	171.259 g/mol (anhydrous)
Appearance	White, slightly brown, or slightly pink crystalline solid
Density	1.1 g/cm^{3}
Melting point	95 °C (203 °F; 368 K)
Solubility in water	Soluble
Solubility	soluble in alcohol, acetone insoluble in ether, benzene

Hazards
- Occupational safety and health (OHS/OSH)
Main hazards	Harmful

Related compounds
Other cations	Silver diethyldithiocarbamate
- Except where otherwise noted, data are given for materials in their standard state (at 25 °C [77 °F], 100 kPa). verify (what is ?) Infobox references

Sodium diethyldithiocarbamate is the organosulfur compound with the formula (CH_{3}CH_{2})_{2}NCS^{−}_{2}Na^{+}. It is a pale yellow, water soluble salt. It is a precursor to the drug disulfiram.

== Preparation ==
Sodium diethyldithiocarbamate typically crystallizes from water as the trihydrate (CH_{3}CH_{2})_{2}NCS_{2}Na·3H_{2}O. The anhydrous salt and the trihydrate are often used interchangeably.

Sodium diethyldithiocarbamate is obtained by treating carbon disulfide with diethylamine in the presence of sodium hydroxide:

CS_{2} + HN(C_{2}H_{5})_{2} + NaOH → NaS_{2}CN(C_{2}H_{5})_{2} + H_{2}O

Other dithiocarbamates can be prepared similarly from secondary amines and carbon disulfide. They are used as chelating agents for transition metal ions and as precursors to herbicides and vulcanization reagents.

== Reactions ==
Iron tris(diethyldithiocarbamate), a black solid that is soluble in organic solvents, is a representative complex of diethyldithiocarbamate.

Oxidation of sodium diethyldithiocarbamate gives the disulfide, also called a thiuram disulfide:

2 (C_{2}H_{5})_{2}NCS_{2}Na + H_{2}O_{2} → (C_{2}H_{5})_{2}NC(S)−S_{2}−C(S)N(C_{2}H_{5})_{2} + 2 NaOH

Dithiocarbamates are nucleophiles and thus can be alkylated. Even dichloromethane suffices:

2 NaS_{2}CNEt_{2} + CH_{2}Cl_{2} → CH_{2}(S_{2}CNEt_{2})_{2} + 2 NaCl

Diethyldithiocarbamate reacts with many metal salts to give transition metal dithiocarbamate complexes. The ligands coordinate via the two sulfur atoms. Other more complicated bonding modes are known including binding as unidentate ligand and a bridging ligand using one or both sulfur atoms.

== Laboratory and practical use ==
By the technique of spin trapping, complexes of dithiocarbamates with iron provide one of the very few methods to study the formation of nitric oxide (NO) radicals in biological materials. Although the lifetime of NO in tissues is too short to allow detection of this radical itself, NO readily binds to iron-dithiocarbamate complexes. The resulting mono-nitrosyl-iron complex (MNIC) is stable, and may be detected with Electron Paramagnetic Resonance (EPR) spectroscopy.

The zinc chelation of diethyldithiocarbamate inhibits metalloproteinases, which in turn prevents the degradation of extracellular matrix, an initial step in cancer metastasis and angiogenesis.

Diethyldithiocarbamate inhibits superoxide dismutase, which can both have antioxidant and oxidant effects on cells, depending on the time of administration.
