= Intersystem crossing =

Excited state dynamic

Intersystem crossing (ISC) is an isoenergetic radiationless process involving a transition between the two electronic states with different spin multiplicity.

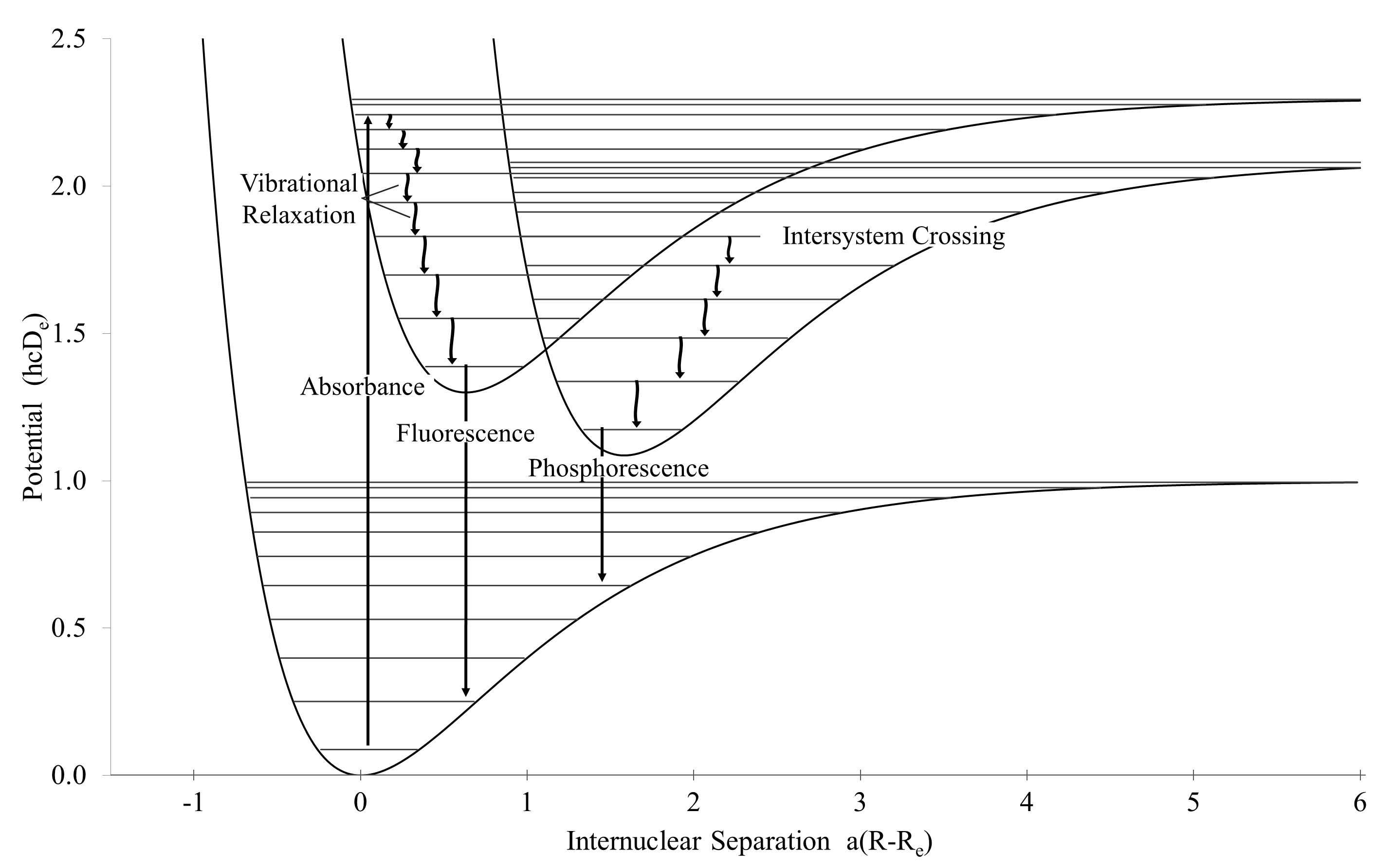
Excited electrons can undergo intersystem crossing to a degenerate state with a different spin multiplicity.

== Excited singlet and triplet states ==
When an electron in a molecule with a singlet ground state is excited (via absorption of radiation) to a higher energy level, either an excited singlet state or an excited triplet state will form. Singlet state is a molecular electronic state such that all electron spins are paired. That is, the spin of the excited electron is still paired with the ground state electron (a pair of electrons in the same energy level must have opposite spins, per the Pauli exclusion principle). In a triplet state the excited electron is no longer paired with the ground state electron; that is, they are parallel (same spin). Since excitation to a triplet state involves an additional "forbidden" spin transition, it is less probable that a triplet state will form when the molecule absorbs radiation.

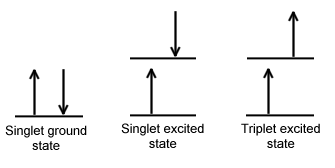
Singlet and triplet energy levels.

When a singlet state nonradiatively passes to a triplet state, or conversely a triplet transitions to a singlet, that process is known as intersystem crossing. In essence, the spin of the excited electron is reversed. The probability of this process occurring is more favorable when the vibrational levels of the two excited states overlap, since little or no energy must be gained or lost in the transition. As the spin/orbital interactions in such molecules are substantial and a change in spin is thus more favourable, intersystem crossing is most common in heavy-atom molecules (e.g. those containing iodine or bromine). This process is called "spin-orbit coupling". Simply-stated, it involves coupling of the electron spin with the orbital angular momentum of non-circular orbits. In addition, the presence of paramagnetic species in solution enhances intersystem crossing.

The radiative decay from an excited triplet state back to a singlet state is known as phosphorescence. Since a transition in spin multiplicity occurs, phosphorescence is a manifestation of intersystem crossing. The time scale of intersystem crossing is on the order of 10^{−8} to 10^{−3} s, one of the slowest forms of relaxation.

== Metal complexes ==
Once a metal complex undergoes metal-to-ligand charge transfer, the system can undergo intersystem crossing, which, in conjunction with the tunability of MLCT excitation energies, produces a long-lived intermediate whose energy can be adjusted by altering the ligands used in the complex. Another species can then react with the long-lived excited state via oxidation or reduction, thereby initiating a redox pathway via tunable photoexcitation. Complexes containing high atomic number d^{6} metal centers, such as Ru(II) and Ir(III), are commonly used for such applications due to them favoring intersystem crossing as a result of their more intense spin-orbit coupling.

Complexes that have access to d orbitals are able to access spin multiplicities besides the singlet and triplet states, as some complexes have orbitals of similar or degenerate energies so that it is energetically favorable for electrons to be unpaired. It is possible then for a single complex to undergo multiple intersystem crossings, which is the case in light-induced excited spin-state trapping (LIESST), where, at low temperatures, a low-spin complex can be irradiated and undergo two instances of intersystem crossing. For Fe(II) complexes, the first intersystem crossing occurs from the singlet to the triplet state, which is then followed by intersystem crossing between the triplet and the quintet state. At low temperatures, the low-spin state is favored, but the quintet state is unable to relax back to the low-spin ground state due to their differences in zero-point energy and metal-ligand bond length. The reverse process is also possible for cases such as [Fe(ptz)_{6}](BF_{4})_{2}, but the singlet state is not fully regenerated, as the energy needed to excite the quintet ground state to the necessary excited state to undergo intersystem crossing to the triplet state overlaps with multiple bands corresponding to excitations of the singlet state that lead back to the quintet state.

== Applications ==
=== Fluorophores ===
Fluorescence microscopy relies upon fluorescent compounds, or fluorophores, in order to image biological systems. Since fluorescence and phosphorescence are competitive methods of relaxation, a fluorophore that undergoes intersystem crossing to the triplet excited state no longer fluoresces and instead remains in the triplet excited state, which has a relatively long lifetime, before phosphorescing and relaxing back to the singlet ground state so that it may continue to undergo repeated excitation and fluorescence. This process in which fluorophores temporarily do not fluoresce is called blinking. While in the triplet excited state, the fluorophore may undergo photobleaching, a process in which the fluorophore reacts with another species in the system, which can lead to the loss of the fluorescent characteristic of the fluorophore.

In order to regulate these processes dependent upon the triplet state, the rate of intersystem crossing can be adjusted to either favor or disfavor formation of the triplet state. Fluorescent biomarkers, including both quantum dots and fluorescent proteins, are often optimized in order to maximize quantum yield and intensity of fluorescent signal, which in part is accomplished by decreasing the rate of intersystem crossing. Methods of adjusting the rate of intersystem crossing include the addition of Mn^{2+} to the system, which increases the rate of intersystem crossing for rhodamine and cyanine dyes. The changing of the metal that is a part of the photosensitizer groups bound to CdTe quantum dots can also affect rate of intersystem crossing, as the use of a heavier metal can cause intersystem crossing to be favored due to the heavy atom effect.

=== Solar cells ===
The viability of organometallic polymers in bulk heterojunction organic solar cells has been investigated due to their donor capability. The efficiency of charge separation at the donor-acceptor interface can be improved through the use of heavy metals, as their increased spin-orbit coupling promotes the formation of the triplet MLCT excited state, which could improve exciton diffusion length and reduce the probability of recombination due to the extended lifespan of the spin-forbidden excited state. By improving the efficiency of charge separation step of the bulk heterojunction solar cell mechanism, the power conversion efficiency also improves. Improved charge separation efficiency has been shown to be a result of the formation of the triplet excited state in some conjugated platinum-acetylide polymers. However, as the size of the conjugated system increases, the increased conjugation reduces the impact of the heavy atom effect and instead makes the polymer more efficient due to the increased conjugation reducing the bandgap.

== History ==
In 1933, Aleksander Jabłoński published his conclusion that the extended lifetime of phosphorescence was due to a metastable excited state at an energy lower than the state first achieved upon excitation. Based upon this research, Gilbert Lewis and coworkers, during their investigation of organic molecule luminescence in the 1940s, concluded that this metastable energy state corresponded to the triplet electron configuration. The triplet state was confirmed by Lewis via application of a magnetic field to the excited phosphor, as only the metastable state would have a long enough lifetime to be analyzed and the phosphor would have only responded if it was paramagnetic due to it having at least one unpaired electron. Their proposed pathway of phosphorescence included the forbidden spin transition occurring when the potential energy curves of the singlet excited state and the triplet excited state crossed, from which the term intersystem crossing arose.

== See also ==
- Internal conversion (chemistry)
- Jablonski diagram
- Michael Kasha
- Population inversion
- Vibrational energy relaxation
