= Spin crossover =

Phenomenon in some metal complexes

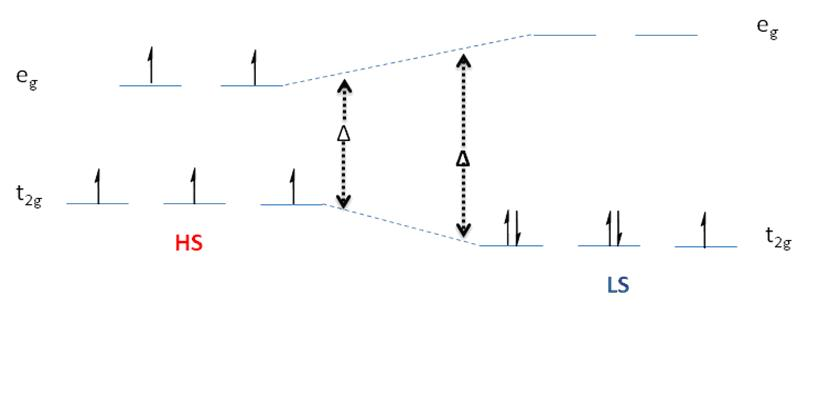
Dependence of the high spin (HS) vs low spin (LS) on Δ of the octahedral ligand field splitting for the d^{5} case.

Spin crossover (SCO) is a phenomenon that occurs in some metal complexes wherein the spin state of the complex changes due to an external stimulus. The stimuli can include temperature, pressure or radiation. Spin crossover is referred to as spin transition if takes place suddenly, or spin equilibrium, when is gradual. However, this terminology is not strict, the "cross-over" and "transition" being often considered equivalent. The change in spin state usually involves transformation from a low spin (LS) ground state (at low temperatures and/or high pressure) towards a high spin (HS) ground configuration (at high temperature or reduced/normal pressure).

Spin crossover is commonly observed with first row transition metal complexes with a d^{4} through d^{7} electron configuration in an octahedral ligand geometry. Spin transition curves typically plot the high-spin molar fraction against temperature. The abruptness with hysteresis indicates cooperativity, or "communication", between neighboring metal complexes, throughout the whole lattice. A transparent account of cooperative lattice effects is the mechano-elastic model of spin transition, developed in terms of volume changes of molecular units, along the spin state swap and intermolecular effects assumed as harmonic oscillators. The spin crossover, or spin transition is a neat example of bi-stability. A material is bistable when it exists in the two different states, with distinct properties, the form being tunable by external stimuli (e.g. temperature). The two-step transition is relatively rare but is observed, for example, with dinuclear SCO complexes for which the spin transition in one metal center renders the transition in the second metal center less favorable. Several types of spin crossover have been identified; some of them are light induced excited spin-state trapping (LIESST), ligand-driven light induced spin change (LD-LISC), and charge transfer induced spin transition (CTIST).

== History ==
SCO was first observed in 1931 by Cambi et al. who discovered anomalous magnetic behavior for the tris(N,N-dialkyldithiocarbamatoiron(III) complexes. The spin states of these complexes were sensitive to the nature of the amine substituents. In the 1960s, the first Co^{II} SCO complex was reported. Magnetic measurements and Mössbauer spectroscopic studies established the nature of the spin transition in iron(II) SCO complexes. Building on those early studies, there is now interest in applications of SCO in electronic and optical displays.

== Characterization tools ==
Structures of tris(2-picolylamine)Fe(II) in two spin states.

Due to the changes in magnetic properties that occur from a spin transition - the complex being less magnetic in a LS state and more magnetic in a HS state - magnetic susceptibility measurements are key to characterization of spin crossover compounds. The magnetic susceptibility as a function of temperature, (χT) is the principal technique used to characterize SCO complexes.

Another very useful technique for characterizing SCO complexes, especially iron complexes, is ^{57}Fe Mössbauer spectroscopy. This technique is especially sensitive to magnetic effects. When spectra are recorded as a function of temperature, the areas under the curves of the absorption peaks are proportional to the fraction of HS and LS states in the sample.

SCO induces changes in metal-to-ligand bond distances due to the population or depopulation of the e_{g} orbitals that have a slight antibonding character. Consequently X-ray crystallography above and below transition temperatures will generally reveal changes in metal-ligand bond lengths. Transitions from a HS to a LS state cause a decrease in and a strengthening of the metal-ligand bond. These changes are also manifested in FT-IR and Raman spectra.

The spin crossover phenomenon is very sensitive to grinding, milling and pressure, but Raman spectroscopy has the advantage that the sample does not require further preparation, in contrast to Fourier Transform Infrared spectroscopy, FT-IR, techniques; highly colored samples may affect the measurements however. Raman spectroscopy is also advantageous because it allows perturbation of the sample with external stimuli to induce SCO. Thermally induced spin crossover is due to the higher electronic degeneracies of the LS form and lower vibrational frequencies of the HS form, thus increasing the entropy. The Raman spectrum of an iron(II) complex in the HS and LS state, emphasizing the changes in the M-L vibrational modes, where a shift from 2114 cm^{−1} to 2070 cm^{−1} corresponds to changes in the stretching vibrational modes of the thiocyanate ligand from a LS state to a HS state, respectively.

SCO behavior can be followed with UV-vis spectroscopy. In some cases, the absorption bands obscured due to the high intensity absorption bands caused by the Metal-to-Ligand Charge Transfer (MLCT) absorption bands.

== Perturbation methods ==
=== Thermal Perturbation ===
Thermal perturbations are the most common type of external stimulus used to induce SCO. One example is [Fe^{II}(tmphen)_{2}]_{3}[Co^{III}(CN)_{6}]_{2} trigonal bipyramid (TBP), with the Fe^{II} centers in the equatorial positions. The HS Fe^{II} remains under 20% i the range of 4.2 K to 50 K, but at room temperature about two-thirds of the Fe^{II} ions in the sample are HS, as shown by the absorption band at 2.1 mm/s, while the other third of the ions remain in the LS state. The thermally induced spin transition is an entropy driven process. Around 25% of the total entropy gain from the LS to HS transition originates from the increase in spin multiplicity according to the relationship:

$\Delta{S}_{mult}= R \cdot ln((2S+1)_{HS} / (2S+1)_{LS})$

and the larger contribution arises from vibrational effects, since the metal-ligand bond distances are larger in the HS state.

=== Pressure Perturbation ===
SCO is also influenced by the application of pressure, which changes the population of the HS and LS states. Upon application of pressure, a conversion from the HS state to the LS state and a shift from T_{1/2}, (the temperature at which half of the complex is in a LS state), to higher temperatures will occur. This effect results from an increase in the zero point energy difference, ΔE°_{HL}, caused by an increase in the relative vertical displacement of the potential wells and a decrease in the activation energy, ΔW°_{HL}, which favors the LS state. The complex Fe(phen)_{2}(SCN)_{2} exhibits this effect. At high pressures the LS state predominates and the transition temperature increases. At high pressures the compound is almost entirely transformed to the LS state at room temperature. As a result of the application of pressure on the Fe(phen)_{2}(SCN)_{2} compound, the bond lengths are affected. The difference in M-L bond lengths in both HS and LS states changes the entropy of the system. The change in spin transition temperature, T_{1/2} and pressure obeys the Clausius-Clapeyron relationship:

$\frac{\partial {{T}_{{}^{1}\!\!\diagup\!\!{}_{2}\;}}}{\partial P}=\frac{\text{ }\!\!\Delta\!\!\text{ V}}{\text{ }\!\!\Delta\!\!\text{ }{{S}_{HL}}}$

The increase in pressure will decrease the volume of the unit cell of the Fe(phen)_{2}(SCN)_{2} and increase the T_{1/2} of the system. A linear relationship between T_{1/2} and pressure for Fe(phen)_{2}(SCN)_{2}, where the slope of the line is $\frac{\partial {{T}_{{}^{1}\!\!\diagup\!\!{}_{2}\;}}}{\partial P}$.

=== Light Perturbation ===
In Light Induced Excited Spin State Trapping (LIESST), the HS-LS transition is triggered by irradiating the sample. At low temperatures it is possible to trap compounds in the HS state - a phenomenon known as the LIESST effect. The compound can be converted back to a LS state by irradiation with a photon of different energy. Irradiation of d-d transitions of the LS metal complex or MLCT absorption bands leads to population of HS states. A good example to illustrate the LIESST effect is the complex [Fe(1-propyltetrazole)_{6}](BF4)_{2}. The sample was irradiated with green light at temperatures below 50 K. By doing this, a spin allowed transition is promoted which is ^{1}A_{1} → ^{1}T_{1}. However, the ^{1}T_{1} excited state has a very short lifetime, decreasing the probability for the excited state to relax via a double intersystem crossing to reach the ^{5}T_{2} HS state . Since the HS state is spin forbidden the lifetime for this state is long, therefore it can be trapped at low temperatures.

Due to the aim to design photoswitchable materials that have higher working temperatures than those reported to date (~80 K), along with long-lifetime photoexcited states, another strategy for SCO called Ligand-Driven Light Induced Spin Change (LD-LISC) has been studied. This method consists of using a ligand that is photosensitive in order to trigger the spin interconversion of the metal ion and exciting this ligand with light. The LD-LISC effect is followed by a structural change of the photoresponsive ligands in contrast to the SCO process where the structures of the ligands are essentially unaffected. The driving force behind the metal ion SCO in this photochemical transformation is cis-trans photoisomerization. The prerequisite for LD-LISC to be observed is that the two complexes formed with the ligand photoisomers, must exhibit different magnetic behaviors as a function of temperature. Upon successive irradiations of the system at two different wavelengths within a temperature range where the metal ion can either be LS or HS, a spin-state interconversion should occur. In order to achieve this, it is convenient to design a metal environment to where at least one of the complexes exhibits a thermally induced SCO. The LD-LISC has been observed in several iron(II) and iron(III) complexes.

== Applications ==
The SCO phenomenon has potential uses as switches, data storage devices, and optical displays. These potential applications would exploit the bistability (HS and LS) which leads to changes in the colour and magnetism of samples. Molecular switches, like electrical switches, require a mechanism that for turning ON and OFF, as is achieved with the abrupt spin transitions with hysteresis. In order for the size of data storage devices to be reduced while the capacity of them increase, smaller units (such as molecules) that exhibit a bistability and thermal hysteresis are required. One research goal is to develop new materials where the SCO response time can be decreased from nanoseconds, as we know it, to femtoseconds. One of the advantages of SCO phenomena is the absence of fatigue, because there is an intraelectronic transition instead of an electron displacement through space.

== Additional reading ==
- Wentzcovitch, R. M.; Justo, J. F.; Wu, Z.; da Silva, C. R. S.; Yuen, D. A.; Kohlstedt, D. (2009). "Anomalous compressibility of ferropericlase throughout the iron spin cross-over". Proc. Natl. Acad. Sci. USA. 106 (21): 8447–8452. arXiv:1307.3270. Bibcode:2009PNAS..106.8447W. doi:10.1073/pnas.0812150106. PMC 2681316. PMID 19439661.
- Wu, Z.; Justo, J. F.; da Silva, C. R. S.; de Gironcoli, S.; Wentzcovitch, R. M. (2009). "Anomalous thermodynamic properties in ferropericlase throughout its spin crossover transition". Phys. Rev. B. 80 (1) 014409. Bibcode:2009PhRvB..80a4409W. doi:10.1103/PhysRevB.80.014409.
