= Iron tris(dimethyldithiocarbamate) =

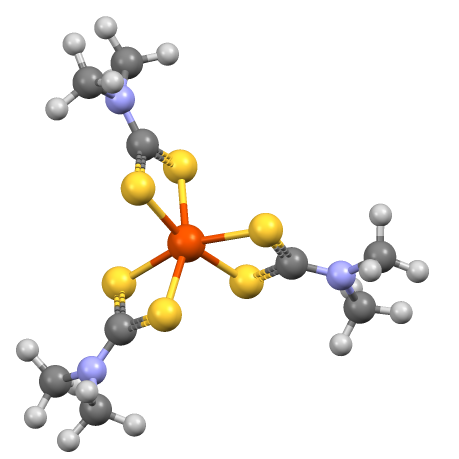

Names
- IUPAC name Tris(dimethyldithiocarbamato)iron
- Other names Ferric dimethyl dithiocarbamate, Ferbam

Identifiers
CAS Number	14484-64-1
3D model (JSmol)	coordination form: Interactive image; ionic form: Interactive image
ChEBI	CHEBI:5015
ChemSpider	24884
ECHA InfoCard	100.034.970
EC Number	238-484-2
KEGG	C11223
PubChem CID	26710
RTECS number	NO8750000
UNII	SKM8W5154H
UN number	3077, 2771
CompTox Dashboard (EPA)	DTXSID8020624
- InChI: InChI=1S/3C3H7NS2.Fe/c3*1-4(2)3(5)6;/h3*1-2H3,(H,5,6);/q;;;+3/p-3 Key: WHDGWKAJBYRJJL-UHFFFAOYSA-K
- SMILES: coordination form: CN(C)C(S1)S[Fe]123(SC(S2)N(C)C)SC(S3)N(C)C; ionic form: CN(C)C(=S)[S-].[Fe+3].CN(C)C(=S)[S-].CN(C)C(=S)[S-]

Properties
Chemical formula	[(CH_{3})_{2}NCS_{2}]_{3}Fe
Molar mass	416.5 g/mol
Appearance	Dark brown to black, odorless solid
Density	1.52 g/cm^{3}
Melting point	Decomposes above 180 °C (356 °F)
Boiling point	Decomposes
Solubility in water	0.01% (20 °C)

Hazards
- Occupational safety and health (OHS/OSH)
Main hazards	Reacts with strong oxidizers, moisture
- GHS labelling
Pictograms	(GHS07: Exclamation mark) (GHS09: Environmental hazard)
Signal word	Warning
Hazard statements	H315, H319, H335, H410
Precautionary statements	P261, P264, P264+P265, P271, P273, P280, P302+P352, P304+P340, P305+P351+P338, P319, P321, P332+P317, P337+P317, P362+P364, P391, P403+P233, P405, P501
- Lethal dose or concentration (LD, LC)
LD_{50} (median dose)	3000 mg/kg (rabbit, oral); 2000 mg/kg (guinea pig, oral); 1130 mg/kg (rat, oral); 3400 mg/kg (mouse, oral)
- NIOSH (US health exposure limits)
PEL (Permissible)	TWA 15 mg/m^{3}
REL (Recommended)	TWA 10 mg/m^{3}
IDLH (Immediate danger)	800 mg/m^{3}
- Except where otherwise noted, data are given for materials in their standard state (at 25 °C [77 °F], 100 kPa). Infobox references

Iron tris(dimethyldithiocarbamate) is the coordination complex of iron with dimethyldithiocarbamate with the formula Fe(S_{2}CNMe_{2})_{3} (Me = methyl). It is marketed as a fungicide.

== Synthesis, structure, bonding ==
Iron tris(dithiocarbamate)s are typically are prepared by salt metathesis reactions.

Iron tris(dimethyldithiocarbamate) is an octahedral coordination complex of iron(III) with D_{3} symmetry.

Spin crossover (SCO) was first observed in 1931 by Cambi et al. who discovered anomalous magnetic behavior for the tris(N,N-dialkyldithiocarbamatoiron(III) complexes. The spin states of these complexes are sensitive to the nature of the amine substituents.

== Reactions ==
Iron tris(dithiocarbamate)s react with nitric oxide to give the green nitrosyl complex:

Fe(dtc)_{3} + NO → Fe(dtc)_{_{2}}NO + 0.5 (dtc)_{2}

This efficient chemical trapping reaction provides a means to detect NO.

Reflecting the strongly donating properties of dithiocarbamate ligands, iron tris(dithiocarbamate)s oxidize at relatively mild potentials to give isolable iron(IV) derivatives [Fe(S_{2}CNR_{2})_{3}]^{+}.

Iron tris(dithiocarbamate)s react with hydrochloric acid to give the pentacoordinate chloride:

Fe(dtc)_{3} + HCl → Fe(dtc)_{_{2}}Cl + Hdtc

== Safety ==
The U.S. Occupational Safety and Health Administration (OSHA) has set the legal (permissible exposure limit) for ferbam exposure in the workplace as 15 mg/m^{3} over an 8-hour workday. The U.S. National Institute for Occupational Safety and Health (NIOSH) has set a recommended exposure limit (REL) of 1 mg/m^{3} over an 8-hour workday. At levels of 800 mg/m^{3}, ferbam is immediately dangerous to life and health.

== See also ==
- Zinc dimethyldithiocarbamate - a related dimethyldithiocarbamate complex of zinc
- Nickel bis(dimethyldithiocarbamate) - a related dimethyldithiocarbamate complex of nickel
- Iron tris(diethyldithiocarbamate) - a related complex of iron derived from diethyldithiocarbamate
