= Dithiocarbamate =

Chemical group (>N–C(=S)–S–)

Dithiocarbamate anion

Identifiers
CAS Number	4384-82-1
3D model (JSmol)	Interactive image
ChemSpider	2300955
PubChem CID	3037131
UNII	5XK73BNP7Q
- InChI: InChI=1S/CH3NS2/c2-1(3)4/h(H3,2,3,4)/p-1 Key: DKVNPHBNOWQYFE-UHFFFAOYSA-M
- SMILES: C(=S)(N)[S-]

Properties
Chemical formula	CH_{2}NS_{2}^{−}
Molar mass	92.15 g·mol^{−1}

Related compounds
Related compounds	Thiocarbamate; Dithiocarbonate; Thioxanthate
- Except where otherwise noted, data are given for materials in their standard state (at 25 °C [77 °F], 100 kPa). Infobox references

General chemical structure of dithiocarbamate esters. R and R" is any group (typically hydrogen or organyl), and R' is organyl.

In organic chemistry, a dithiocarbamate is a chemical compound with the general formula R_{2}N−C(=S)−S−R. It contains the functional group with the structure >N−C(=S)−S−. It is the analog of a carbamate in which both oxygen atoms are replaced by sulfur atoms (when only one oxygen is replaced the result is thiocarbamate).

Dithiocarbamate also refers to the dithiocarbamate ion R_{2}N−CS^{−}_{2} and its salts. A common example is sodium diethyldithiocarbamate (CH_{3}CH_{2})_{2}N−CS^{−}_{2}Na^{+}. Dithiocarbamates and their derivatives are widely used in the vulcanization of rubber.

== Formation ==
Many secondary amines react with carbon disulfide and sodium hydroxide to form dithiocarbamate salts:

R_{2}NH + CS_{2} + NaOH → R_{2}NCS^{−}_{2}Na^{+} + H_{2}O

Ammonia reacts with CS_{2} similarly, to give ammonium dithiocarbamate:

2 NH_{3} + CS_{2} → H_{2}N−CS^{−}_{2}[NH_{4}]^{+}

Dithiocarbamate salts are pale colored solids that are soluble in water and polar organic solvents.

== Dithiocarbamic acid ==
A primary amine and carbon disulfide react to give a dithiocarbamic acid:

RNH_{2} + CS_{2} → R(H)N−CS_{2}H

In the presence of diimides or pyridine, these acids convert to isothiocyanates:

R(H)N−CS_{2}H + C(=N−R')_{2} → R−N=C=S + S=C(−NHR')_{2}

== Reactions ==
Dithiocarbamates are readily S-alkylated. Thus, methyl dimethyldithiocarbamate can be prepared by methylation of the dithiocarbamate:

(CH_{3})_{2}NCS_{2}Na + (CH_{3}O)_{2}SO_{2} → (CH_{3})_{2}NC(S)SCH_{3} + Na[CH_{3}OSO_{3}]

Oxidation of dithiocarbamates gives the thiuram disulfide:

2 R_{2}NCS^{−}_{2} → [R_{2}NC(S)S]_{2} + 2 e^{−}

Thiuram disulfides react with Grignard reagents to give esters of dithiocarbamic acid:

[R_{2}NC(S)S]_{2} + R'MgX → R_{2}NC(S)SR' + R_{2}NCS_{2}MgX

Dithiocarbamates react with transition metal salts to give a wide variety of transition metal dithiocarbamate complexes.

== Structure and bonding ==
Dithiocarbamates are described by invoking resonance structures that emphasize the pi-donor properties of the amine group. This bonding arrangement is indicated by a short C–N distance and the coplanarity of the NCS_{2} core as well as the atoms attached to N.

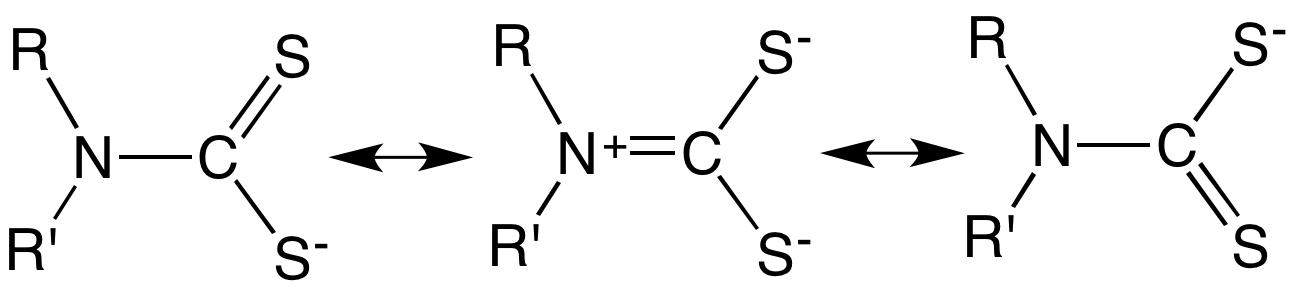
Main resonance structures of a dithiocarbamate anion.

Because of the pi-donation from nitrogen, dithiocarbamates are more basic than structurally related anions such as dithiocarboxylates and xanthates. Consequently, they tend to bind as bidentate ligands. Another consequence of the C–N multiple bonding is that rotation about that bond is subject to a high barrier.

== Applications ==
Several transition metal dithiocarbamate complexes are useful in industry. Zinc dithiocarbamates are used to modify the crosslinking of certain polyolefins with sulfur, a process called vulcanization. They are used as ligands for chelating metals.

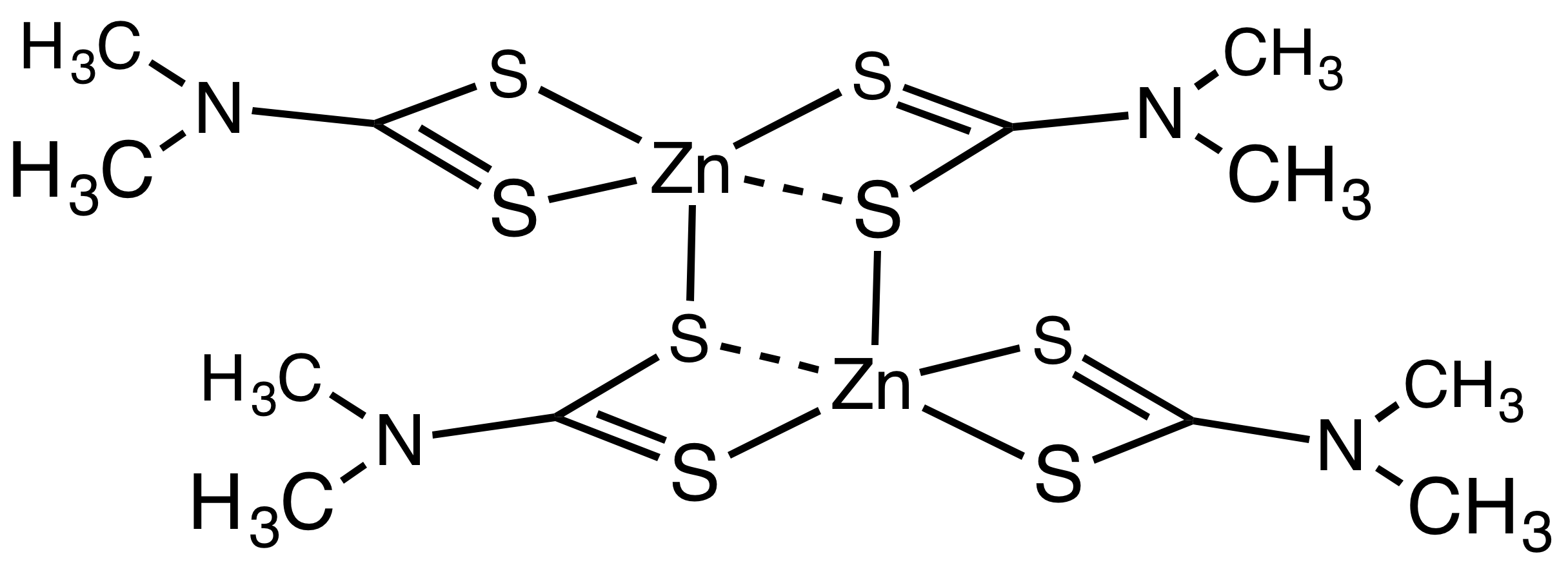
Structure of zinc dimethyldithiocarbamate.

Some dithiocarbamates, specifically ethylene bisdithiocarbamates (EBDCs), in the form of complexes with manganese (maneb), zinc (zineb) or a combination of manganese and zinc (mancozeb), have been used extensively as fungicides in agriculture since the 1940s. In the United States they began to be registered for use in the late 1950s and early 1960s and were quickly put to work on sooty blotch and flyspeck. Many growers switched from captan to EBDCs for the longer residual period. Both captan and EBDCs were the primary treatments for SBFS in that country until the early 1990s when the US Environmental Protection Agency banned EBDCs within 77 days to harvest. This effectively made summer use impossible, reduced EBDC use overall, and radically increased SBFS.

Methylenebis(dibutyldithiocarbamate) is an additive in some extreme pressure gear oils, serving as an antioxidant and protecting metal surfaces.

== See also ==
- Xanthate
