= Zinc bis(dimethyldithiocarbamate) =

Ziram
- Chemical structure of Ziram

Names
- IUPAC name (μ-Dimethylcarbamodithioato-1κS,2κS′)(μ-dimethylcarbamodithioato-1κS′,2κS)bis[(dimethylcarbamodithioato-κ^{2}S,S′)zinc]
- Other names zinc dimethyldithiocarbamate, Ziram

Identifiers
CAS Number	137-30-4
3D model (JSmol)	Interactive image
ChemSpider	8397
ECHA InfoCard	100.004.808
PubChem CID	8722
UNII	73D8UA974J
CompTox Dashboard (EPA)	DTXSID0021464
- InChI: InChI=1S/2C3H7NS2.Zn/c2*1-4(2)3(5)6;/h2*1-2H3,(H,5,6);/q;;+2/p-2 Key: DUBNHZYBDBBJHD-UHFFFAOYSA-L
- SMILES: CN(C)C(=S)[S-].CN(C)C(=S)[S-].[Zn+2]

Properties
Chemical formula	C_{6}H_{12}N_{2}S_{4}Zn
Molar mass	305.80 g·mol^{−1}
Density	1.65 g/cm^{3}
Melting point	246 to 252.5 °C (474.8 to 486.5 °F; 519.1 to 525.6 K)
- Except where otherwise noted, data are given for materials in their standard state (at 25 °C [77 °F], 100 kPa). Infobox references

Zinc dimethyldithiocarbamate is a coordination complex of zinc with dimethyldithiocarbamate. It is a pale yellow solid that is used as a fungicide, the sulfur vulcanization of rubber, and other industrial applications.

== Applications ==
Known as ziram in agriculture, it was introduced in the United States in 1960 as a broad-spectrum fungicide. It was used to address scab on apples and pears, leaf curl in peaches, and anthracnose and blight in tomatoes. In 1981, additional uses for ziram were approved, including the prevention of leaf blight and scab on almonds, shot-hole in apricots, brown rot and leaf spot in cherries, and scab and anthracnose in pecans. Ziram also began to be used on residential ornaments as a bird and mammal repellent. As a protectant fungicide, it is active on the plant's surface where it forms a chemical barrier between the plant and a fungus. A protectant fungicide is not absorbed into the plant and must be applied prior to infection. Ziram can either be directly sprayed on to a plant's leaf or it can be used as a soil and seed treatment. The top five crops ziram is used on are: almonds, peaches, nectarines, pears, and table and raisin grapes.

Alternatively, ziram is used as an additive ingredient in industrial adhesives, caulking, and paint. It also serves as a bird and mammal repellent on outdoor ornamental items.

== Chemistry ==
The compound is a prototypical zinc dithiocarbamate, a broad class of coordination complexes with the formulae Zn(R_{2}NCS_{2})_{2}, where R can be varied. Such compounds are produced by treating zinc and dithiocarbamate (R_{2}NCS_{2}^{−}), as illustrated with dimethyldithiocarbamate:

2 (CH_{3})_{2}NCS_{2}^{−} + Zn^{2+} → Zn((CH_{3})_{2}NCS_{2})_{2}

Annually, approximately 1.9 million pounds of the active ziram ingredient are used. Ziram is often sold in powder or granule form.

Zinc bis(diethyldithiocarbamate) complexes degrade thermally to give zinc sulfide.

=== Structure ===
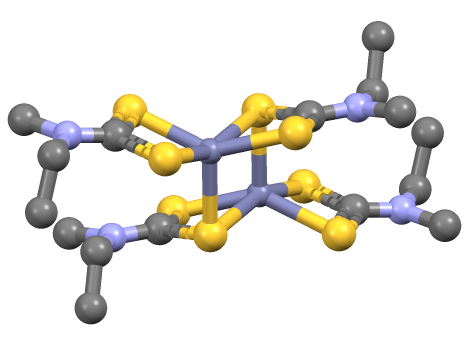
Structure of the ethyl-methyl carbamate derivative [Zn(S_{2}CNEtMe)_{2}]_{2}.

Compounds of the type Zn(S_{2}CNR_{2})_{2} are dimeric, i.e. their proper formula is [Zn(S_{2}CNR_{2})_{2}]_{2}. Each Zn center is in a distorted pentacoordinate site, with four Zn–S bonds of 2.3 Å length and one Zn–S interaction is over 2.8 Å in length. Mono-zinc derivatives are obtained by adding strong ligands (L) such as amines, which give adducts Zn(S_{2}CNR_{2})_{2}L.

== Ecological effects ==
The U.S. Environmental Protection Agency has concluded that ziram poses a low toxicity risk to mammals, a moderate risk to birds, and a high risk to aquatic species. After reviewing studies that investigated the effect of ziram on aquatic organisms, the Pesticide Action Network Pesticide Database concluded that its LC_{50}dose (amount of pesticide that is lethal to 50% of the test organisms within the stated study time) for amphibians places it in the "highly toxic" category.

== See also ==
- Iron tris(dimethyldithiocarbamate) – a related complex, but with three dimethyldithiocarbamate ligands
- Nickel bis(dimethyldithiocarbamate) – a related complex, but where zinc has been replaced with nickel
- Zinc bis(diethyldithiocarbamate) – a closely related complex, but where methyl has been replaced with ethyl
