= Carbon disulfide =

- Carbon disulfide

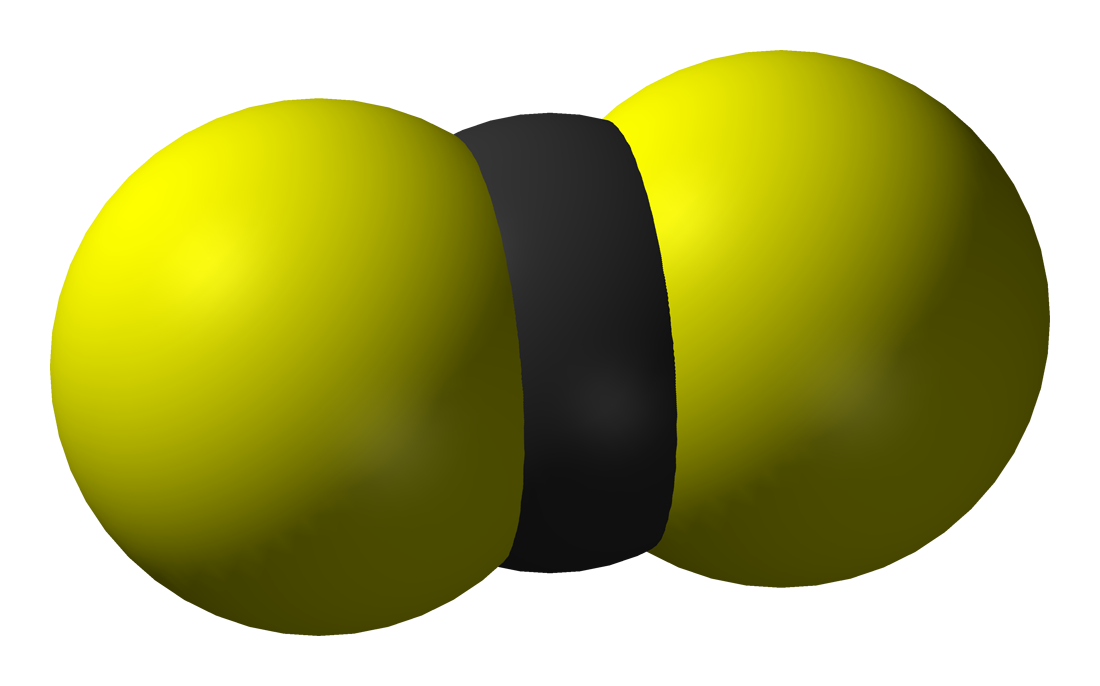

Names
- IUPAC name Carbon disulfide
- Systematic IUPAC name Methanedithione
- Other names Carbon bisulfide Dithiocarbonic anhydride

Identifiers
CAS Number	75-15-0
3D model (JSmol)	Interactive image
Beilstein Reference	1098293
ChEBI	CHEBI:23012
ChEMBL	ChEMBL1365180
ChemSpider	6108
ECHA InfoCard	100.000.767
EC Number	200-843-6
KEGG	C19033
PubChem CID	6348
RTECS number	FF6650000
UNII	S54S8B99E8
UN number	1131
CompTox Dashboard (EPA)	DTXSID6023947
- InChI: InChI=1S/CS2/c2-1-3 Key: QGJOPFRUJISHPQ-UHFFFAOYSA-N; InChI=1/CS2/c2-1-3 Key: QGJOPFRUJISHPQ-UHFFFAOYAS
- SMILES: S=C=S

Properties
Chemical formula	CS_{2}
Molar mass	76.13 g·mol^{−1}
Appearance	Colorless liquid Impure: light-yellow
Odor	Pleasant, ether- or chloroform-like Commercial: Foul, like rotten radish
Density	1.539 g/cm^{3} (−186°C); 1.2927 g/cm^{3} (0 °C); 1.266 g/cm^{3} (25 °C)
Melting point	−111.61 °C (−168.90 °F; 161.54 K)
Boiling point	46.24 °C (115.23 °F; 319.39 K)
Solubility in water	2.58 g/L (0 °C); 2.39 g/L (10 °C); 2.17 g/L (20 °C); 0.14 g/L (50 °C)
Solubility	Soluble in alcohol, ether, benzene, oil, CHCl_{3}, CCl_{4}
Solubility in formic acid	4.66 g/100 g
Solubility in dimethyl sulfoxide	45 g/100 g (20.3 °C)
Vapor pressure	48.1 kPa (25 °C); 82.4 kPa (40 °C)
Magnetic susceptibility (χ)	−42.2·10^{−6} cm^{3}/mol
Refractive index (n_{D})	1.627
Viscosity	0.436 cP (0 °C); 0.363 cP (20 °C)

Structure
Molecular shape	Linear
Dipole moment	0 D (20 °C)

Thermochemistry
Heat capacity (C)	75.73 J/(mol·K)
Std molar entropy (S^{⦵}_{298})	151 J/(mol·K)
Std enthalpy of formation (Δ_{f}H^{⦵}_{298})	88.7 kJ/mol
Gibbs free energy (Δ_{f}G^{⦵})	64.4 kJ/mol
Std enthalpy of combustion (Δ_{c}H^{⦵}_{298})	1687.2 kJ/mol

Hazards
- Occupational safety and health (OHS/OSH)
Inhalation hazards	Irritant; neurotoxin
Eye hazards	Irritant
Skin hazards	Irritant
- GHS labelling
Pictograms	(GHS02: Flammable) (GHS06: Toxic) (GHS07: Exclamation mark) (GHS08: Health hazard)
Signal word	Danger
Hazard statements	H225, H315, H319, H332, H361fd, H372
Precautionary statements	P202, P210, P281, P303+P361+P353, P304+P340+P312, P305+P351+P338, P308+P313; ICSC 0022
NFPA 704 (fire diamond)	3 4 0
Flash point	−43 °C (−45 °F; 230 K)
Autoignition temperature	102 °C (216 °F; 375 K)
Explosive limits	1.3–50%
- Lethal dose or concentration (LD, LC)
LD_{50} (median dose)	3188 mg/kg (rat, oral)
LC_{50} (median concentration)	>1670 ppm (rat, 1 h); 15500 ppm (rat, 1 h); 3000 ppm (rat, 4 h); 3500 ppm (rat, 4 h); 7911 ppm (rat, 2 h); 3165 ppm (mouse, 2 h)
LC_{Lo} (lowest published)	4000 ppm (human, 30 min)
- NIOSH (US health exposure limits)
PEL (Permissible)	TWA 20 ppm C 30 ppm 100 ppm (30-minute maximum peak)
REL (Recommended)	TWA 1 ppm (3 mg/m^{3}) ST 10 ppm (30 mg/m^{3}) [skin]
IDLH (Immediate danger)	500 ppm

Related compounds
Related compounds	Carbon dioxide Carbonyl sulfide Carbon diselenide

Supplementary data page
- Carbon disulfide (data page)
- Except where otherwise noted, data are given for materials in their standard state (at 25 °C [77 °F], 100 kPa). verify (what is ?) Infobox references

Carbon disulfide (also spelled as carbon disulphide) is an inorganic compound with the chemical formula CS_{2} and structure S=C=S. It is a colorless, flammable, neurotoxic liquid that is used as a building block in organic synthesis. Pure carbon disulfide has a pleasant, ether- or chloroform-like odor, but commercial samples are usually yellowish and are typically contaminated with foul-smelling impurities.

== History ==
In 1796, the German chemist Wilhelm August Lampadius (1772–1842) first prepared carbon disulfide by heating pyrite with moist charcoal. He called it "liquid sulfur" (flüssiger Schwefel). The composition of carbon disulfide was finally determined in 1813 by the team of the Swedish chemist Jöns Jacob Berzelius (1779–1848) and the Swiss-British chemist Alexander Marcet (1770–1822). Their analysis was consistent with an empirical formula of CS_{2}.

== Occurrence, manufacture, properties ==
Small amounts of carbon disulfide are released by volcanic eruptions and marshes. CS_{2} once was manufactured by combining carbon (or coke) and sulfur at 800–1000 °C.

C + 2S → CS_{2}

A lower-temperature reaction, requiring only 600 °C, utilizes natural gas as the carbon source in the presence of silica gel or alumina catalysts:

2 CH_{4} + S_{8} → 2 CS_{2} + 4 H_{2}S

The reaction is analogous to the combustion of methane.

Global production/consumption of carbon disulfide is approximately one million tonnes, with China consuming 49%, followed by India at 13%, mostly for the production of rayon fiber. United States production in 2007 was 56,000 tonnes.

=== Solvent ===
Carbon disulfide can dissolve a variety of nonpolar chemicals including phosphorus, sulfur, selenium, bromine, iodine, fats, resins, rubber, and asphalt.

=== Extraterrestrial ===
In March 2024, possible traces of CS_{2} were detected in the atmosphere of the temperate mini-Neptune planet TOI-270 d by the James Webb Space Telescope.

== Reactions ==
Combustion of CS_{2} affords sulfur dioxide according to this ideal stoichiometry:

CS_{2} + 3 O_{2} → CO_{2} + 2 SO_{2}

=== With nucleophiles ===
Compared to the isoelectronic carbon dioxide, CS_{2} is a weaker electrophile. While, however, reactions of nucleophiles with CO_{2} are highly reversible and products are only isolated with very strong nucleophiles, the reactions with CS_{2} are thermodynamically more favored allowing the formation of products with less reactive nucleophiles.

For example, amines afford dithiocarbamates:

2 R_{2}NH + CS_{2} → [R_{2}NH_{2}^{+}][R_{2}NCS_{2}^{−}]

Xanthates form similarly from alkoxides:

RONa + CS_{2} → [Na^{+}][ROCS_{2}^{−}]

This reaction is the basis of the manufacture of regenerated cellulose, the main ingredient of viscose, rayon, and cellophane. Both xanthates and the related thioxanthates (derived from treatment of CS_{2} with sodium thiolates) are used as flotation agents in mineral processing.

Upon treatment with sodium sulfide, carbon disulfide affords trithiocarbonate:

Na_{2}S + CS_{2} → [Na^{+}]_{2}[CS_{3}^{2−}]

Carbon disulfide does not hydrolyze readily, although the process is catalyzed by an enzyme.

=== Reduction ===
Reduction of carbon disulfide with sodium affords sodium 1,3-dithiole-2-thione-4,5-dithiolate together with sodium trithiocarbonate:

4 Na + 4 CS_{2} → Na_{2}C_{3}S_{5} + Na_{2}CS_{3}

=== Chlorination ===
Chlorination of CS_{2} provides a route to carbon tetrachloride:

CS_{2} + 3 Cl_{2} → CCl_{4} + S_{2}Cl_{2}

This conversion proceeds via the intermediacy of thiophosgene, CSCl_{2}.

The disulfur dichloride can chlorinate carbon disulfide again:

CS_{2} + 2 S_{2}Cl_{2} → CCl_{4} + 6 S

=== Coordination chemistry ===
CS_{2} is a ligand for many metal complexes, forming pi complexes. One example is CpCo(η^{2}-CS_{2})(PMe_{3}).

== Polymerization ==
CS_{2} polymerizes upon photolysis or under high pressure to give an insoluble material called car-sul or "Bridgman's black", named after the discoverer of the polymer, Percy Williams Bridgman. Trithiocarbonate (-S-C(S)-S-) linkages comprise, in part, the backbone of the polymer, which is a semiconductor.

== Uses ==
The principal industrial uses of carbon disulfide, consuming 75% of the annual production in 2000, are the manufacture of viscose rayon and cellophane film.

It is also a valued intermediate in chemical synthesis of carbon tetrachloride. It is widely used in the synthesis of organosulfur compounds such as xanthates, which are used in froth flotation, a method for extracting metals from their ores. Carbon disulfide is also a precursor to dithiocarbamates, which are used as drugs (e.g. Metam sodium) and rubber chemistry.

=== Niche uses ===
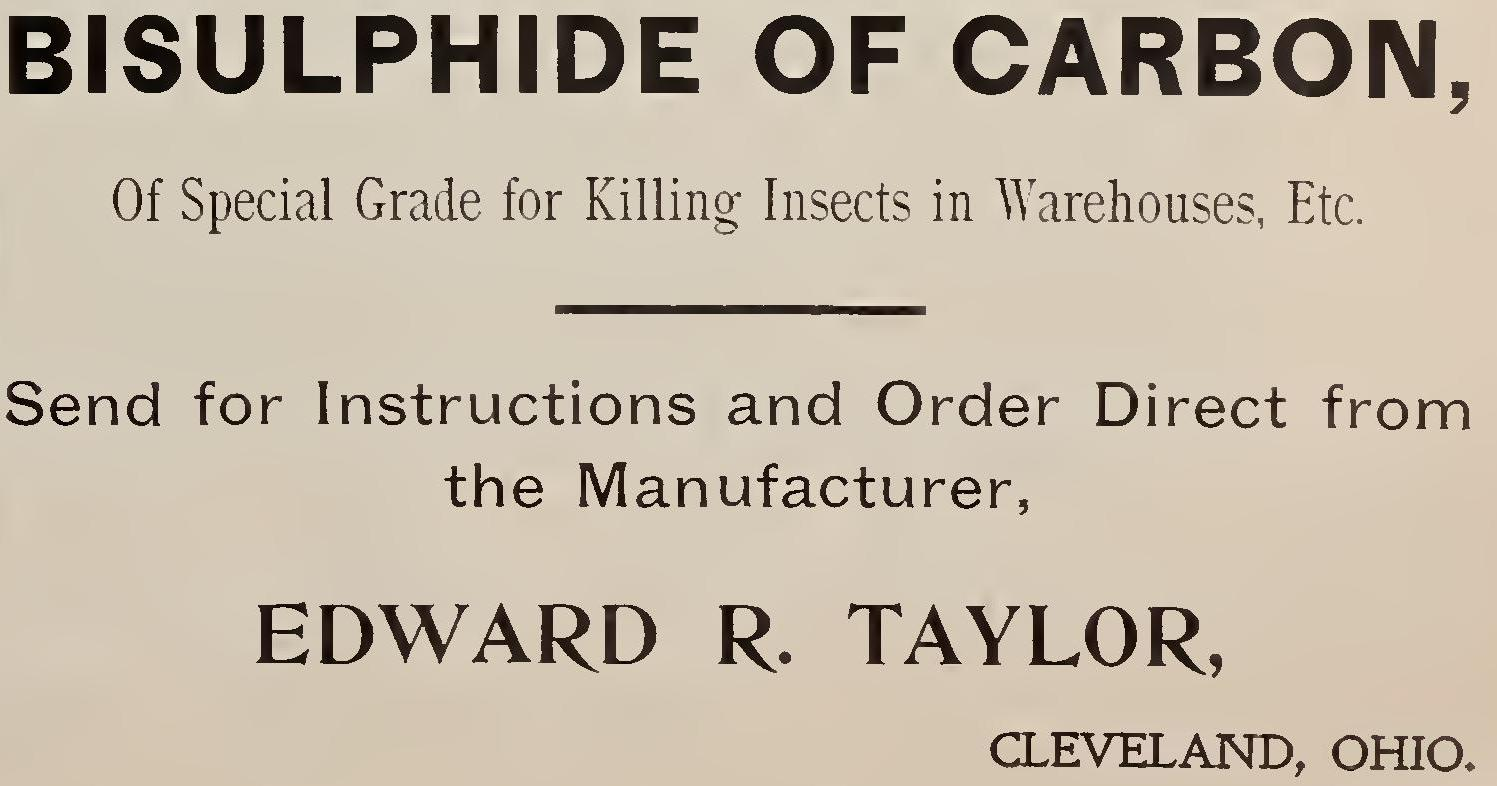
Carbon disulfide insecticide ad from the 1896 issue of The American Elevator and Grain Trade magazine

It can be used in fumigation of airtight storage warehouses, airtight flat storage, bins, grain elevators, railroad box cars, ship holds, barges, and cereal mills. Carbon disulfide is also used as an insecticide for the fumigation of grains, nursery stock, in fresh fruit conservation, and as a soil disinfectant against insects and nematodes.

It can also be used for the Barking dog reaction and its nonlinear optical properties have been extensively studied

== Health effects ==
Carbon disulfide has been linked to both acute and chronic forms of poisoning, with a diverse range of symptoms.

Concentrations of 500–3000 mg/m^{3} cause acute and subacute poisoning. These include a set of mostly neurological and psychiatric symptoms, called encephalopathia sulfocarbonica. Symptoms include acute psychosis (manic delirium, hallucinations), paranoic ideas, loss of appetite, gastrointestinal and sexual disorders, polyneuritis, myopathy, and mood changes (including irritability and anger). Effects observed at lower concentrations include neurological problems (encephalopathy, psychomotor and psychological disturbances, polyneuritis, abnormalities in nerve conduction), hearing problems, vision problems (burning eyes, abnormal light reactions, increased ophthalmic pressure), heart problems (increased deaths for heart disease, angina pectoris, high blood pressure), reproductive problems (increased miscarriages, immobile or deformed sperm), and decreased immune response.

Occupational exposure to carbon disulfide is also associated with cardiovascular disease, particularly stroke.

In 2000, the World Health Organization (WHO) considered that health harms were unlikely at levels below 100 μg/m^{3} over an averaging time of 24 hours, and recommended this as a guideline level. Carbon disulfide can be smelled at levels above 200 μg/m^{3}, and the WHO recommended a sensory guideline of below 20 μg/m^{3}. Exposure to carbon disulfide is well-established to be harmful to health in concentrations at or above 30 mg/m^{3}. Changes in the function of the central nervous system have been observed at concentrations of 20–25 mg/m^{3}. There are also reports of harms to health at 10 mg/m^{3}, for exposures of 10–15 years, but the lack of good data on past exposure levels make the association of these harms with concentrations of 10 mg/m^{3} findings uncertain. The measured concentration of 10 mg/m^{3} may be equivalent to a concentration in the general environment of 1 mg/m^{3}.

=== Environmental sources ===
The primary source of carbon disulfide in the environment is rayon factories. Most global carbon disulfide emissions come from rayon production, as of 2008. Other sources include the production of cellophane, carbon tetrachloride, carbon black, and sulfur recovery. Carbon disulfide production also emits hydrogen sulfide.

As of 2004, about 250 g of carbon disulfide is emitted per kilogram of rayon produced. About 30 g of carbon disulfide is emitted per kilogram of carbon black produced. About 0.341 g of carbon disulfide is emitted per kilogram of sulfur recovered.

Japan has reduced carbon disulfide emissions per kilogram of rayon produced, but in other rayon-producing countries, including China, emissions are assumed to be uncontrolled (based on global modelling and large-scale free-air concentration measurements). Rayon production is steady or decreasing except in China, where it is increasing, as of 2004. Carbon black production in Japan and Korea uses incinerators to destroy about 99% of the carbon disulfide that would otherwise be emitted. When used as a solvent, Japanese emissions are about 40% of the carbon disulfide used; elsewhere, the average is about 80%.

Most rayon production uses carbon sulfide. One exception is rayon made using the lyocell process, which uses a different solvent; as of 2018 the lyocell process is not widely used, because it is more expensive than the viscose process. Cuprammonium rayon also does not use carbon disulfide.

=== Incidence of exposure ===
Industrial workers working with carbon disulfide are at high risk. Emissions may also harm the health of people living near rayon plants.

Concerns about carbon disulfide exposure have a long history. Around 1900, carbon disulfide came to be widely used in the production of vulcanized rubber. The psychosis produced by high exposures was soon apparent (it has been reported with 6 months of exposure). Sir Thomas Oliver told a story about a rubber factory that put bars on its windows so that the workers would not leap out to their deaths. Carbon disulfide use in the US as a heavier-than-air burrow poison for Richardson's ground squirrel also led to reports of psychosis. No systematic medical study of the issue was published, and knowledge was not transferred to the rayon industry.

The first large epidemiological study of rayon workers was done in the US in the late 1930s, and found fairly severe effects in 30% of the workers. Data on increased risks of heart attacks and strokes came out in the late 1960s. Courtaulds, a major rayon manufacturer, worked hard to prevent publication of this data in the UK. Average concentrations in sampled rayon plants were reduced from about 250 mg/m^{3} in 1955–1965 to about 20–30 mg/m^{3} in the 1980s (US figures only?). Rayon production has since largely moved to the developing world, especially China, Indonesia and India.

Rates of disability in factories are unknown as of 2016. Manufacturers using the viscose process do not provide any information on harm to their workers.

== See also ==
- Carbon monosulfide
- Ethenedithione
- Carbon subsulfide
- Carbon diselenide
- Carbon dioxide
- 1949 Holland Tunnel fire, accident with truck carrying carbon disulfide.
