= Krasny Yar (inhabited locality) =

Krasny Yar (Russian: Кра́сный Яр) is the name of several inhabited localities in Russia.

== Modern localities ==
=== Altai Krai ===
As of 2010, four rural localities in Altai Krai bear this name:

- Krasny Yar, Aleysky District, Altai Krai, a selo in Chapayevsky Selsoviet of Aleysky District
- Krasny Yar, Klyuchevsky District, Altai Krai, a selo in Zelenopolyansky Selsoviet of Klyuchevsky District
- Krasny Yar, Shipunovsky District, Altai Krai, a selo in Krasnoyarovsky Selsoviet of Shipunovsky District
- Krasny Yar, Sovetsky District, Altai Krai, a selo in Krasnoyarsky Selsoviet of Sovetsky District

=== Amur Oblast ===
As of 2010, one rural locality in Amur Oblast bears this name:

- Krasny Yar, Amur Oblast, a selo in Zelenoborsky Rural Settlement of Mikhaylovsky District

=== Arkhangelsk Oblast ===
As of 2010, two rural localities in Arkhangelsk Oblast bear this name:

- Krasny Yar, Yemetsky Selsoviet, Kholmogorsky District, Arkhangelsk Oblast, a village in Yemetsky Selsoviet of Kholmogorsky District
- Krasny Yar, Zachachyevsky Selsoviet, Kholmogorsky District, Arkhangelsk Oblast, a village in Zachachyevsky Selsoviet of Kholmogorsky District

=== Astrakhan Oblast ===
As of 2010, one rural locality in Astrakhan Oblast bears this name:

- Krasny Yar, Astrakhan Oblast, a selo in Krasnoyarsky Selsoviet of Krasnoyarsky District

=== Republic of Bashkortostan ===
As of 2010, five rural localities in the Republic of Bashkortostan bear this name:

- Krasny Yar, Iglinsky District, Republic of Bashkortostan, a village in Krasnovoskhodsky Selsoviet of Iglinsky District
- Krasny Yar, Kaltasinsky District, Republic of Bashkortostan, a village in Amzibashevsky Selsoviet of Kaltasinsky District
- Krasny Yar, Kugarchinsky District, Republic of Bashkortostan, a village in Kugarchinsky Selsoviet of Kugarchinsky District
- Krasny Yar, Meleuzovsky District, Republic of Bashkortostan, a khutor in Voskresensky Selsoviet of Meleuzovsky District
- Krasny Yar, Ufimsky District, Republic of Bashkortostan, a selo in Krasnoyarsky Selsoviet of Ufimsky District

=== Republic of Buryatia ===
As of 2010, three rural localities in the Republic of Buryatia bear this name:

- Krasny Yar, Kabansky District, Republic of Buryatia, a selo in Krasnoyarsky Selsoviet of Kabansky District
- Krasny Yar, Kizhinginsky District, Republic of Buryatia, a selo in Kizhinginsky Somon of Kizhinginsky District
- Krasny Yar, Zaigrayevsky District, Republic of Buryatia, a selo in Unegeteysky Selsoviet of Zaigrayevsky District

=== Chelyabinsk Oblast ===
As of 2010, one rural locality in Chelyabinsk Oblast bears this name:

- Krasny Yar, Chelyabinsk Oblast, a settlement in Varshavsky Selsoviet of Kartalinsky District

=== Chuvash Republic ===
As of 2010, one rural locality in the Chuvash Republic bears this name:

- Krasny Yar, Chuvash Republic, a village in Atnarskoye Rural Settlement of Krasnochetaysky District

=== Irkutsk Oblast ===
As of 2010, two rural localities in Irkutsk Oblast bear this name:

- Krasny Yar, Kuytunsky District, Irkutsk Oblast, a village in Kuytunsky District
- Krasny Yar, Ekhirit-Bulagatsky District, Irkutsk Oblast, a settlement in Ekhirit-Bulagatsky District

=== Kaliningrad Oblast ===
As of 2010, one rural locality in Kaliningrad Oblast bears this name:

- Krasny Yar, Kaliningrad Oblast, a settlement in Zorinsky Rural Okrug of Gvardeysky District

=== Kemerovo Oblast ===
As of 2010, one rural locality in Kemerovo Oblast bears this name:

- Krasny Yar, Kemerovo Oblast, a selo in Krasnoyarskaya Rural Territory of Izhmorsky District

=== Kirov Oblast ===
As of 2010, one rural locality in Kirov Oblast bears this name:

- Krasny Yar, Kirov Oblast, a settlement in Krasnoyarsky Rural Okrug of Nolinsky District

=== Krasnoyarsk Krai ===
As of 2010, two rural localities in Krasnoyarsk Krai bear this name:

- Krasny Yar, Abansky District, Krasnoyarsk Krai, a village in Ustyansky Selsoviet of Abansky District
- Krasny Yar, Kozulsky District, Krasnoyarsk Krai, a village in Balakhtonsky Selsoviet of Kozulsky District

=== Mari El Republic ===
As of 2010, one rural locality in the Mari El Republic bears this name:

- Krasny Yar, Mari El Republic, a selo in Krasnoyarsky Rural Okrug of Zvenigovsky District

=== Republic of Mordovia ===
As of 2010, two rural localities in the Republic of Mordovia bear this name:

- Krasny Yar, Kovylkinsky District, Republic of Mordovia, a settlement in Kochelayevsky Selsoviet of Kovylkinsky District
- Krasny Yar, Tengushevsky District, Republic of Mordovia, a village in Krasnoyarsky Selsoviet of Tengushevsky District

=== Nizhny Novgorod Oblast ===
As of 2010, three rural localities in Nizhny Novgorod Oblast bear this name:

- Krasny Yar, Krasnooktyabrsky District, Nizhny Novgorod Oblast, a village in Urazovsky Selsoviet of Krasnooktyabrsky District
- Krasny Yar, Urensky District, Nizhny Novgorod Oblast, a village in Semenovsky Selsoviet of Urensky District
- Krasny Yar, Voskresensky District, Nizhny Novgorod Oblast, a settlement in Glukhovsky Selsoviet of Voskresensky District

=== Novosibirsk Oblast ===
As of 2014, five rural localities in Novosibirsk Oblast bear this name:

- Krasny Yar, Barabinsky District, Novosibirsk Oblast, a village in Barabinsky District
- Krasny Yar, Kolyvansky District, Novosibirsk Oblast, a village in Kolyvansky District
- Krasny Yar, Novosibirsky District, Novosibirsk Oblast, a settlement in Novosibirsky District
- Krasny Yar, Ordynsky District, Novosibirsk Oblast, a selo in Ordynsky District
- Krasny Yar, Toguchinsky District, Novosibirsk Oblast, a settlement in Toguchinsky District

=== Omsk Oblast ===
As of 2010, four inhabited localities in Omsk Oblast bear this name.

Urban localities

- Krasny Yar, Lyubinsky District, Omsk Oblast, a work settlement in Lyubinsky District

Rural localities

- Krasny Yar, Bolsherechensky District, Omsk Oblast, a selo in Krasnoyarsky Rural Okrug of Bolsherechensky District
- Krasny Yar, Krutinsky District, Omsk Oblast, a village in Panovsky Rural Okrug of Krutinsky District
- Krasny Yar, Novovarshavsky District, Omsk Oblast, a village under the administrative jurisdiction of the work settlement of Novovarshavka, Novovarshavsky District

=== Orenburg Oblast ===
As of 2010, one rural locality in Orenburg Oblast bears this name:

- Krasny Yar, Orenburg Oblast, a selo in Krasnoyarsky Selsoviet of Ileksky District

=== Perm Krai ===
As of 2010, four rural localities in Perm Krai bear this name:

- Krasny Yar, Bolshesosnovsky District, Perm Krai, a village in Bolshesosnovsky District
- Krasny Yar, Gaynsky District, Perm Krai, a settlement in Gaynsky District
- Krasny Yar (rest home), Kishertsky District, Perm Krai, a rest home in Kishertsky District
- Krasny Yar (village), Kishertsky District, Perm Krai, a village in Kishertsky District

=== Primorsky Krai ===
As of 2010, two rural localities in Primorsky Krai bear this name:

- Krasny Yar, Ussuriysk, Primorsky Krai, a selo under the administrative jurisdiction of the Ussuriysk City Under Krai Jurisdiction
- Krasny Yar, Pozharsky District, Primorsky Krai, a selo in Pozharsky District

=== Rostov Oblast ===
As of 2010, two rural localities in Rostov Oblast bear this name:

- Krasny Yar, Kagalnitsky District, Rostov Oblast, a khutor in Rodnikovskoye Rural Settlement of Kagalnitsky District
- Krasny Yar, Kamensky District, Rostov Oblast, a khutor in Kalitvenskoye Rural Settlement of Kamensky District

=== Ryazan Oblast ===
As of 2010, two rural localities in Ryazan Oblast bear this name:

- Krasny Yar, Sasovsky District, Ryazan Oblast, a settlement in Polyaki-Maydanovsky Rural Okrug of Sasovsky District
- Krasny Yar, Spassky District, Ryazan Oblast, a settlement in Isadsky Rural Okrug of Spassky District

=== Samara Oblast ===
As of 2010, four rural localities in Samara Oblast bear this name:

- Krasny Yar, Kamyshlinsky District, Samara Oblast, a settlement in Kamyshlinsky District
- Krasny Yar, Krasnoyarsky District, Samara Oblast, a selo in Krasnoyarsky District
- Krasny Yar, Pestravsky District, Samara Oblast, a settlement in Pestravsky District
- Krasny Yar, Shentalinsky District, Samara Oblast, a settlement in Shentalinsky District

=== Saratov Oblast ===
As of 2010, three rural localities in Saratov Oblast bear this name:

- Krasny Yar, Arkadaksky District, Saratov Oblast, a selo in Arkadaksky District
- Krasny Yar, Balakovsky District, Saratov Oblast, a selo in Balakovsky District
- Krasny Yar, Engelssky District, Saratov Oblast, a selo in Engelssky District

=== Sverdlovsk Oblast ===
As of 2010, three rural localities in Sverdlovsk Oblast bear this name:

- Krasny Yar, Serov, Sverdlovsk Oblast, a settlement under the administrative jurisdiction of the Town of Serov
- Krasny Yar, Novolyalinsky District, Sverdlovsk Oblast, a settlement in Novolyalinsky District
- Krasny Yar, Slobodo-Turinsky District, Sverdlovsk Oblast, a village in Slobodo-Turinsky District

=== Republic of Tatarstan ===
As of 2010, seven rural localities in the Republic of Tatarstan bear this name:

- Krasny Yar, Cheremshansky District, Republic of Tatarstan, a selo in Cheremshansky District
- Krasny Yar, Chistopolsky District, Republic of Tatarstan, a selo in Chistopolsky District
- Krasny Yar (settlement), Muslyumovsky District, Republic of Tatarstan, a settlement in Muslyumovsky District
- Krasny Yar (village), Muslyumovsky District, Republic of Tatarstan, a village in Muslyumovsky District
- Krasny Yar, Rybno-Slobodsky District, Republic of Tatarstan, a village in Rybno-Slobodsky District
- Krasny Yar, Zainsky District, Republic of Tatarstan, a settlement in Zainsky District
- Krasny Yar, Zelenodolsky District, Republic of Tatarstan, a village in Zelenodolsky District

=== Tomsk Oblast ===
As of 2010, three rural localities in Tomsk Oblast bear this name:

- Krasny Yar, Kozhevnikovsky District, Tomsk Oblast, a village in Kozhevnikovsky District
- Krasny Yar, Krivosheinsky District, Tomsk Oblast, a selo in Krivosheinsky District
- Krasny Yar, Teguldetsky District, Tomsk Oblast, a settlement in Teguldetsky District

=== Tula Oblast ===
As of 2010, two rural localities in Tula Oblast bear this name:

- Krasny Yar, Kireyevsky District, Tula Oblast, a settlement in Krasnoyarsky Rural Okrug of Kireyevsky District
- Krasny Yar, Venyovsky District, Tula Oblast, a settlement in Vasilyevsky Rural Okrug of Venyovsky District

=== Tyumen Oblast ===
As of 2010, three rural localities in Tyumen Oblast bear this name:

- Krasny Yar, Nizhnetavdinsky District, Tyumen Oblast, a village in Iskinsky Rural Okrug of Nizhnetavdinsky District
- Krasny Yar, Uvatsky District, Tyumen Oblast, a selo in Krasnoyarsky Rural Okrug of Uvatsky District
- Krasny Yar, Yalutorovsky District, Tyumen Oblast, a village in Aslaninsky Rural Okrug of Yalutorovsky District

=== Udmurt Republic ===
As of 2010, three rural localities in the Udmurt Republic bear this name:

- Krasny Yar, Malopurginsky District, Udmurt Republic, a village in Noryinsky Selsoviet of Malopurginsky District
- Krasny Yar, Mozhginsky District, Udmurt Republic, a selo in Bolsheuchinsky Selsoviet of Mozhginsky District
- Krasny Yar, Syumsinsky District, Udmurt Republic, a village in Muki-Kaksinsky Selsoviet of Syumsinsky District

=== Ulyanovsk Oblast ===
As of 2010, one rural locality in Ulyanovsk Oblast bears this name:

- Krasny Yar, Ulyanovsk Oblast, a selo in Krasnoyarsky Rural Okrug of Cherdaklinsky District

=== Volgograd Oblast ===
As of 2010, two inhabited localities in Volgograd Oblast bear this name.

Urban localities

- Krasny Yar, Zhirnovsky District, Volgograd Oblast, a work settlement in Zhirnovsky District

Rural localities

- Krasny Yar, Staropoltavsky District, Volgograd Oblast, a selo in Krasnoyarsky Selsoviet of Staropoltavsky District

=== Yaroslavl Oblast ===
As of 2010, one rural locality in Yaroslavl Oblast bears this name:

- Krasny Yar, Yaroslavl Oblast, a settlement in Vasilyevsky Rural Okrug of Poshekhonsky District

=== Zabaykalsky Krai ===
As of 2010, one rural locality in Zabaykalsky Krai bears this name:

- Krasny Yar, Zabaykalsky Krai, a selo in Tungokochensky District

== Abolished localities ==
- Krasny Yar, Kuybyshevsky District, Novosibirsk Oblast, a village in Kuybyshevsky District of Novosibirsk Oblast; abolished in July 2014
