= Zelyony Bor =

Zelyony Bor (Russian: Зелёный Бор) is the name of several inhabited localities in Russia.

== Urban localities ==
- Zelyony Bor, Krasnoyarsk Krai, a work settlement under the administrative jurisdiction of the krai town of Minusinsk, Krasnoyarsk Krai

== Rural localities ==
- Zelyony Bor, Amur Oblast, a selo in Zelenoborsky Rural Settlement of Mikhaylovsky District of Amur Oblast
- Zelyony Bor, Severodvinsk, Arkhangelsk Oblast, a settlement under the administrative jurisdiction of the city of oblast significance of Severodvinsk, Arkhangelsk Oblast
- Zelyony Bor, Kargopolsky District, Arkhangelsk Oblast, a settlement in Pavlovsky Selsoviet of Kargopolsky District of Arkhangelsk Oblast
- Zelyony Bor, Velsky District, Arkhangelsk Oblast, a settlement in Ust-Velsky Selsoviet of Velsky District of Arkhangelsk Oblast
- Zelyony Bor, Ivanovo Oblast, a selo in Shuysky District of Ivanovo Oblast
- Zelyony Bor, Kaliningrad Oblast, a settlement in Svobodnensky Rural Okrug of Chernyakhovsky District of Kaliningrad Oblast
- Zelyony Bor, Novgorod Oblast, a village in Novorakhinskoye Settlement of Krestetsky District of Novgorod Oblast
- Zelyony Bor, Ryazan Oblast, a settlement under the administrative jurisdiction of the work settlement of Lesnoy in Shilovsky District of Ryazan Oblast
- Zelyony Bor, Verkhnyaya Pyshma, Sverdlovsk Oblast, a settlement under the administrative jurisdiction of the Town of Verkhnyaya Pyshma, Sverdlovsk Oblast
- Zelyony Bor, Yekaterinburg, Sverdlovsk Oblast, a settlement under the administrative jurisdiction of the City of Yekaterinburg, Sverdlovsk Oblast
- Zelyony Bor, Turinsky District, Sverdlovsk Oblast, a selo in Turinsky District, Sverdlovsk Oblast
- Zelyony Bor, Tambov Oblast, a settlement in Serpovsky Selsoviet of Morshansky District of Tambov Oblast
- Zelyony Bor, Tver Oblast, a settlement in Toropetsky District of Tver Oblast
- Zelyony Bor, Yaroslavl Oblast, a village in Vysokovsky Rural Okrug of Borisoglebsky District of Yaroslavl Oblast

== See also ==
- Zyalyony Bor
