= Yermakovsky =

Yermakovsky (Russian: Ермако́вский; masculine), Yermakovskaya (Ермако́вская; feminine), or Yermakovskoye (Ермако́вское; neuter) is the name of several rural localities in Russia:

- Yermakovsky, Novosibirsk Oblast, a settlement in Kochkovsky District of Novosibirsk Oblast
- Yermakovsky, name of several other rural localities
- Yermakovskaya, a stanitsa in Tatsinsky District of Rostov Oblast
- Yermakovskoye, a selo in Yermakovsky District of Krasnoyarsk Krai
- Yermakovsky District, a district in Russia
- Yermakovsky mine, a mine in Russia
