= Platovo =

Platovo (Russian: Платово) is the name of several rural localities Russia:

- Platovo, Sovetsky District, Altai Krai, a selo in Sovetsky District, Altai Krai
- Platovo, Amur Oblast, a selo in Zavitinsky District, Amur Oblast
