= Novogeorgiyevka =

Novogeorgiyevka (Russian: Новогеоргиевка) is the name of several rural localities in Russia:

- Novogeorgiyevka, Mikhaylovsky District, Amur Oblast, a selo in Mikhaylovsky Selsoviet of Mikhaylovsky District, Amur Oblast
- Novogeorgiyevka, Shimanovsky District, Amur Oblast, a selo in Novogeorgiyevsky Selsoviet of Oktyabrsky District, Amur Oblast
