= Poyarkovo =

Name of several Russian rural localities

Poyarkovo (Russian: Поярково) is the name of several rural localities in Russia:

- Poyarkovo, Amur Oblast, a selo in Poyarkovsky Rural Settlement of Mikhaylovsky District of Amur Oblast
- Poyarkovo, Kostroma Oblast, a village in Palkinskoye Settlement of Antropovsky District of Kostroma Oblast
- Poyarkovo, Moscow Oblast, a village in Lunevskoye Rural Settlement of Solnechnogorsky District of Moscow Oblast
- Poyarkovo, Pskov Oblast, a village in Pytalovsky District of Pskov Oblast
- Poyarkovo, Ryazan Oblast, a village in Poyarkovsky Rural Okrug of Mikhaylovsky District of Ryazan Oblast
