= Nizhnaya Ilyinovka =

Nizhnaya Ilyinovka Нижняя Ильиновка
- Selo
- Location within Amur Oblast Location within Russia
- Coordinates: 49°54′N 128°32′E
- Country: Russia
- Region: Amur Oblast
- District: Mikhaylovsky District
- Time zone: UTC+9:00

Nizhnaya Ilyinovka (Russian: Нижняя Ильиновка) is a rural locality (a selo) and the administrative center of Nizhneilyinovsky Selsoviet of Mikhaylovsky District, Amur Oblast, Russia. The population was 283 as of 2018. There are 6 streets.

== Geography ==
Nizhnaya Ilyinovka is located on the left bank of the Dim River, 44 km north of Poyarkovo (the district's administrative centre) by road. Yaroslavka is the nearest rural locality.
