= Arsentyevka =

Arsentyevka Арсентьевка
- Selo
- Location within Amur Oblast Location within Russia
- Coordinates: 49°59′N 128°52′E
- Country: Russia
- Region: Amur Oblast
- District: Mikhaylovsky District
- Time zone: UTC+9:00

Arsentyevka (Russian: Арсентьевка) is a rural locality (a selo) in Mikhaylovsky Selsoviet of Mikhaylovsky District, Amur Oblast, Russia. The population was 186 as of 2018. There are 3 streets.

== Geography ==
Arsentyevka is located on the right left bank of the Zavitaya River, 57 km north of Poyarkovo (the district's administrative centre) by road. Petropavlovka is the nearest rural locality.
