= Shushensky =

Shushensky (masculine), Shushenskaya (feminine), or Shushenskoye (neuter) may refer to:

- Shushensky District, a district of Krasnoyarsk Krai, Russia
- Shushenskoye, an urban-type settlement in Krasnoyarsk Krai, Russia
