= Aktay, Amur Oblast =

Aktay Актай
- Selo
- Location within Amur Oblast Location within Russia
- Coordinates: 51°44′N 127°14′E
- Country: Russia
- Region: Amur Oblast
- District: Shimanovsky District
- Time zone: UTC+9:00

Aktay (Russian: Актай) is a rural locality (a selo) in Novogeorgiyevsky Selsoviet of Shimanovsky District, Amur Oblast, Russia. The population was 126 as of 2018. There is 1 street.

== Geography ==
Aktay is located 57 km southwest of Shimanovsk (the district's administrative centre) by road. Novogeorgiyevka is the nearest rural locality.
