= Vinnikovo =

Vinnikovo Винниково
- Selo
- Location within Amur Oblast Location within Russia
- Coordinates: 49°32′N 129°17′E
- Country: Russia
- Region: Amur Oblast
- District: Mikhaylovsky District
- Time zone: UTC+9:00

Vinnikovo (Russian: Винниково) is a rural locality (a selo) in Kalininsky Selsoviet of Mikhaylovsky District, Amur Oblast, Russia. The population was 177 as of 2018. There are 8 streets.

== Geography ==
Vinnikovo is located on the right left bank of the Raychikha River, 91 km east of Poyarkovo (the district's administrative centre) by road. Uspenovka is the nearest rural locality.
