= Karatuzsky =

Karatuzsky (masculine), Karatuzskaya (feminine), or Karatuzskoye (neuter) may refer to:

- Karatuzsky District, a district in Krasnoyarsk Krai, Russia
- Karatuzskoye, a rural locality (a selo) in Krasnoyarsk Krai, Russia
