= Krasny Vostok =

Krasny Vostok Красный Восток
- Selo
- Location within Amur Oblast Location within Russia
- Coordinates: 49°43′N 128°35′E
- Country: Russia
- Region: Amur Oblast
- District: Mikhaylovsky District
- Time zone: UTC+9:00

Krasny Vostok (Russian: Красный Восток) is a rural locality (a selo) in Korshunovsky Selsoviet of Mikhaylovsky District, Amur Oblast, Russia. The population was 81 as of 2018. There are 2 streets.

== Geography ==
Krasny Vostok is located on the right bank of the Zavitaya River, 15 km north of Poyarkovo (the district's administrative centre) by road. Cheremisino is the nearest rural locality.
