= Zabalocki rural council =

Subdivision of Smalyavichy district, Belarus

Zabalocki rural council is a lower-level subdivision (selsoviet) of Smalyavichy district, Minsk region, Belarus.
