= Urozhaynoye, Altai Krai =

Urozhaynoye Урожайное
- Selo
- Location within Altai Krai Location within Russia
- Coordinates: 52°18′N 85°38′E
- Country: Russia
- Region: Altai Krai
- District: Sovetsky District
- Time zone: UTC+7:00

Urozhaynoye (Russian: Урожайное) is a rural locality (a selo) and the administrative center of Urozhayny Selsoviet, Sovetsky District, Altai Krai, Russia. The population was 1,178 as of 2013. There are 14 streets.

== Geography ==
Urozhaynoye is located 18 km east of Sovetskoye (the district's administrative centre) by road. Lebediny is the nearest rural locality.
