= Zhodzinski rural council =

Subdivision of Smalyavichy district, Belarus

Zhodzinski rural council is a lower-level subdivision (selsoviet) of Smalyavichy district, Minsk region, Belarus.
