= Petrushi (selo), Amur Oblast =

Petrushi Петруши
- Selo
- Location within Amur Oblast Location within Russia
- Coordinates: 52°03′N 127°39′E
- Country: Russia
- Region: Amur Oblast
- District: Shimanovsky District
- Time zone: UTC+9:00

Petrushi (Russian: Петруши) is a rural locality (a selo) and the administrative center of Petrushinsky Selsoviet of Shimanovsky District, Amur Oblast, Russia. The population was 404 as of 2018. There are 3 streets.

== Geography ==
Petrushi is located 10 km north of Shimanovsk (the district's administrative centre) by road. Shimanovsk is the nearest rural locality.
