= Petrushi =

Petrushi (Russian: Петруши) is the name of several rural localities in Russia:

- Petrushi (selo), Amur Oblast, a selo in Petrushinsky Selsoviet of Shimanovsky District, Amur Oblast
- Petrushi (station), Amur Oblast, a station in Petrushinsky Selsoviet of Shimanovsky District, Amur Oblast
