= Coleophora sibirica =

Scientific classification
- Kingdom: Animalia
- Phylum: Arthropoda
- Class: Insecta
- Order: Lepidoptera
- Family: Coleophoridae
- Genus: Coleophora
- Species: C. sibirica

Binomial name
- Coleophora sibirica Filepjev, 1924

Species of moth

Coleophora sibirica is a moth of the family Coleophoridae. It is found in Russia (Minusinsk, Baikal).
