= Krasny Yar, Sovetsky District, Altai Krai =

Krasny Yar Красный Яр
- Village
- Location within Altai Krai Location within Russia
- Coordinates: 52°21′N 85°20′E
- Country: Russia
- Region: Altai Krai
- District: Sovetsky District
- Time zone: UTC+7:00

Krasny Yar (Russian: Красный Яр) is a rural locality (a selo) and the administrative center of Krasnoyarsky Selsoviet of Sovetsky District, Altai Krai, Russia. The population was 1,203 in 2016. There are 19 streets.

== Geography ==
Krasny Yar is located 10 km north of Sovetskoye (the district's administrative centre) by road. Sovetskoye is the nearest rural locality.
