= Zyalyony Bor =

Zyalyony Bor (Belarusian: Зялёны Бор; Russian: Зелёный Бор, romanized: Zelyony Bor) may refer to the following places in Belarus:

- Zyalyony Bor, Brest Region, a settlement in Ivatsevichy District, Brest Region
- Zyalyony Bor, Gomel Region, a village in Yelʹsk District, Gomel Region
- Zyalyony Bor, Grodno Region, a village in Ashmyany District, Grodno Region
- Zyalyony Bor, Smalyavichy District, an urban-type settlement in Smalyavichy District, Minsk Region
- Zyalyony Bor, Salihorsk District, a village in Salihorsk District, Minsk Region
- Zyalyony Bor, Vitebsk Region, a village in Talachyn District, Vitebsk Region

== See also ==
- Zelyony Bor
