= Novogeorgiyevka, Shimanovsky District, Amur Oblast =

Novogeorgiyevka Новогеоргиевка
- Selo
- Location within Amur Oblast Location within Russia
- Coordinates: 51°51′N 127°06′E
- Country: Russia
- Region: Amur Oblast
- District: Shimanovsky District
- Time zone: UTC+9:00

Novogeorgiyevka (Russian: Новогеоргиевка) is a rural locality (a selo) and the administrative center of Novogeorgiyevsky Selsoviet of Shimanovsky District, Amur Oblast, Russia. The population was 435 as of 2018. There are 10 streets.

== Geography ==
Novogeorgiyevka is located on the Bereya River, 46 km southwest of Shimanovsk (the district's administrative centre) by road. Svobodny Trud and Saskal are the nearest rural localities.
