= Pliski rural council =

Pliski rural council is a lower-level subdivision (selsoviet) of Smalyavichy district, Minsk region, Belarus.
