= Svetloye Ozero =

Svetloye Ozero may refer to:

- Svetloye Ozero, Zainsky District, Republic of Tatarstan, a village (selo) in Zainsky District of the Republic of Tatarstan, Russia
- Svetloye Ozero, Nurlatsky District, Republic of Tatarstan, a village in Nurlatsky District of the Republic of Tatarstan, Russia
- Ozero Svetloye (Russian Swan Lake) (also known as "Svetloe Lake"), a lake on Altai Krai region (Russia), south of Urozhaynoye, best known as winter non-frozen lake with Whooper swan presence (see commons:Category:Lake Svetloye (Altai Krai)).
