= Krasny Yar, Amur Oblast =

Krasny Yar Красный Яр
- Selo
- Location within Amur Oblast Location within Russia
- Coordinates: 49°50′N 128°44′E
- Country: Russia
- Region: Amur Oblast
- District: Mikhaylovsky District
- Time zone: UTC+9:00

Krasny Yar (Russian: Красный Яр) is a rural locality (a selo) in Zelenoborsky Selsoviet of Mikhaylovsky District, Amur Oblast, Russia. The population was 131 as of 2018. There are 3 streets.

== Geography ==
Krasny Yar is located on the left bank of the Zavitaya River, 30 km north of Poyarkovo (the district's administrative centre) by road. Nizhnezavitinka is the nearest rural locality.
