= Platovo, Sovetsky District, Altai Krai =

Platovo Платово
- Village
- Location within Altai Krai Location within Russia
- Coordinates: 52°04′N 85°54′E
- Country: Russia
- Region: Altai Krai
- District: Sovetsky District
- Time zone: UTC+7:00

Platovo (Russian: Платово) is a rural locality (a selo) and the administrative center of Platovsky Selsoviet, Sovetsky District, Altai Krai, Russia. The population was 691 in 2016. There are 5 streets.

== Geography ==
Platovo is located on the left bank of the Katun River, 57 km southeast of Sovetskoye (the district's administrative centre) by road. Podgornoye is the nearest rural locality.
