= Zelyony Bor, Amur Oblast =

Zelyony Bor Зелёный Бор
- Selo
- Location within Amur Oblast Location within Russia
- Coordinates: 49°41′N 128°38′E
- Country: Russia
- Region: Amur Oblast
- District: Mikhaylovsky District
- Time zone: UTC+9:00

Zelyony Bor (Russian: Зелёный Бор) is a rural locality (a selo) and the administrative center of Zelenoborsky Selsoviet of Mikhaylovsky District, Amur Oblast, Russia. The population was 523 as of 2018. There are 9 streets.

== Geography ==
Zelyony Bor is located 9 km north of Poyarkovo (the district's administrative centre) by road. Krasny Vostok is the nearest rural locality.
