= Novogeorgiyevka, Mikhaylovsky District, Amur Oblast =

Novogeorgiyevka Новогеоргиевка
- Selo
- Location within Amur Oblast Location within Russia
- Coordinates: 49°53′N 128°46′E
- Country: Russia
- Region: Amur Oblast
- District: Mikhaylovsky District
- Time zone: UTC+9:00

Novogeorgiyevka (Russian: Новогеоргиевка) is a rural locality (a selo) in Mikhaylovsky Selsoviet of Mikhaylovsky District, Amur Oblast, Russia. The population was 26 as of 2018. There is 1 street.

== Geography ==
Novogeorgiyevka is located on the right bank of the Zavitaya River, 59 km north of Poyarkovo (the district's administrative centre) by road. Mikhaylovka is the nearest rural locality.
