= Minusinsk Uprising =

Russian Civil War

- Part of Eastern Front of the Russian Civil War
| Date | November 9 – December 7, 1918 |
| Location | Minusinsk, Krasnoyarsk Krai, Russia |
| Result | Rebellion suppressed |

Belligerents
| Peasant rebels | White Army |

Commanders and leaders
| V. Oschepkov | I. F. Shilnikov |

Strength
| 10,000 (8,000 unarmed) | 3,000 |

The Minusinsk Uprising was a peasant uprising in November 1918 around Minusinsk, in the Krasnoyarsk Krai province, against the policy of extortion, forcible mobilization into the Siberian Army and repression by the White Guards.

== History ==
The rebellion began on November 9, 1918 with the defeat of a punitive White detachment in the village of Dubenskoe. On November 11, the rebels captured the Cossack village of Karace. In mid-November they created a unified leadership and launched an attack on Minusinsk to defeat the punitive detachment of General Shilnikov there and establish Soviet power. On November 19, 7 detachments (about 10.000 people) under command of the Chief of the General Staff, V. Oshchepkov (a Corporal in the Tsarist army), attacked Minusinsk from three sides. However, the detachment of Shilnikov (about 3.000 soldiers) managed to repulse the persistent attacks of the rebels between 19 – 21 of November. On November 27, the uprising was suppressed, and fights against individual detachments lasted until December 7..

The defeat of the rebellion was due to poor armament (no artillery, only 2,000 rifles and a small number of cartridges) and inconsistent actions by the rebel detachments. The White military field court dealt brutally with the rebels: 87 people were shot, 50 forced into servitude, about 200 sentenced to imprisonment, and some 300 to a large fine. The main mass of surviving rebels went to the woods and continued a guerrilla struggle from there.
