= Kangulovo =

Kangulovo Кангулово
- Village
- Location within Bashkortostan Location within Russia
- Coordinates: 56°01′N 54°28′E
- Country: Russia
- Region: Bashkortostan
- District: Kaltasinsky District
- Time zone: UTC+5:00

Kangulovo (Russian: Кангулово; Bashkir: Ҡанғол, Qanğol) is a rural locality (a village) in Amzibashevsky Selsoviet, Kaltasinsky District, Bashkortostan, Russia. The population was 14 as of 2010. There are 6 streets.

== Geography ==
Kangulovo is located 28 km northwest of Kaltasy (the district's administrative centre) by road. Krasny Yar is the nearest rural locality.
