= Minusinsky District =

Minusinsky District Минусинский район (Russian)
- District
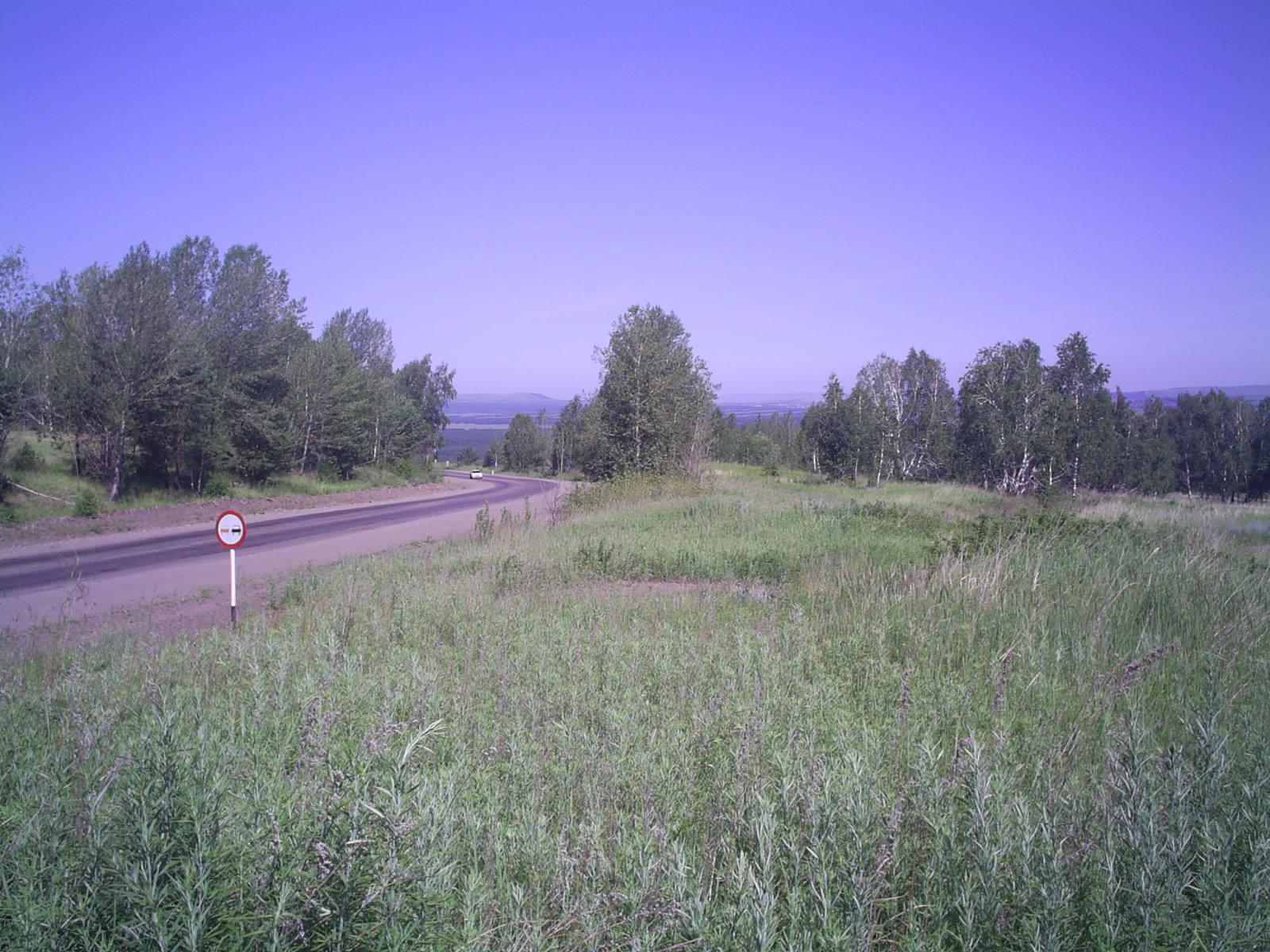
- M54 Highway near Znamenka in Minusinsky District

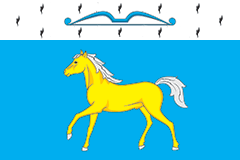
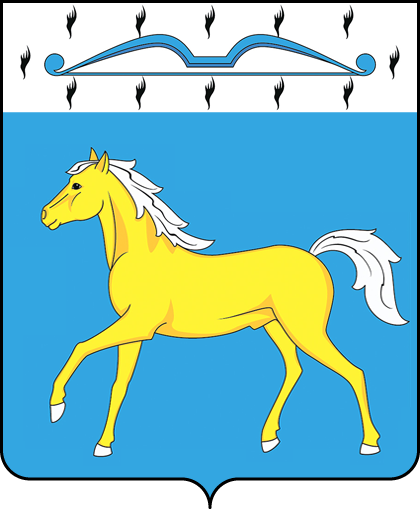
- Flag Coat of arms
- Location of Minusinsky District in Krasnoyarsk Krai
- Coordinates: 53°42′N 91°41′E
- Country: Russia
- Federal subject: Krasnoyarsk Krai
- Established: April 4, 1924
- Administrative center: Minusinsk

Government
  - Type: Local government
  - Body: Minusinsky District Council of Deputies
  - Head: Alexander P. Shakhov

Area
  - Total: 3,185 km^{2} (1,230 sq mi)

Population (2010 Census)
  - Total: 25,872
  - Density: 8.123/km^{2} (21.04/sq mi)
  - Urban: 0%
  - Rural: 100%

Administrative structure
  - Administrative divisions: 13 selsoviet
  - Inhabited localities: 39 rural localities

Municipal structure
  - Municipally incorporated as: Minusinsky Municipal District
  - Municipal divisions: 0 urban settlements, 13 rural settlements
- Time zone: UTC+7 (MSK+4)
- OKTMO ID: 04633000
- Website: http://www.amr24.ru

Population of Minusinsky District
- 2010 Census: 25,872
- 2002 Census: 26,729
- 1989 Census: 25,803
- 1979 Census: 24,184

Minusinsky District (Russian: Минуси́нский райо́н) is an administrative and municipal district (raion), one of the forty-three in Krasnoyarsk Krai, Russia. It is located in the southwest of the krai and borders with Krasnoturansky District in the north, Kuraginsky District in the east, Karatuzsky District in the southeast, Shushensky District in the south, and with the Republic of Khakassia in the west. The area of the district is 3,185 square kilometers (1,230 sq mi). Its administrative center is the town of Minusinsk (which is not administratively a part of the district). As of the 2010 Census, the total population of the district was 25,872.

== Geography ==
The district is situated on the Yenisey River in the central part of the Minusinsk Hollow.

== History ==
The district was founded on April 4, 1924.

== Administrative and municipal status ==
Within the framework of administrative divisions, Minusinsky District is one of the forty-three in the krai. The town of Minusinsk serves as its administrative center, despite being incorporated separately as a krai town—an administrative unit with the status equal to that of the districts. The district is divided into thirteen selsoviets.

As a municipal division, the district is incorporated as Minusinsky Municipal District and is divided into thirteen rural settlements (corresponding to the administrative district's selsoviets). The krai town of Minusinsk is incorporated separately from the district as Minusinsk Urban Okrug.

== Economy ==
=== Transportation ===
The Abakan-Tayshet railway runs through the district. A part of the federal highway M54 passes through the district as well.
