= Shimanovsk Airport =

Shimanovsk
- IATA: none; ICAO: none

Summary
- Airport type: Public
- Location: Shimanovsk
- Elevation AMSL: 869 ft / 265 m
- Coordinates: 51°59′6″N 127°38′36″E
- Interactive map of Shimanovsk

Runways
Direction	Length		Surface
Direction	ft	m	Surface
	4,757	1,450	Concrete

Shimanovsk Airport is an airport in Russia located 4 km southwest of Shimanovsk, Amur Oblast. It primarily services general aviation and is a minor facility.

== See also ==
- List of airports in Russia
