= Zelyony Bor, Kargopolsky District, Arkhangelsk Oblast =

Zelyony Bor Зелёный Бор
- Settlement
- Location within Arkhangelsk Oblast Location within Russia
- Coordinates: 61°33′N 38°57′E
- Country: Russia
- Region: Arkhangelsk Oblast
- District: Kargopolsky District
- Time zone: UTC+3:00

Zelyony Bor (Russian: Зелёный Бор) is a rural locality (a settlement) in Kargopolsky District, Arkhangelsk Oblast, Russia. The population was 153 as of 2012. There are 2 streets.

== Geography ==
Zelyony Bor is located 6 km north of Kargopol (the district's administrative centre) by road. Pogost is the nearest rural locality.
