= Yermakovsky District =

Yermakovsky District Ермаковский район (Russian)
- District
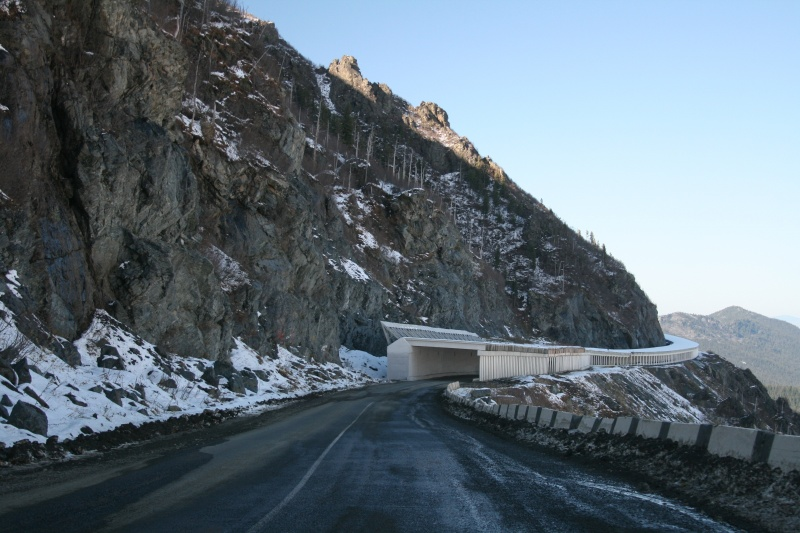
- Buybinsky Pass in the Sayan Mountains, Yermakovsky District

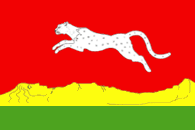
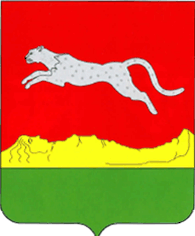
- Flag Coat of arms
- Location of Yermakovsky District in Krasnoyarsk Krai
- Coordinates: 53°16′16″N 92°23′50″E
- Country: Russia
- Federal subject: Krasnoyarsk Krai
- Established: May 25, 1925
- Administrative center: Yermakovskoye

Government
  - Type: Local government
  - Body: Yermakovsky District Council of Deputies
  - Head: Mikhail A. Vigovsky

Area
  - Total: 17,652 km^{2} (6,815 sq mi)

Population (2010 Census)
  - Total: 20,918
  - Density: 1.1850/km^{2} (3.0692/sq mi)
  - Urban: 0%
  - Rural: 100%

Administrative structure
  - Administrative divisions: 14 selsoviet
  - Inhabited localities: 28 rural localities

Municipal structure
  - Municipally incorporated as: Yermakovsky Municipal District
  - Municipal divisions: 0 urban settlements, 14 rural settlements
- Time zone: UTC+7 (MSK+4)
- OKTMO ID: 04616000
- Website: http://www.adminerm.ru

Yermakovsky District (Russian: Ермако́вский райо́н) is an administrative and municipal district (raion), one of the forty-three in Krasnoyarsk Krai, Russia. It is located in the south of the krai and borders with Karatuzsky District in the northeast, the Tuva Republic in the east and south, and with Shushensky District in the west and northwest. The area of the district is 17,652 square kilometers (6,815 sq mi). Its administrative center is the rural locality (a selo) of Yermakovskoye. Population: 20,918 (2010 census); 23,202 (2002 Census); 23,043 (1989 Soviet census). The population of Yermakovskoye accounts for 40.9% of the district's total population.

== Geography ==
Most of the district's territory is located in the center of the Western Sayan Mountains.

== History ==
The district was founded on May 25, 1925.

== Government ==
As of 2015, the Head of the District is Mikhail A. Vigovsky. As of 2016, the District Council consists of twenty-one deputies.
