= Krasny Yar, Gaynsky District, Perm Krai =

Krasny Yar Красный Яр
- Settlement
- Location within Perm Krai Location within Russia
- Coordinates: 60°03′N 54°01′E
- Country: Russia
- Region: Perm Krai
- District: Gaynsky District
- Time zone: UTC+5:00

Krasny Yar (Russian: Красный Яр) is a rural locality (a settlement) in Ivanchinskoye Rural Settlement, Gaynsky District, Perm Krai, Russia. The population was 158 as of 2010. There are 4 streets.

== Geography ==
Krasny Yar is located 46 km southwest of Gayny (the district's administrative centre) by road. Krasnoyary is the nearest rural locality.
