= Minusinsk =

Town in Krasnoyarsk Krai, Russia

Minusinsk Минусинск
- Town
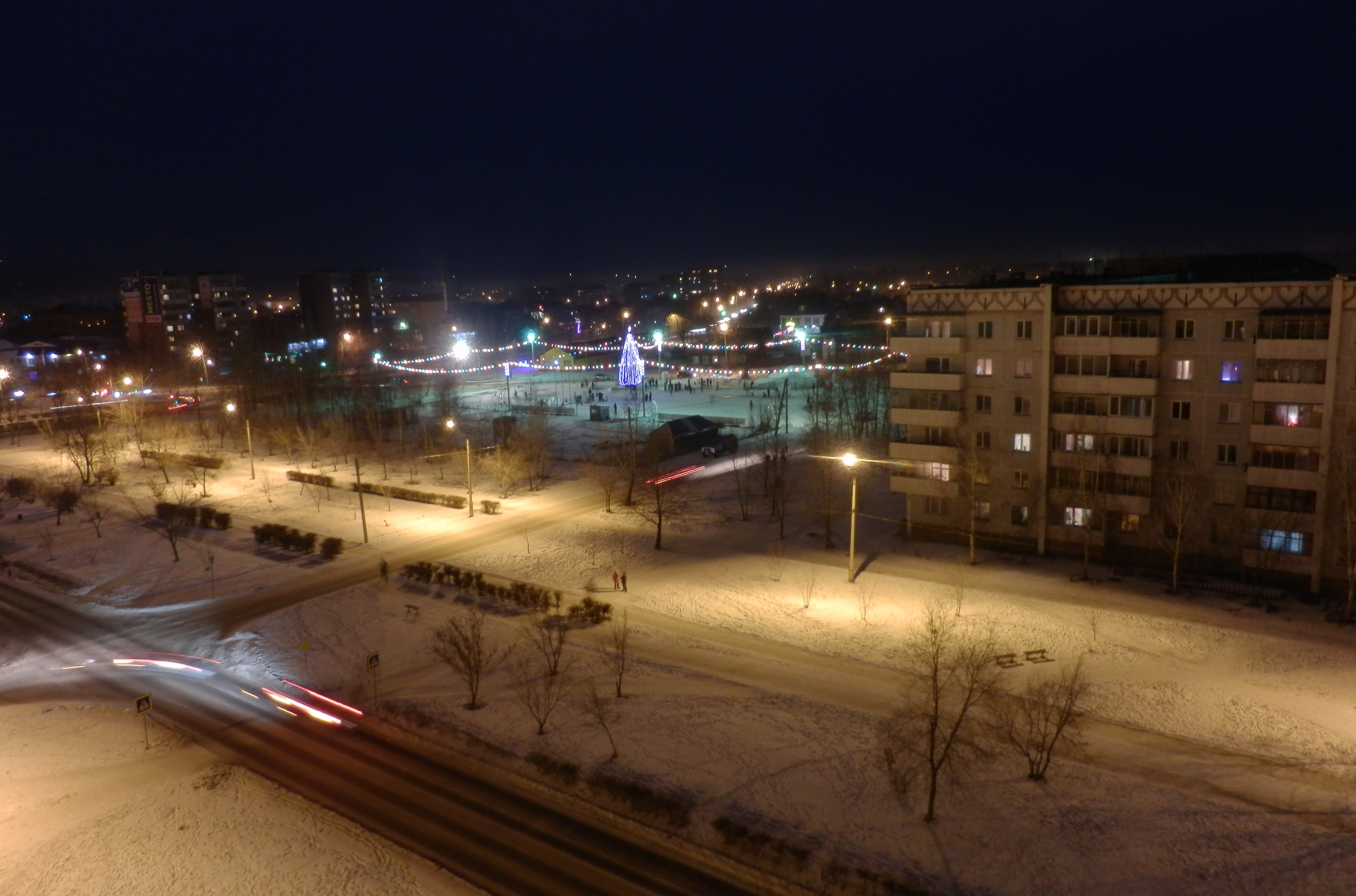

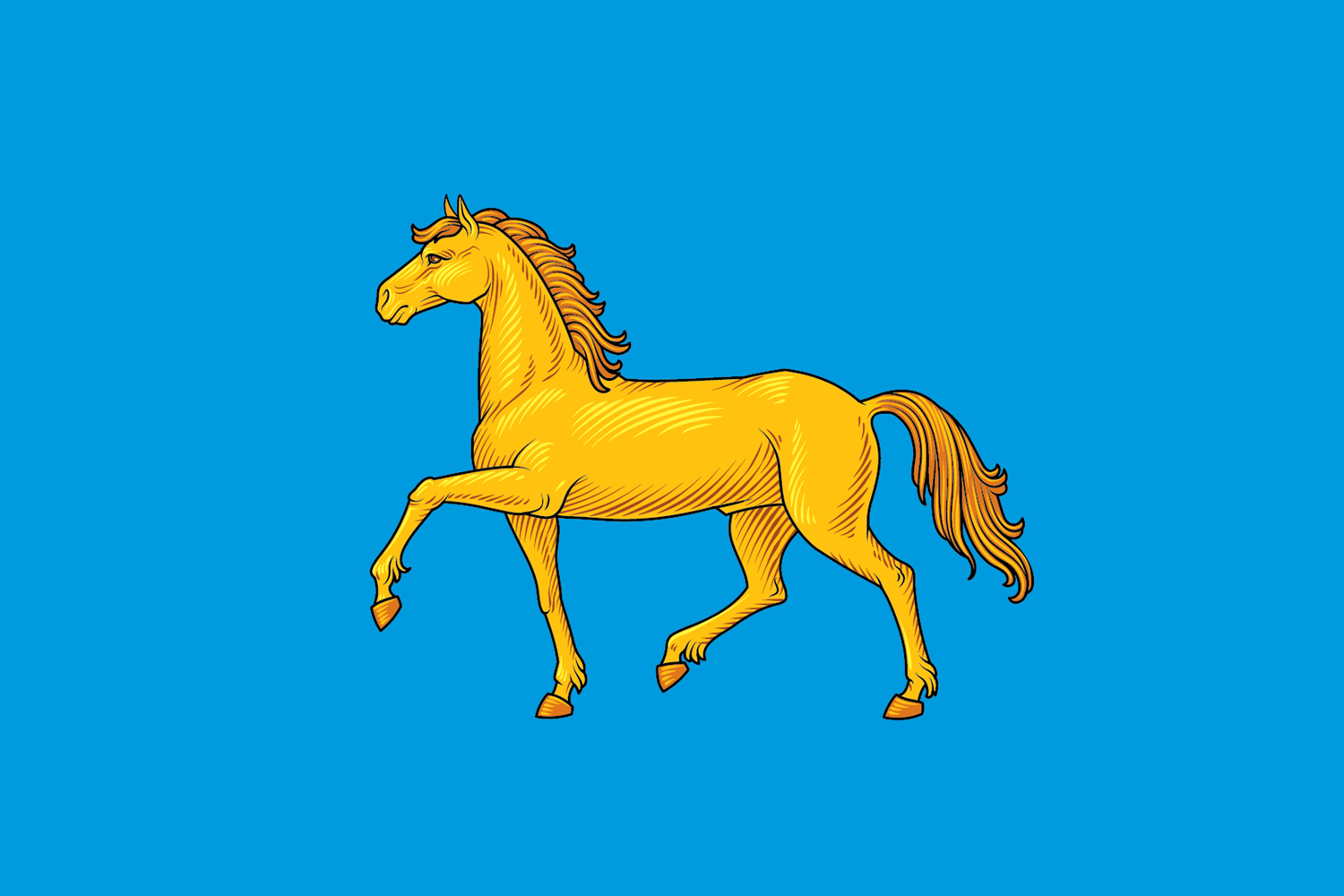
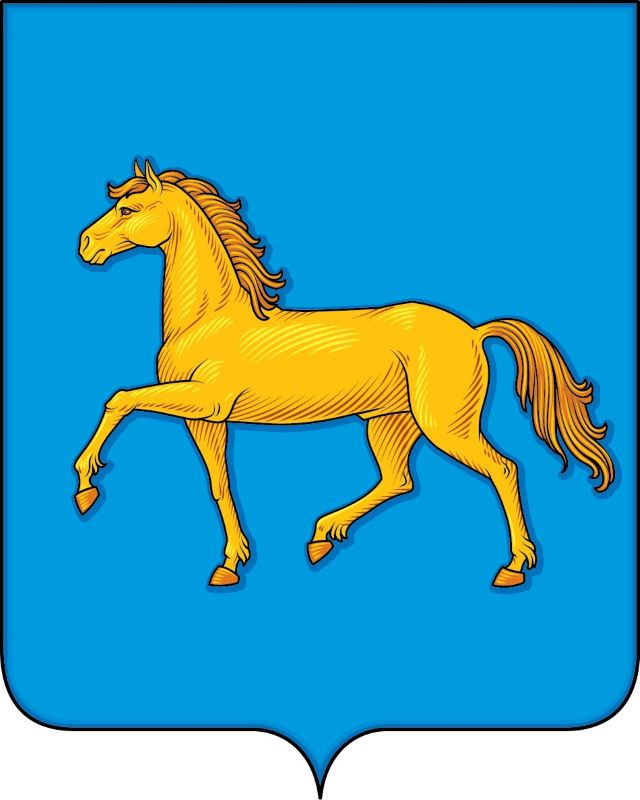
- Flag Coat of arms
- Interactive map of Minusinsk
- Location of Minusinsk Minusinsk (Krasnoyarsk Krai)
- Coordinates: 53°42′N 91°41′E
- Country: Russia
- Federal subject: Krasnoyarsk Krai
- Founded: 1739
- Town status since: 1822
- Elevation: 250 m (820 ft)

Population (2010 Census)
  - Total: 71,170
  - Estimate (2025): 68,034 (−4.4%)
  - Rank: 220th in 2010

Administrative status
  - Subordinated to: krai town of Minusinsk
  - Capital of: krai town of Minusinsk, Minusinsky District

Municipal status
  - Urban okrug: Minusinsk Urban Okrug
  - Capital of: Minusinsk Urban Okrug, Minusinsky Municipal District
- Time zone: UTC+7 (MSK+4)
- Postal code: 662600
- Dialing code: +7 39132
- OKTMO ID: 04723000001
- Website: minusinsk.info

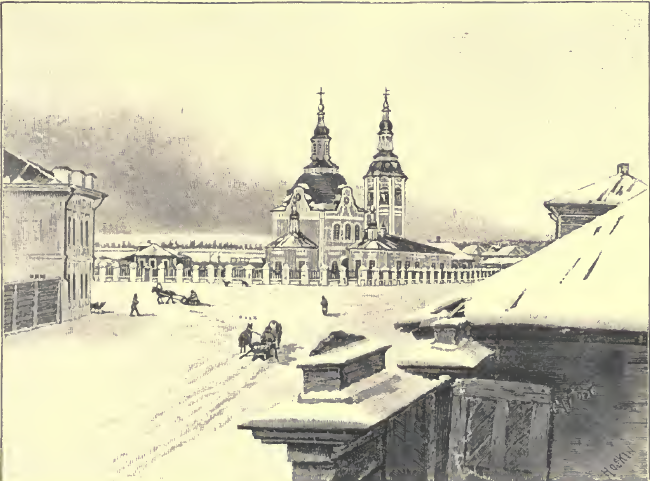
Minusinsk, 1885

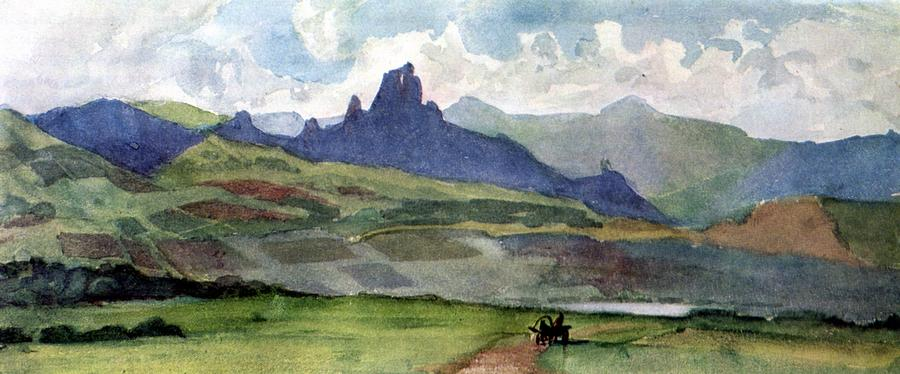
Minusinsk Steppe, by Vasily Surikov

Minusinsk (Russian: Минуси́нск; Khakas: Минсуғ, romanized: Minsuğ) is a historical town in Krasnoyarsk Krai, Russia. Population: 71,170 (2010 census); 72,561 (2002 census); 72,942 (1989 Soviet census); 44,500 (1973).

== History ==
"About 330-200 B.C. the iron age triumphed at Minusinsk, producing spiked axes, partly bronze and partly iron, and a group of large collective burial places." Greco-Roman funerary masks, like those found at Pazyryk, make up the "Minusinsk group: at Trifonova, Bateni, Beya, Kali, Znamenka, etc." "The Indo-European aristocracy with its Sarmatian connections was succeeded at Minusinsk by the Kirghiz after the third century A.D."

The Russian settlement of Minyusinskoye (Минюсинское) was founded in 1739-1740 at the confluence of the Minusa River with the Yenisei. The Turkic Min Usa means "my brook", or "thousand rivers". The name transformed to Minusinskoye (Минусинское) in 1810.

By 1822, Minusinsk had emerged as a regional center of farming and transit trade and was granted town status. During the 19th century, it was a node of cultural activities for a large area. The Martyanov Natural History Museum was opened there in 1877. It remains active and publishes a useful annual report of its scientific findings, meetings, etc.

The town was also a place of political exile. George Kennan wrote in his very influential book Siberia and the Exile System (NY 1891) of the town and the museum being an intellectual haven for those tsarist political activists and revolutionaries who had been exiled from European Russia in the 1880s. Vladimir Lenin used to visit Minusinsk on numerous occasions when he was in exile in the nearby village of Shushenskoye between 1897 and 1900.

In November 1918, during the Russian Civil War, Minusinsk peasants started a short-lived rebellion against the White Army because of extortion and high taxes. However, poor equipment and supplies led to eventual defeat in the December, and the rebels were subjected to execution, exile, prison or fines.

A memorial to those who were executed or died in prison in the 1930s to 1950s was erected in 1992. A monument was added in 2005 in the old cemetery to deported Poles buried there in the 1940s.

== Administrative and municipal status ==
Within the framework of administrative divisions, Minusinsk serves as the administrative center of Minusinsky District, even though it is not a part of it. As an administrative division, it is, together with the urban-type settlement of Zelyony Bor, incorporated separately as the krai town of Minusinsk—an administrative unit with the status equal to that of the districts. As a municipal division, the krai town of Minusinsk is incorporated as Minusinsk Urban Okrug.

== Geography ==
Minusinsk marks the center of the Minusinsk Hollow, one of the most important archaeological areas north of Pazyryk. It is associated with the Afanasevo, Tashtyk, and Tagar cultures—all of them named after settlements in the vicinity of Minusinsk.

=== Climate ===
Minusinsk has a humid continental climate (Köppen climate classification Dfb/Dwb), with very cold winters and warm summers. Precipitation is quite low, but is much higher from June to September than at other times of the year.

Climate data for Minusinsk
Month	Jan	Feb	Mar	Apr	May	Jun	Jul	Aug	Sep	Oct	Nov	Dec	Year
Record high °C (°F)	6.7 (44.1)	10.3 (50.5)	24.2 (75.6)	33.0 (91.4)	37.7 (99.9)	38.2 (100.8)	39.3 (102.7)	37.7 (99.9)	35.5 (95.9)	25.8 (78.4)	16.1 (61.0)	7.0 (44.6)	39.3 (102.7)
Mean daily maximum °C (°F)	−11.5 (11.3)	−7.1 (19.2)	2.4 (36.3)	12.8 (55.0)	20.0 (68.0)	25.7 (78.3)	27.3 (81.1)	24.9 (76.8)	17.6 (63.7)	9.1 (48.4)	−1.5 (29.3)	−9.0 (15.8)	9.2 (48.6)
Daily mean °C (°F)	−17.8 (0.0)	−14.9 (5.2)	−5.0 (23.0)	5.0 (41.0)	11.7 (53.1)	18.0 (64.4)	20.2 (68.4)	17.3 (63.1)	10.1 (50.2)	2.6 (36.7)	−6.4 (20.5)	−14.2 (6.4)	2.2 (36.0)
Mean daily minimum °C (°F)	−23.3 (−9.9)	−21.2 (−6.2)	−11.6 (11.1)	−1.9 (28.6)	3.8 (38.8)	10.6 (51.1)	13.5 (56.3)	10.7 (51.3)	4.0 (39.2)	−2.4 (27.7)	−10.9 (12.4)	−19.3 (−2.7)	−4.0 (24.8)
Record low °C (°F)	−52.2 (−62.0)	−50.3 (−58.5)	−46.7 (−52.1)	−32.3 (−26.1)	−10.9 (12.4)	−3.5 (25.7)	2.6 (36.7)	−2.8 (27.0)	−11.5 (11.3)	−24.0 (−11.2)	−42.9 (−45.2)	−49.4 (−56.9)	−52.2 (−62.0)
Average precipitation mm (inches)	8 (0.3)	7 (0.3)	9 (0.4)	18 (0.7)	34 (1.3)	66 (2.6)	69 (2.7)	68 (2.7)	49 (1.9)	25 (1.0)	16 (0.6)	11 (0.4)	380 (14.9)
Average precipitation days (≥ 0.1 mm)	11.7	7.6	7.4	11.0	10.0	10.7	12.7	12.1	10.0	12.7	11.3	14.8	132
Average relative humidity (%)	79.5	74.9	70.5	60.6	56.5	64.4	71.2	71.9	69.1	75.6	73.4	76.9	70.4
Mean monthly sunshine hours	74.4	96.7	189.1	216.0	254.2	276.0	272.8	232.5	165.0	105.4	84.0	49.6	2,015.7
Source: climatebase.ru (1927-2012)

Historical population
Year	Pop.	±%
1897	10,231	—
1926	20,400	+99.4%
1939	31,354	+53.7%
1959	38,318	+22.2%
1970	40,763	+6.4%
1979	56,237	+38.0%
1989	72,942	+29.7%
2002	72,561	−0.5%
2010	71,170	−1.9%
2021	70,089	−1.5%
Source: Census data

== Council of Deputies ==
The seventh convocation of the City Council was elected on the single voting day in 2022 using a mixed majority-proportional system. The composition included 22 deputies - 11 under the majoritarian system, 11 under the proportional system with a barrier of 5%.

Composition of the City Council
Party	By district	By list	Result
United Russia	11	6	17
Communist Party of the Russian Federation	0	2	2
Green Party	0	1	1
Liberal Democratic Party of Russia	0	1	1
A Just Russia	0	1	1
	11	11	22

The Chairman of the Minusinsk City Council of Deputies since 5 October 2022 is Larisa Ivanovna Chumachenko.

== Culture ==
- Minusinsk Drama Theater

Established in 1882 as an amateur theatrical society, the Minusinsk Drama Theater was known as the "Sovtheater" from 1920 to 1930. The theater building was constructed on the initiative of the exiled Kon F.Y. and funded mainly by the fire society. In the beginning, the theater was on the second floor and the fire department took up the first floor. The modern Minusinsk Drama Theater performs in this building until today. Milestones in the theater performances were 'Vasilisa Melentyeva' by Alexander Ostrovsky, 'Tsar Fyodor Ivanovich' by Alexey Tolstoy, 'Death Squadron' by A. Korneichuk, 'Destiny' by Petr Proskurin, 'Is Not Listed' by Boris Vasiliev. A performance of Alexei Cherkasov's drama “Hop” won the Stanislavsky State Prize.

- The Martyanov Natural History Museum (Museum of Local Lore)

The main attraction of the town is The Martyanov Natural History Museum. Based in 1877, it is one of the oldest in Siberia and first museum in the Yenisei's guberniya (province).

- Museum of Decembrists in Minusinsk
- Memorial building of Krzhizhanovsky and Starkov
- Minusink Art Gallery
- Museum "Automobiles And Motor Vehicles Of The Soviet Union"

== Twin towns and sister cities ==
Minusinsk is twinned with:

- Norilsk, Russia
