= Karatuzsky District =

Karatuzsky District Каратузский район (Russian)
- District
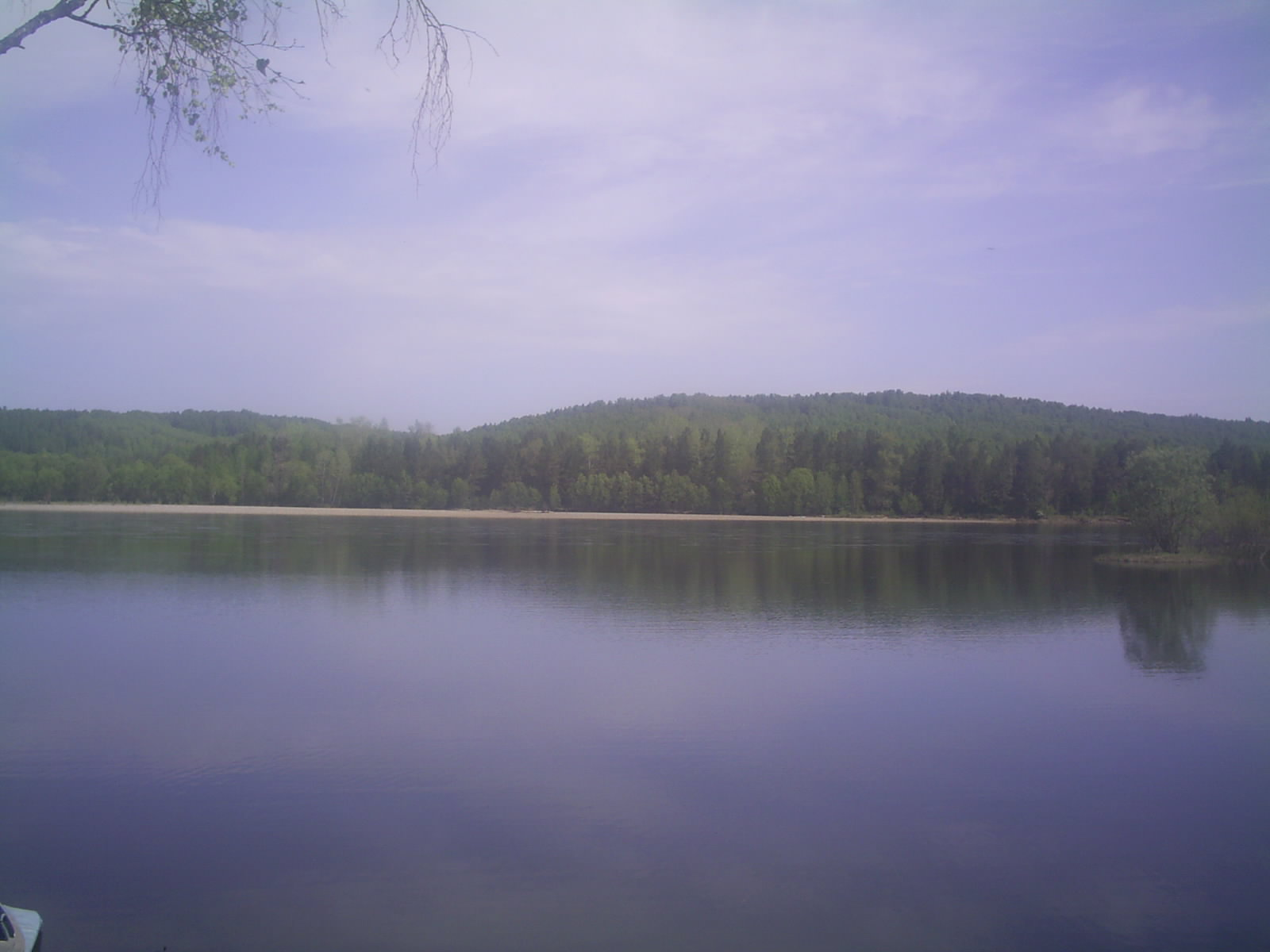
- The Kazyr River near the selo of Nizhniye Kuryaty in Karatuzsky District

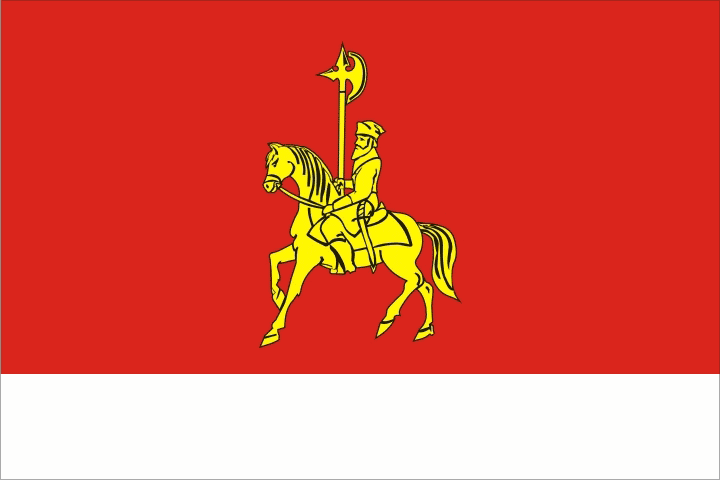
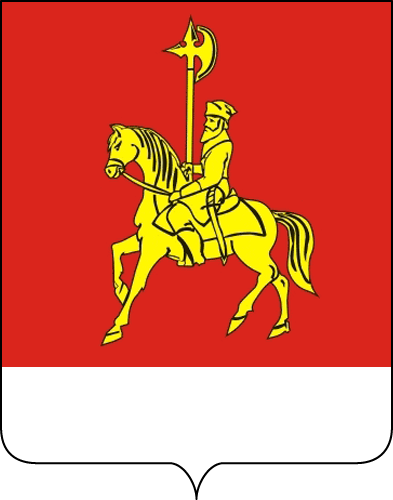
- Flag Coat of arms
- Location of Karatuzsky District in Krasnoyarsk Krai
- Coordinates: 53°36′N 92°52′E
- Country: Russia
- Federal subject: Krasnoyarsk Krai
- Established: April 4, 1924
- Administrative center: Karatuzskoye

Government
  - Type: Local government
  - Body: Karatuzsky District Council of Deputies
  - Head: Konstantin A. Tyunin

Area
  - Total: 10,236 km^{2} (3,952 sq mi)

Population (2010 Census)
  - Total: 16,036
  - Density: 1.5666/km^{2} (4.0575/sq mi)
  - Urban: 0%
  - Rural: 100%

Administrative structure
  - Administrative divisions: 14 Selsoviets
  - Inhabited localities: 28 rural localities

Municipal structure
  - Municipally incorporated as: Karatuzsky Municipal District
  - Municipal divisions: 0 urban settlements, 14 rural settlements
- Time zone: UTC+7 (MSK+4)
- OKTMO ID: 04622000

Karatuzsky District (Russian: Карату́зский райо́н) is an administrative and municipal district (raion), one of the forty-three in Krasnoyarsk Krai, Russia. It is located in the south of the krai and borders with Kuraginsky District and the Tuva Republic in the east, Yermakovsky District in the south and southwest, and with Shushensky and Minusinsky Districts in the west. The area of the district is 10,236 square kilometers (3,952 sq mi). Its administrative center is the rural locality (a selo) of Karatuzskoye. Population: 16,036 (2010 census); 18,795 (2002 Census); 19,923 (1989 Soviet census). The population of Karatuzskoye accounts for 46.5% of the district's total population.

== Geography ==
The district is located in the Amyl River basin, in the southeastern part of the Minusinsk Hollow at the spurs of eastern Sayan Mountains.

== History ==
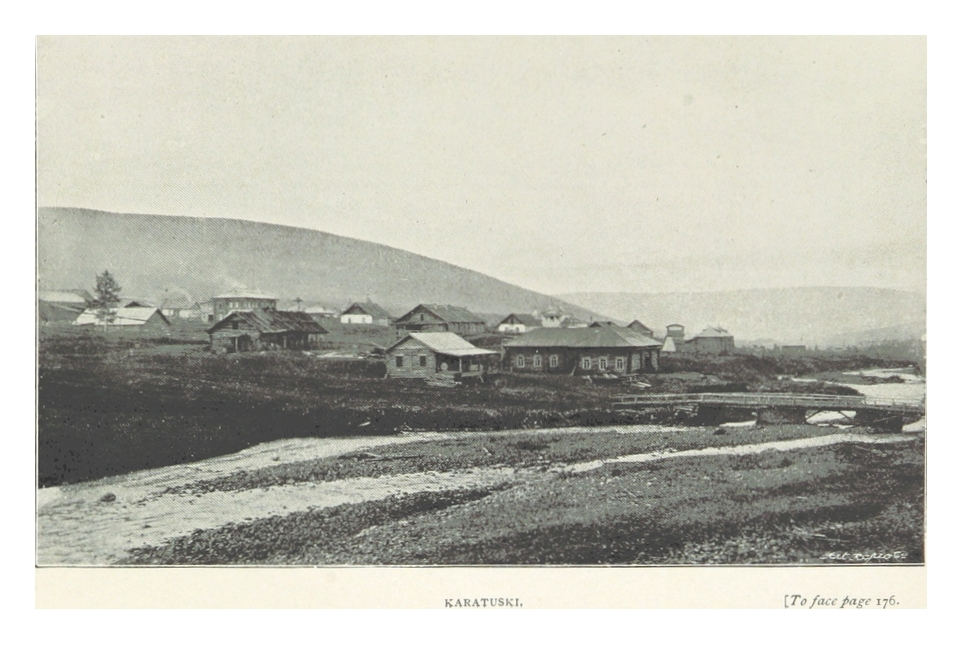
Karatuzskoye in 1895

The district was founded on April 4, 1924.

== Divisions and government ==
As of 2013, the Head of the district and the Chairman of the District Council is Konstantin A. Tyunin.
