= Zelyony Bor, Krasnoyarsk Krai =

Zelyony Bor Зелёный Бор
- Urban-type settlement
- Interactive map of Zelyony Bor
- Location of Zelyony Bor Zelyony Bor (Krasnoyarsk Krai)
- Coordinates: 53°37′12″N 91°37′48″E
- Country: Russia
- Federal subject: Krasnoyarsk Krai

Population (2010 Census)
  - Total: 2,778
  - Estimate (2021): 2,738 (−1.4%)
- Time zone: UTC+7 (MSK+4)
- Postal code: 662622
- OKTMO ID: 04723000056

Zelyony Bor (Russian: Зелёный Бор) is an urban locality (a work settlement) under the administrative jurisdiction of the Krai city of Minusinsk, in Krasnoyarsk Krai, Russia. Population: 2,778 (2010 census); 2,645 (2002 census);
