= Krasny Yar, Kugarchinsky District, Republic of Bashkortostan =

Krasny Yar Красный Яр
- Village
- Location within Bashkortostan Location within Russia
- Coordinates: 52°28′N 56°31′E
- Country: Russia
- Region: Bashkortostan
- District: Kugarchinsky District
- Time zone: UTC+5:00

Krasny Yar (Russian: Красный Яр; Bashkir: Ҡыҙылъяр, Qıźılyar) is a rural locality (a village) in Kugarchinsky Selsoviet, Kugarchinsky District, Bashkortostan, Russia. The population was 26 as of 2010. There is 1 street.

== Geography ==
Krasny Yar is located 31 km south of Mrakovo (the district's administrative centre) by road. Mukachevo is the nearest rural locality.
