= Zelyony Bor, Ivanovo Oblast =

Zelyony Bor Зелёный Бор
- Village
- Location within Ivanovo Oblast Location within Russia
- Coordinates: 56°41′N 41°33′E
- Country: Russia
- Region: Ivanovo Oblast
- District: Shuysky District
- Time zone: UTC+3:00

Zelyony Bor (Russian: Зелёный Бор) is a rural locality (a selo) in Shuysky District, Ivanovo Oblast, Russia. Population: 502 (2010 census);

== Geography ==
This rural locality is located 21 kilometres (13 mi) from Shuya (the district's administrative centre), 50 kilometres (31 mi) from Ivanovo (capital of Ivanovo Oblast) and 262 kilometres (163 mi) from Moscow. Aristovo is the nearest rural locality.
