= Platovo, Amur Oblast =

Platovo Платово
- Selo
- Location within Amur Oblast Location within Russia
- Coordinates: 50°06′N 129°03′E
- Country: Russia
- Region: Amur Oblast
- District: Zavitinsky District
- Time zone: UTC+9:00

Platovo (Russian: Платово) is a rural locality (a selo) in Albazinsky Selsoviet of Zavitinsky District, Amur Oblast, Russia. The population was 28 as of 2018. There is 1 street.

== Geography ==
Platovo is located on the left bank of the Zavitaya River, 37 km west of Zavitinsk (the district's administrative centre) by road. Albazinka is the nearest rural locality.
