= Krasny Yar, Kabansky District, Republic of Buryatia =

Krasny Yar Красный Яр
- Selo
- Location within Republic of Buryatia Location within Russia
- Coordinates: 52°10′N 106°35′E
- Country: Russia
- Region: Republic of Buryatia
- District: Kabansky District
- Time zone: UTC+8:00

Krasny Yar (Russian: Красный Яр) is a rural locality (a selo) in Kabansky District, Republic of Buryatia, Russia. The population was 378 as of 2010. There are 19 streets.

== Geography ==
Krasny Yar is located 54 km north of Kabansk (the district's administrative centre) by road. Novaya Derevnya is the nearest rural locality.
