= Karatuzskoye =

Rural locality in Krasnoyarsk Krai, Russia

Coordinates: 53°36′14″N 92°52′08″E

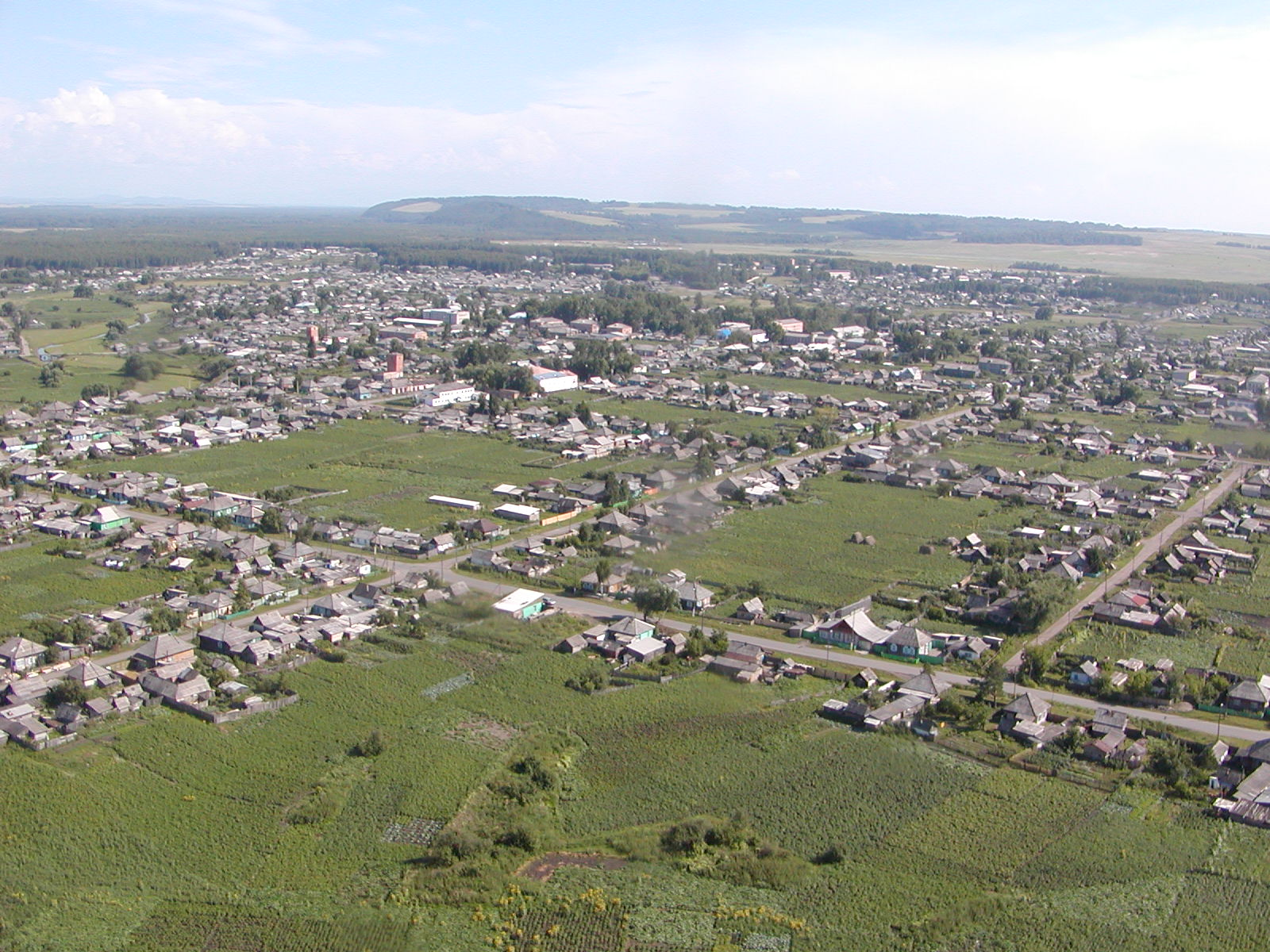
View of Karatusskoye from the air

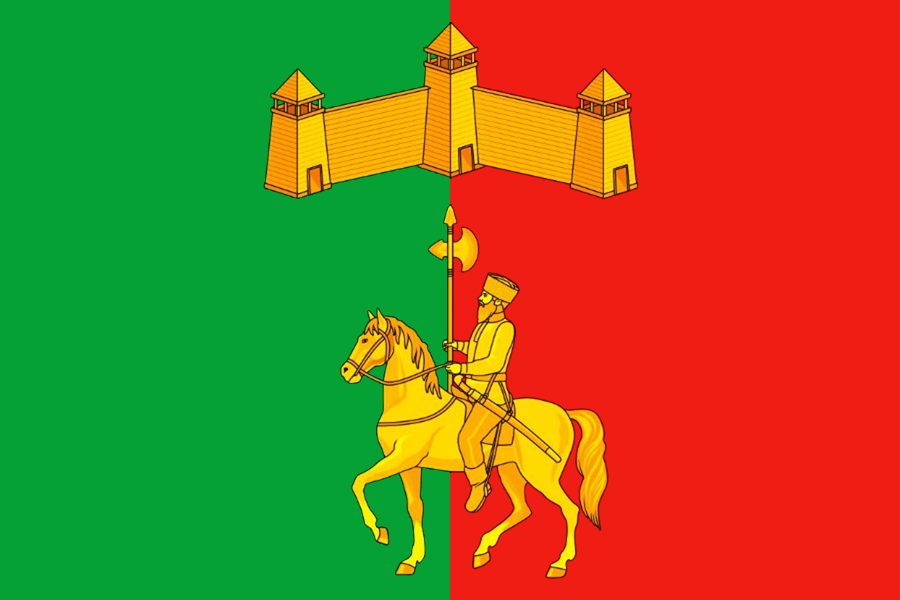
Flag of Karatuzskoye

Karatuzskoye (Russian: Карату́зское) is a rural locality (a selo) and the administrative center of Karatuzsky District, Krasnoyarsk Krai, Russia. Population: 7,456 (2010 census); 8,025 (2002 census); 8,864 (1989 Soviet census).
