= Krasny Yar, Kizhinginsky District, Republic of Buryatia =

Krasny Yar Красный Яр
- Selo
- Location within Republic of Buryatia Location within Russia
- Coordinates: 51°55′N 109°54′E
- Country: Russia
- Region: Republic of Buryatia
- District: Kizhinginsky District
- Time zone: UTC+8:00

Krasny Yar (Russian: Красный Яр) is a rural locality (a selo) in Kizhinginsky District, Republic of Buryatia, Russia. The population was 54 as of 2010. There are 2 streets.

== Geography ==
Krasny Yar is located 10 km north of Kizhinga (the district's administrative centre) by road. Kizhinga is the nearest rural locality.
