= Krasny Yar, Staropoltavsky District, Volgograd Oblast =

Krasny Yar Красный Яр
- Selo
- Location within Volgograd Oblast Location within Russia
- Coordinates: 50°37′N 45°46′E
- Country: Russia
- Region: Volgograd Oblast
- District: Staropoltavsky District
- Time zone: UTC+4:00

Krasny Yar (Russian: Красный Яр) is a rural locality (a selo) and the administrative center of Krasnoyarskoye Rural Settlement, Staropoltavsky District, Volgograd Oblast, Russia. The population was 697 as of 2010. There are 16 streets.

== Geography ==
Krasny Yar is located in steppe, on Transvolga, on the east bank of the Volgograd Reservoir, 72 km northwest from Staraya Poltavka (the district's administrative centre) by road. Belokamenka is the nearest rural locality.
