= Krasny Yar, Meleuzovsky District, Republic of Bashkortostan =

Krasny Yar Красный Яр
- Khutor
- Location within Bashkortostan Location within Russia
- Coordinates: 53°01′N 56°08′E
- Country: Russia
- Region: Bashkortostan
- District: Meleuzovsky District
- Time zone: UTC+5:00

Krasny Yar (Russian: Красный Яр; Bashkir: Ҡыҙылъяр, Qıźılyar) is a rural locality (a khutor) in Voskresensky Selsoviet, Meleuzovsky District, Bashkortostan, Russia. The population was 1 as of 2010. There is 1 street.

== Geography ==
Krasny Yar is located 19 km northeast of Meleuz (the district's administrative centre) by road. Malosharipovo is the nearest rural locality.
