= Yermakovskoye =

Rural locality in Krasnoyarsk Krai, Russia

Coordinates: 53°16′39″N 92°24′05″E

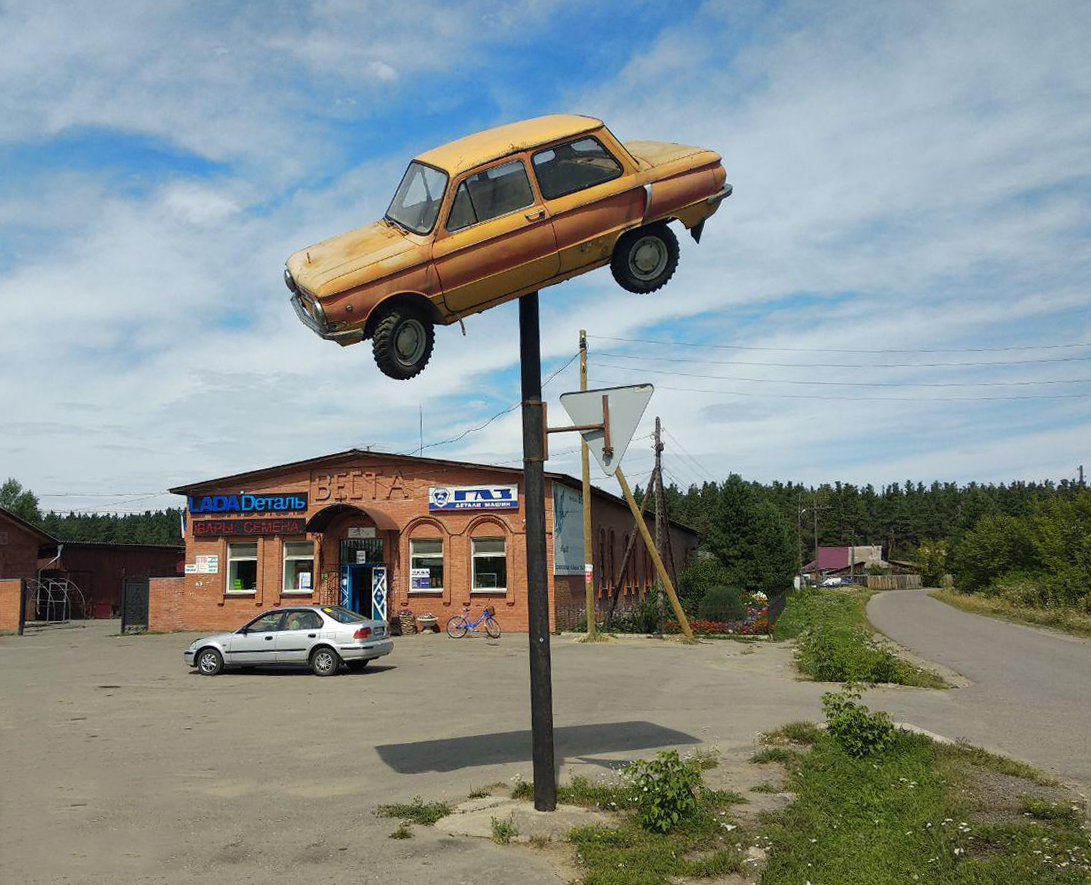
A monument of a car shop at the intersection of Karl Marx Street and Builders Street

Yermakovskoye (Russian: Ермако́вское) is a rural locality (a selo) and the administrative center of Yermakovsky District, Krasnoyarsk Krai, Russia. Population: 8,557 (2010 census); 9,051 (2002 census); 9,494 (1989 Soviet census).
