= Krasny Yar, Iglinsky District, Republic of Bashkortostan =

Krasny Yar Красный Яр
- Village
- Location within Bashkortostan Location within Russia
- Coordinates: 55°01′N 57°10′E
- Country: Russia
- Region: Bashkortostan
- District: Iglinsky District
- Time zone: UTC+5:00

Krasny Yar (Russian: Красный Яр; Bashkir: Ҡыҙылъяр, Qıźılyar) is a rural locality (a village) in Krasnovoskhodsky Selsoviet, Iglinsky District, Bashkortostan, Russia. The population was 66 as of 2010. There is 1 street.

== Geography ==
Krasny Yar is located 91 km northeast of Iglino (the district's administrative centre) by road. Chyorny Klyuch is the nearest rural locality.
