= Shushensky District =

Shushensky District Шушенский район (Russian)
- District
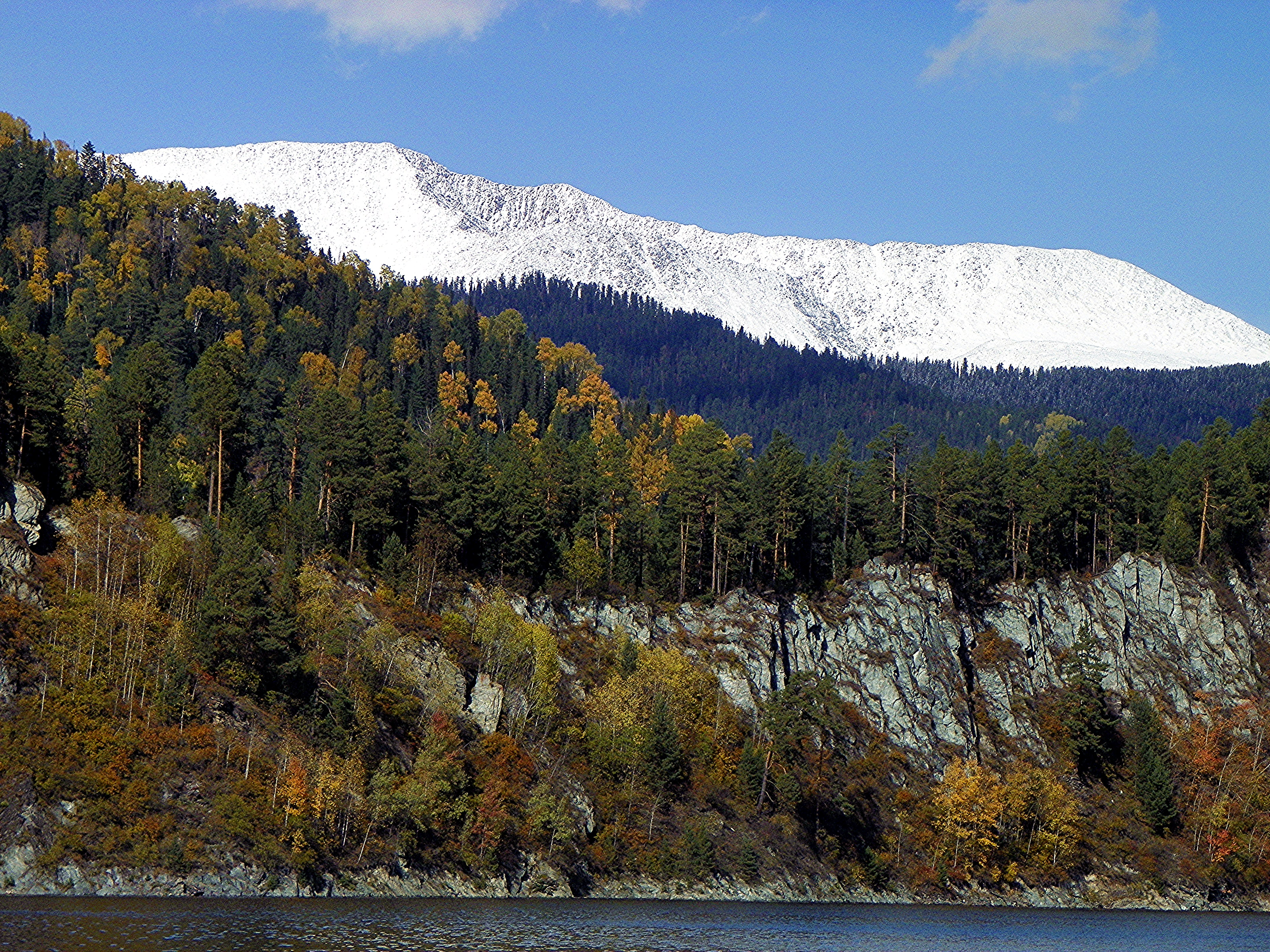
- Shushensky Forest, from river, Shushensky District

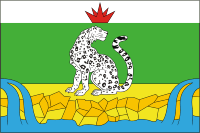
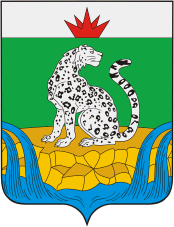
- Flag Coat of arms
- Location of Shushensky District in Krasnoyarsk Krai
- Coordinates: 53°19′33″N 91°56′22″E
- Country: Russia
- Federal subject: Krasnoyarsk Krai
- Established: January 5, 1944
- Administrative center: Shushenskoye

Government
  - Type: Local government
  - Body: Shushensky District Council of Deputies
  - Head: Anatoly G. Kerzik

Area
  - Total: 10,140 km^{2} (3,920 sq mi)

Population (2010 Census)
  - Total: 33,216
  - Density: 3.276/km^{2} (8.484/sq mi)
  - Urban: 52.7%
  - Rural: 47.3%

Administrative structure
  - Administrative divisions: 1 Urban-type settlements, 7 Selsoviets
  - Inhabited localities: 1 urban-type settlements, 29 rural localities

Municipal structure
  - Municipally incorporated as: Shushensky Municipal District
  - Municipal divisions: 1 urban settlements, 7 rural settlements
- Time zone: UTC+7 (MSK+4)
- OKTMO ID: 04659000
- Website: http://www.arshush.ru

Shushensky District (Russian: Шу́шенский райо́н) is an administrative and municipal district (raion), one of the forty-three in Krasnoyarsk Krai, Russia. It is located in the south of the krai and borders with Minusinsky District in the north, Karatuzsky District in the northeast, Yermakovsky District in the east and southeast, the Tuva Republic in the southwest, and with the Republic of Khakassia in the west. The area of the district is 10,140 square kilometers (3,920 sq mi). Its administrative center is the urban locality (an urban-type settlement) of Shushenskoye. Population: 33,216 (2010 census); 36,891 (2002 Census); 37,628 (1989 Soviet census). The population of Shushenskoye accounts for 52.7% of the district's total population.

== History ==
The district was founded on January 5, 1944.

== Government ==
As of 2013, the Head of the district and the Chairman of the District Council is Anatoly G. Kerzik.
