= Krasny Yar, Kaltasinsky District, Republic of Bashkortostan =

Krasny Yar Красный Яр
- Village
- Location within Bashkortostan Location within Russia
- Coordinates: 56°02′N 54°30′E
- Country: Russia
- Region: Bashkortostan
- District: Kaltasinsky District
- Time zone: UTC+5:00

Krasny Yar (Russian: Красный Яр; Bashkir: Ҡыҙылъяр, Qıźılyar) is a rural locality (a village) in Amzibashevsky Selsoviet, Kaltasinsky District, Bashkortostan, Russia. The population was 76 as of 2010. There is 1 street.

== Geography ==
Krasny Yar is located 26 km northwest of Kaltasy (the district's administrative centre) by road. Kangulovo is the nearest rural locality.
