= Krasny Yar, Zaigrayevsky District, Republic of Buryatia =

Krasny Yar Красный Яр
- Selo
- Location within Republic of Buryatia Location within Russia
- Coordinates: 52°12′N 108°36′E
- Country: Russia
- Region: Republic of Buryatia
- District: Zaigrayevsky District
- Time zone: UTC+8:00

Krasny Yar (Russian: Красный Яр) is a rural locality (a selo) in Zaigrayevsky District, Republic of Buryatia, Russia. The population was 30 as of 2010. There is 1 street.

== Geography ==
Krasny Yar is located 59 km northeast of Zaigrayevo (the district's administrative centre) by road. Angir is the nearest rural locality.
