= Krasny Yar, Bolshesosnovsky District, Perm Krai =

Krasny Yar Красный Яр
- Village
- Location within Perm Krai Location within Russia
- Coordinates: 57°23′N 54°26′E
- Country: Russia
- Region: Perm Krai
- District: Bolshesosnovsky District
- Time zone: UTC+5:00

Krasny Yar (Russian: Красный Яр) is a rural locality (a village) in Polozovoskoye Rural Settlement, Bolshesosnovsky District, Perm Krai, Russia. The population was 352 as of 2010. There are 7 streets.

== Geography ==
It is located 4 km north-east from Polozovo.
