= Zyalyony Bor, Smalyavichy district =

Urban-type settlement in Minsk Region, Belarus

Zyalyony Bor Зялёны Бор (Belarusian) Зелёный Бор (Russian)
- Urban-type settlement
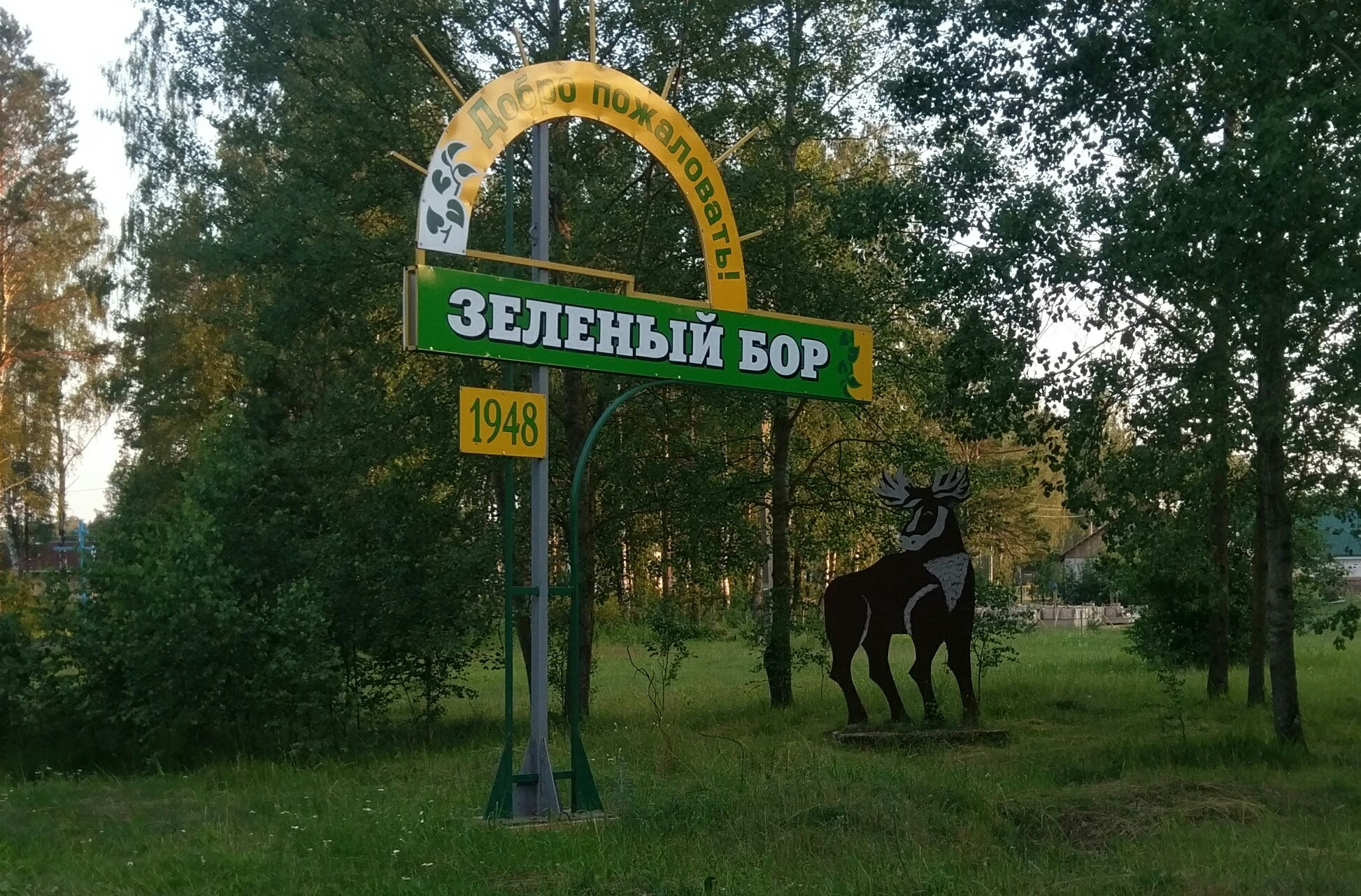

- Location within Belarus
- Coordinates: 54°00′47″N 28°28′54″E
- Country: Belarus
- Region: Minsk Region
- District: Smalyavichy District

Population (2024)
  - Total: 1,121
- Time zone: UTC+3 (MSK)

Zyalyony Bor (Belarusian: Зялёны Бор, romanized: Zialiony Bor; Russian: Зелёный Бор, romanized: Zelyony Bor) is an urban-type settlement in Smalyavichy District, Minsk Region, Belarus. As of 2024, it has a population of 1,121.
