= Yermakovskaya =

Yermakovskaya Ермаковская
- Village
- Location within Vologda Oblast Location within Russia
- Coordinates: 60°04′N 40°47′E
- Country: Russia
- Region: Vologda Oblast
- District: Syamzhensky District
- Time zone: UTC+3:00

Yermakovskaya (Russian: Ермаковская) is a rural locality (a village) in Ustretskoye Rural Settlement, Syamzhensky District, Vologda Oblast, Russia. The population was 28 as of 2002.

== Geography ==
Yermakovskaya is located 26 km northwest of Syamzha (the district's administrative centre) by road. Savinskaya is the nearest rural locality.
