= Shushenskoye =

Shushenskoe Шушенское
- Urban-type settlement
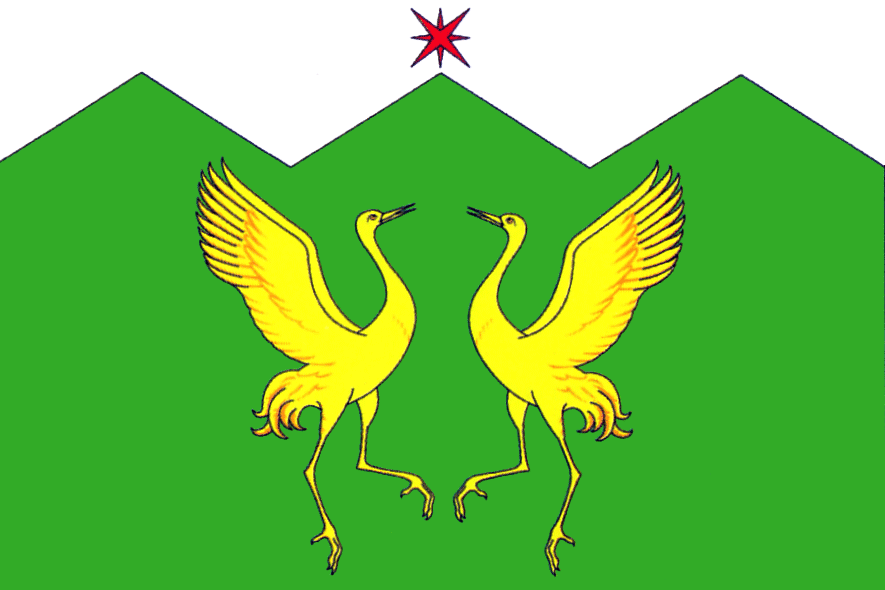
- Flag
- Interactive map of Shushenskoe
- Location of Shushenskoe Shushenskoe (Krasnoyarsk Krai)
- Coordinates: 53°19′33″N 91°56′32″E
- Country: Russia
- Federal subject: Krasnoyarsk Krai
- Administrative district: Shushensky District
- Founded: 1744

Population (2010 Census)
  - Total: 17,513
  - Estimate (2025): 16,700 (−4.6%)

Administrative status
  - Capital of: Shushensky District
- Time zone: UTC+7 (MSK+4)
- Postal code: 662720
- OKTMO ID: 04659151051

Shushenskoye (Russian: Шу́шенское, IPA: [ˈʂuʂɨnskəjɛ]) is an urban locality (an urban-type settlement) and the administrative center of Shushensky District of Krasnoyarsk Krai, Russia, located at the confluence of the Yenisei and Big Shush rivers. Population: 17,513 (2010 census); 19,067 (2002 census); 19,289 (1989 Soviet census).

== History and culture ==
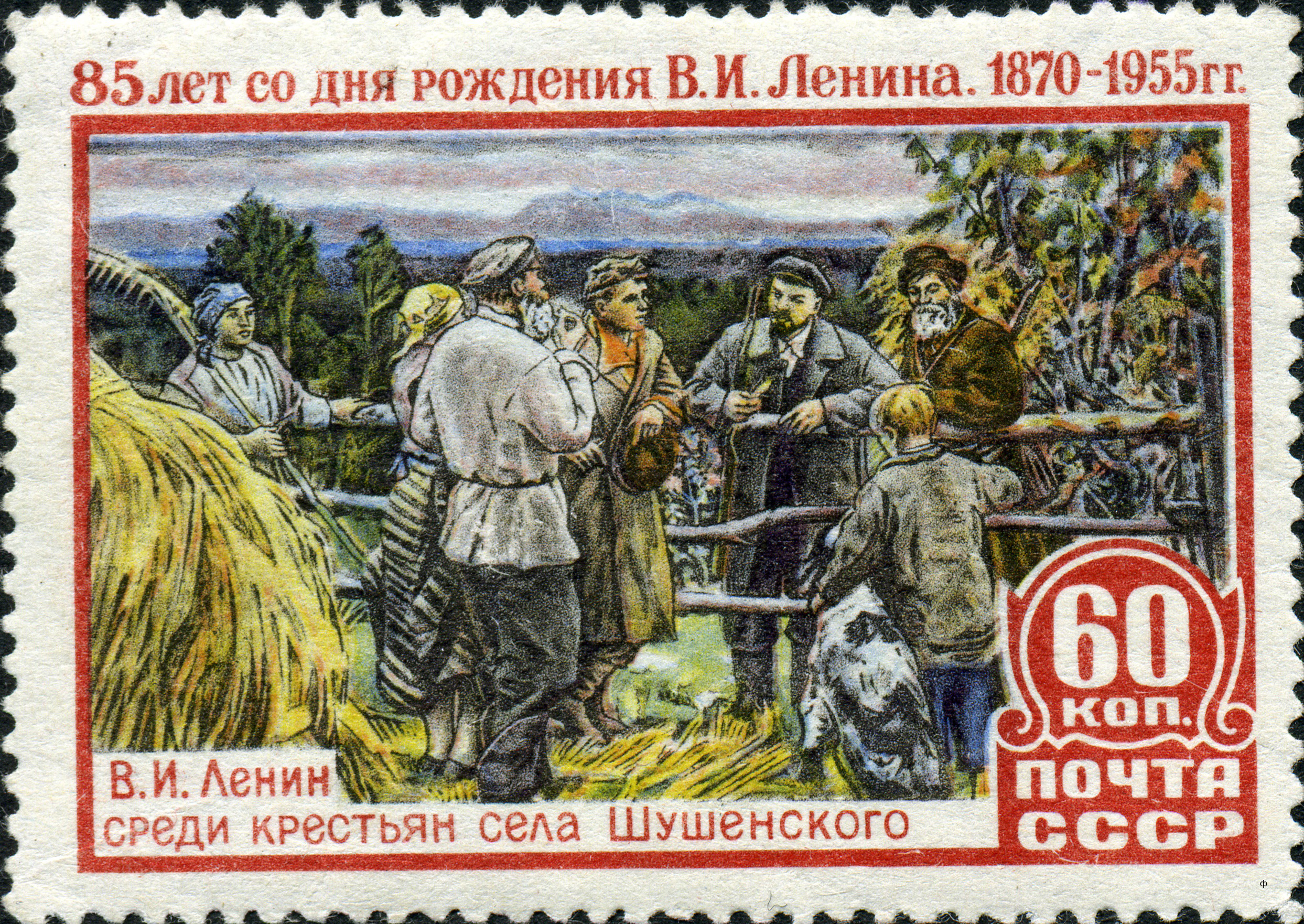
1955 postage stamp depicting Lenin's time in Shushenskoye

Vladimir Lenin was in internal exile here from 1897 to 1900. In 1970, a museum dedicated to his time in Siberia was opened which became a prominent and popular local site. Russian and international visitors go there to see the history of Lenin's stay as well as to see the peasant way of life during the 19th century. The area is also known for its nature reserves.

During 2003 and 2004, an ethnic music festival called the Sayan Ring (Саянское кольцо) was started in Shushenskoye, which draws visitors from Russia and other countries. Different ethno-music styles are played during its 3–4 day duration.

== Climate ==
The climate is very warm in summer: local people cultivate melons and watermelons. Winters are very cold with temperatures as low as −40 °C (−40 °F).
