= Shimanovsky District =

Shimanovsky District Шимановский район (Russian)
- District
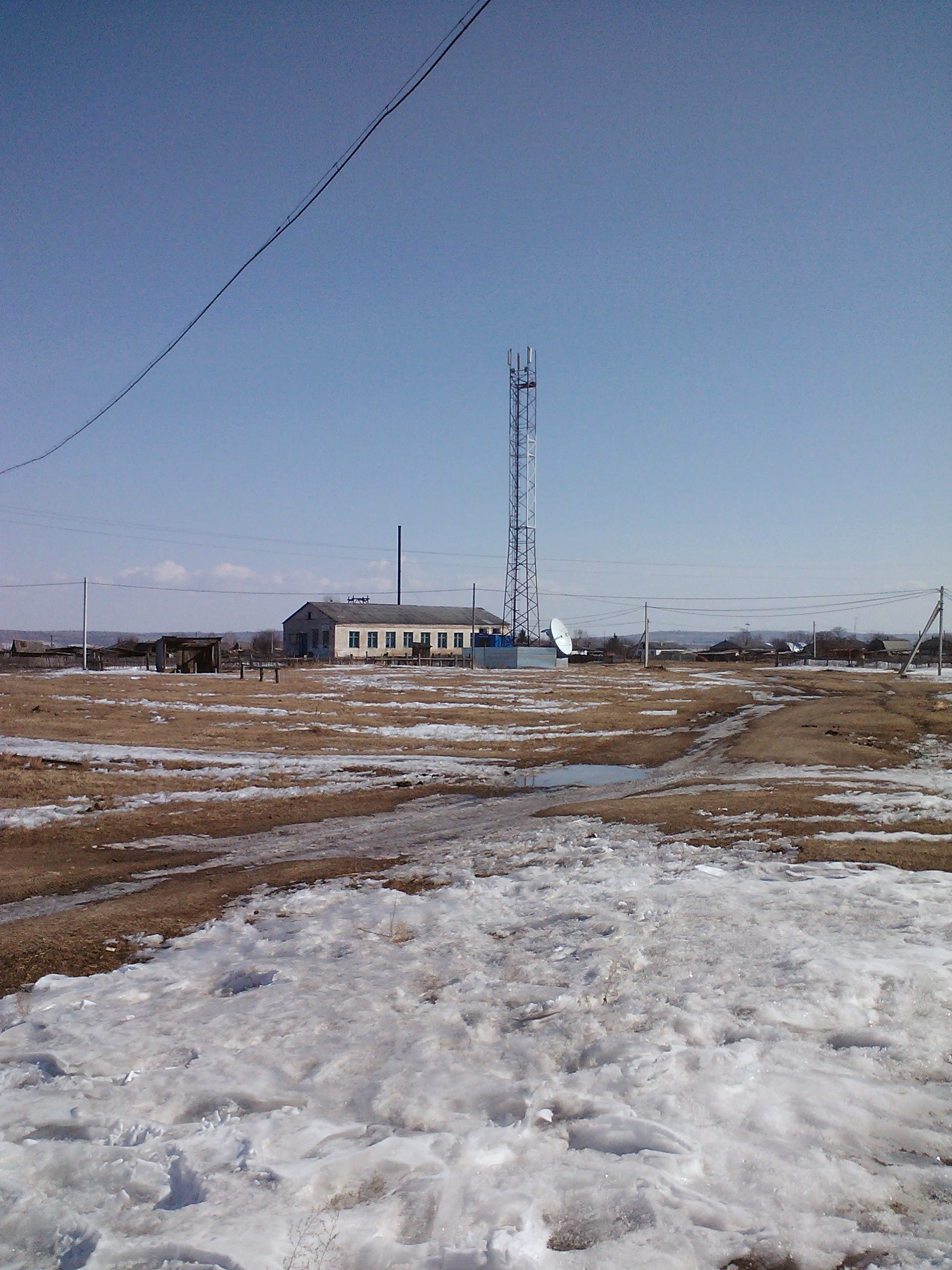
- Village of Ushakovo, Shimanovsky District

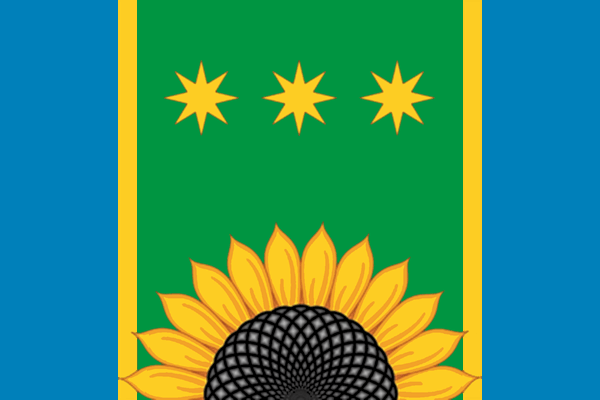
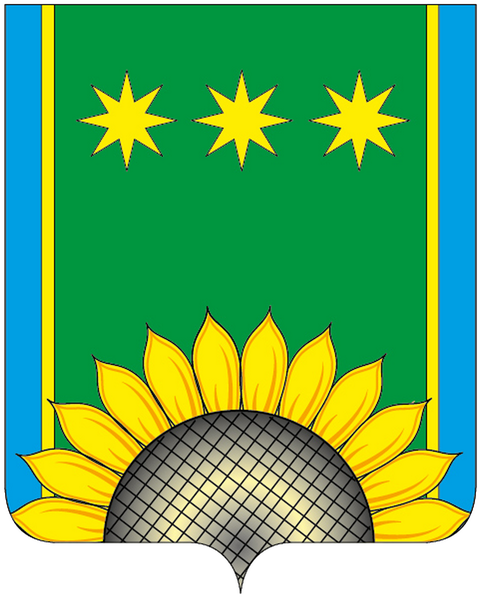
- Flag Coat of arms
- Location of Shimanovsky District in Amur Oblast
- Coordinates: 52°00′N 127°40′E
- Country: Russia
- Federal subject: Amur Oblast
- Established: 1939
- Administrative center: Shimanovsk

Area
  - Total: 14,554 km^{2} (5,619 sq mi)

Population (2010 Census)
  - Total: 5,956
  - Density: 0.4092/km^{2} (1.060/sq mi)
  - Urban: 0%
  - Rural: 100%

Administrative structure
  - Administrative divisions: 12 Rural settlements
  - Inhabited localities: 25 rural localities

Municipal structure
  - Municipally incorporated as: Shimanovsky Municipal District
  - Municipal divisions: 0 urban settlements, 12 rural settlements
- Time zone: UTC+9 (MSK+6)
- OKTMO ID: 10655000
- Website: http://www.shimraion.ru/

Shimanovsky District (Russian: Шимано́вский райо́н) is an administrative and municipal district (raion), one of the twenty in Amur Oblast, Russia. The area of the district is 14,554 square kilometers (5,619 sq mi). Its administrative center is the town of Shimanovsk (which is not administratively a part of the district). Population: 5,956 (2010 census); 7,275 (2002 Census); 8,588 (1989 Soviet census).

== History ==
The district was established in 1939.

== Administrative and municipal status ==
Within the framework of administrative divisions, Shimanovsky District is one of the twenty in the oblast. The town of Shimanovsk serves as its administrative center, despite being incorporated separately as an urban okrug—an administrative unit with the status equal to that of the districts.

As a municipal division, the district is incorporated as Shimanovsky Municipal District. Shimanovsk Urban Okrug is incorporated separately from the district.
