= Sovetskoye, Altai Krai =

Rural locality in Sovetsky District, Russia

Coordinates: 52.285°N 85.410°E

Sovetskoye (Russian: Советское) is a rural locality (a selo) and the administrative center of Sovetsky District of Altai Krai, Russia. Population: 4,634 (2021), 5,233 (2010 census); 5,449 (2002 census); 5,366 (1989 Soviet census).
