= Shimanovsk =

Town in Amur Oblast, Russia

Shimanovsk Шимановск
- Town
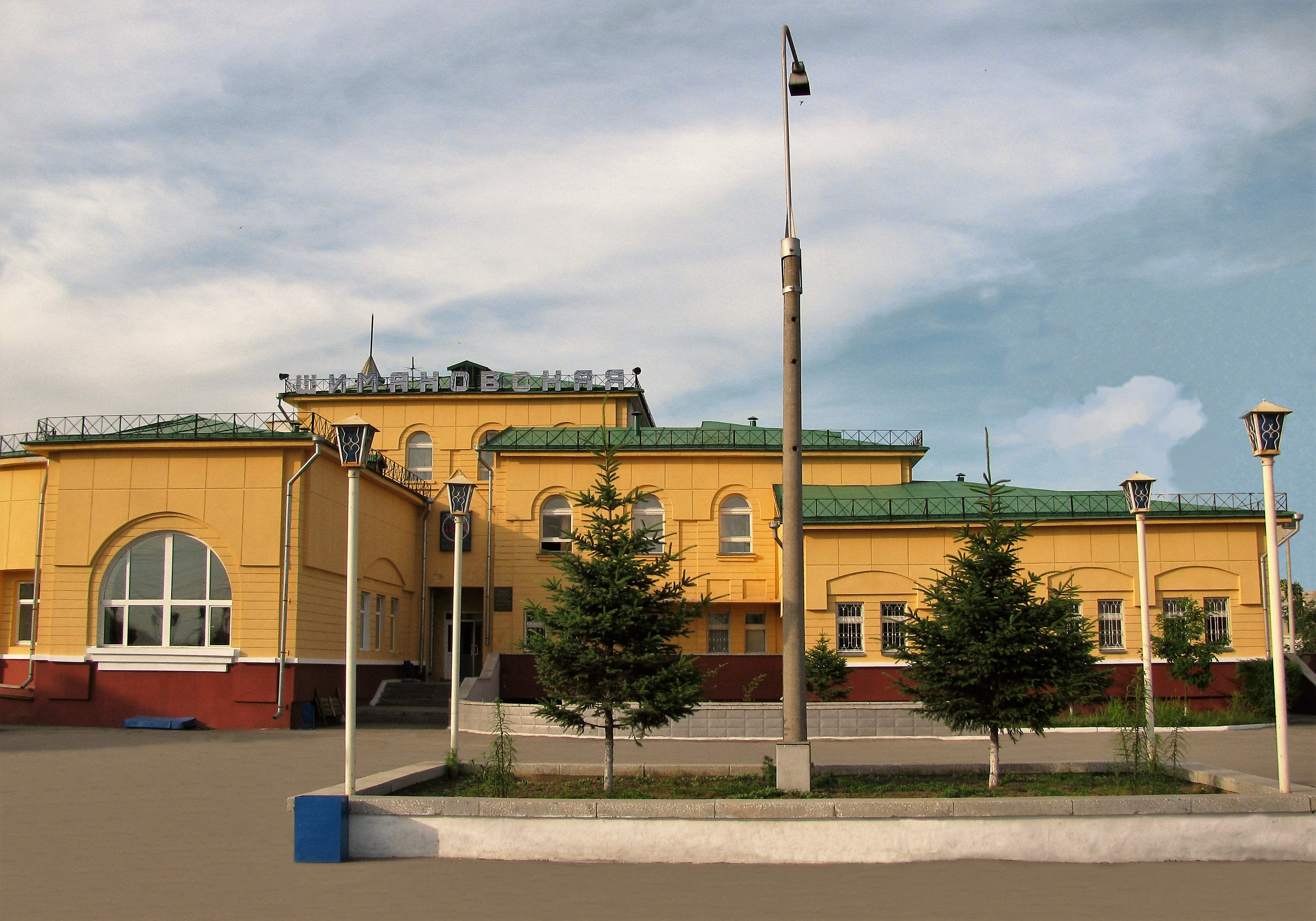
- Railway Station in Shimanovsk

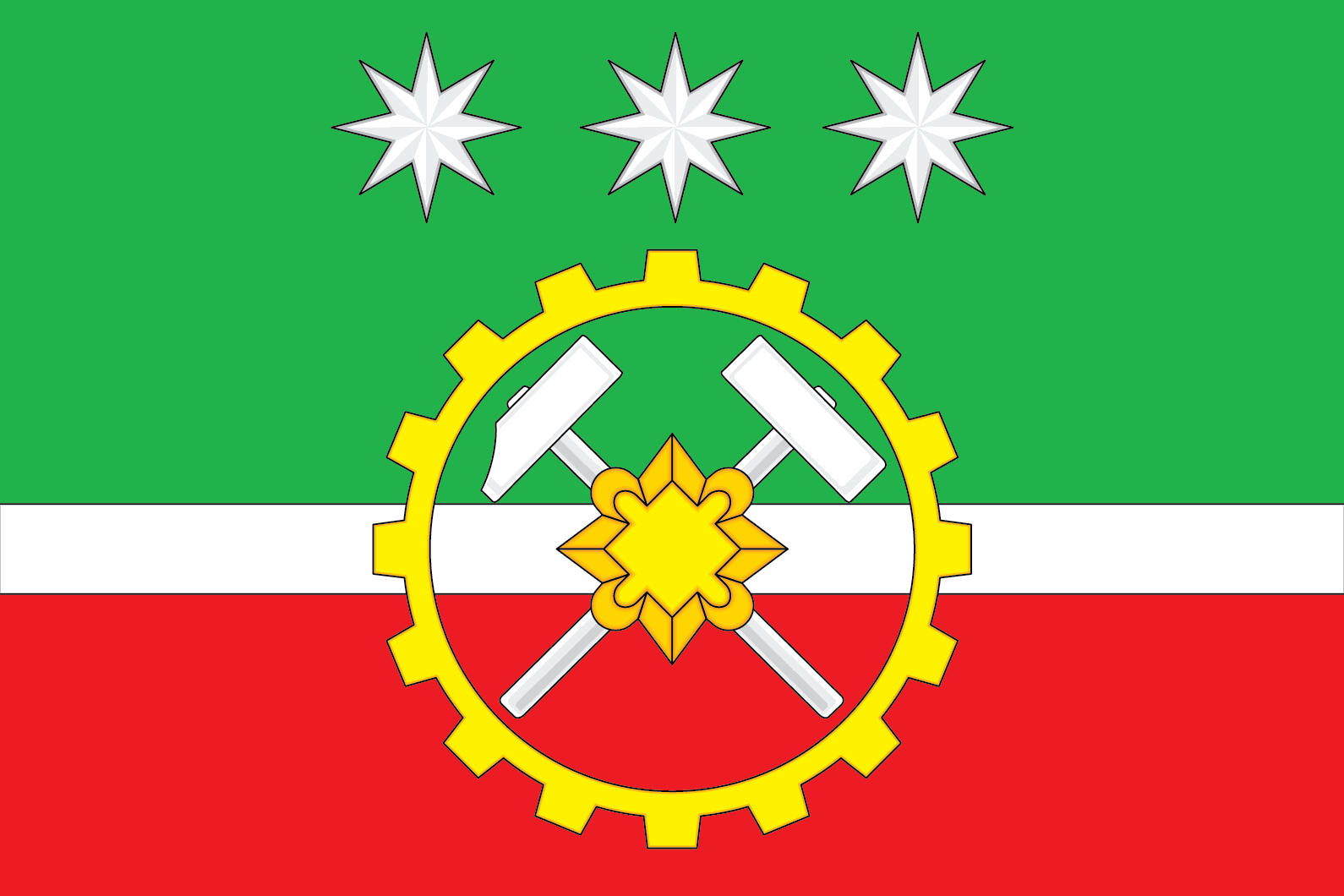
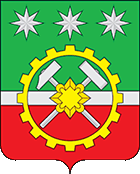
- Flag Coat of arms
- Interactive map of Shimanovsk
- Location of Shimanovsk Shimanovsk (Amur Oblast)
- Coordinates: 52°00′N 127°42′E
- Country: Russia
- Federal subject: Amur Oblast
- Founded: 1910
- Town status since: 1950

Government
  - Head: Nikolay Dontsov
- Elevation: 270 m (890 ft)

Population (2010 Census)
  - Total: 19,815
  - Estimate (2023): 16,178 (−18.4%)

Administrative status
  - Subordinated to: Shimanovsk Urban Okrug
  - Capital of: Shimanovsk Urban Okrug, Shimanovsky District

Municipal status
  - Urban okrug: Shimanovsk Urban Okrug
  - Capital of: Shimanovsk Urban Okrug, Shimanovsky Municipal District
- Time zone: UTC+9 (MSK+6)
- Postal code: 676300
- Dialing code: +7 41651
- OKTMO ID: 10740000001

Shimanovsk (Russian: Шимано́вск) is a town in Amur Oblast, Russia, located on the Bolshaya Pyora River (a right-hand tributary of the Zeya), 250 kilometers (160 mi) northwest of Blagoveshchensk. Population: 19,815 (2010 census); 22,267 (2002 census); 26,274 (1989 Soviet census).

== History ==
It was founded in conjunction with the construction of the Amur railway in 1910, originally named Pyora after the river on which it stands. It was renamed Gondatti in 1914 in honor of the then-governor of Amur Oblast, Nikolay Gondatti. In 1920, it was renamed Vladimiro-Shimanovsky after Vladimir Shimanovsky, a railway engineer and member of the Red Army who was shot dead in Blagoveshchensk during the Russian Civil War. It was granted town status and its name shortened to Shimanovsk in 1950.

During the construction of the Baikal-Amur Mainline in the 1970s, Shimanovsk saw new growth as a center for production of construction materials.

== Administrative and municipal status ==
Within the framework of administrative divisions, Shimanovsk serves as the administrative center of Shimanovsky District, even though it is not a part of it. As an administrative division, it is incorporated separately as Shimanovsk Urban Okrug—an administrative unit with the status equal to that of the districts. As a municipal division, this administrative unit also has urban okrug status.

== Economy ==
The town's primary industries are production of heavy machinery and building materials. Kranspetsburmash corporation produces cranes and drilling equipment in Shimanovsk.

=== Transportation ===
The town has a railway station (Shimanovskaya) on the Trans-Siberian Railway. The Shimanovsk Airport is situated 4 kilometers (2.5 mi) southwest of the town.

== Geography ==
The town is located on the Bolshaya Pyora River (a right-hand tributary of the Zeya), 250 kilometers (160 mi) northwest of Blagoveshchensk.

=== Climate ===
Shimanovsk, like most of Amur Oblast, has a monsoon influenced, very strongly humid continental climate (Köppen climate classification Dwb), closely bordering on a subarctic climate (Dwc). It features short, warm, and humid summers, and severely cold, dry winters. The average January temperature is −25.6 °C (−14.1 °F). The absolute minimum observed was −49.0 °C (−56.2 °F). Average July temperature is +20.1 °C (68.2 °F).

During the transition period (April and May) strong winds of up to 20 metres per second (72 km/h; 45 mph; 39 kn) are occasionally observed. In winter, the wind is weak because of the constant presence of the dense low-level Siberian High, which drives frigid air from the Siberian “cold pole”.

Climate data for Shimanovsk
Month	Jan	Feb	Mar	Apr	May	Jun	Jul	Aug	Sep	Oct	Nov	Dec	Year
Record high °C (°F)	−1.0 (30.2)	2.7 (36.9)	17.0 (62.6)	26.7 (80.1)	34.0 (93.2)	39.1 (102.4)	37.4 (99.3)	35.0 (95.0)	32.6 (90.7)	27.4 (81.3)	11.0 (51.8)	0.0 (32.0)	39.1 (102.4)
Mean daily maximum °C (°F)	−18.5 (−1.3)	−12.8 (9.0)	−3.8 (25.2)	7.8 (46.0)	17.0 (62.6)	23.9 (75.0)	25.9 (78.6)	23.3 (73.9)	16.6 (61.9)	6.1 (43.0)	−8.6 (16.5)	−17.8 (0.0)	5.0 (41.0)
Daily mean °C (°F)	−25.6 (−14.1)	−20.6 (−5.1)	−10.5 (13.1)	2.0 (35.6)	10.4 (50.7)	17.5 (63.5)	20.1 (68.2)	17.4 (63.3)	10.0 (50.0)	−0.3 (31.5)	−14.7 (5.5)	−24.1 (−11.4)	−1.5 (29.3)
Mean daily minimum °C (°F)	−32.5 (−26.5)	−28.9 (−20.0)	−19.4 (−2.9)	−5.4 (22.3)	2.2 (36.0)	9.2 (48.6)	13.2 (55.8)	10.6 (51.1)	2.8 (37.0)	−7.2 (19.0)	−21.4 (−6.5)	−30.4 (−22.7)	−8.9 (16.0)
Record low °C (°F)	−49 (−56)	−46.1 (−51.0)	−37.2 (−35.0)	−23.9 (−11.0)	−8.5 (16.7)	−2.0 (28.4)	1.2 (34.2)	−0.5 (31.1)	−10 (14)	−24 (−11)	−37.7 (−35.9)	−48.9 (−56.0)	−49 (−56)
Average precipitation mm (inches)	6.3 (0.25)	8.3 (0.33)	10.2 (0.40)	28.8 (1.13)	38.4 (1.51)	78.6 (3.09)	125.9 (4.96)	84.0 (3.31)	62.7 (2.47)	24.9 (0.98)	17.1 (0.67)	10.7 (0.42)	495.9 (19.52)
Average relative humidity (%)	74.2	69.4	64.1	57.5	60.3	68.5	78.0	78.8	72.7	66.1	74.4	75.1	69.9
Source: climatebase.ru
