= Sovetsky District, Altai Krai =

Sovetsky District Советский район (Russian)
- District
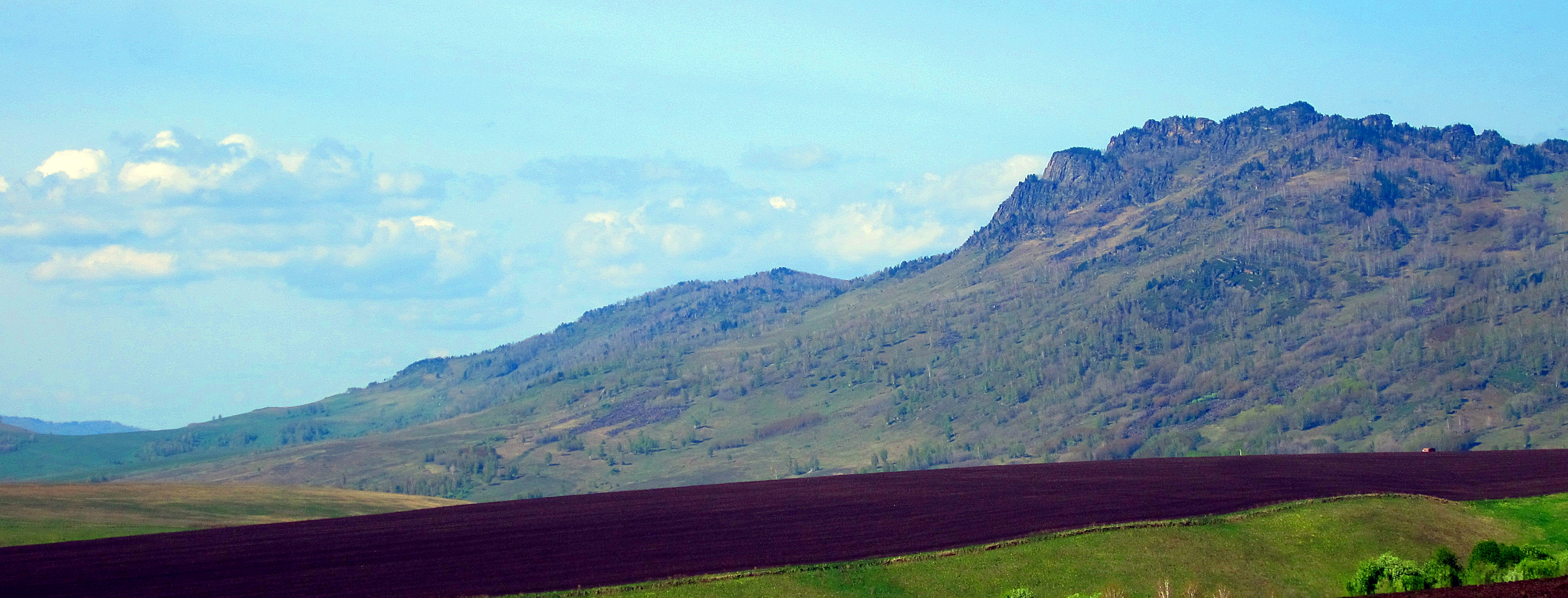
- View of Bobyrgan Mountain, Sovetsky District

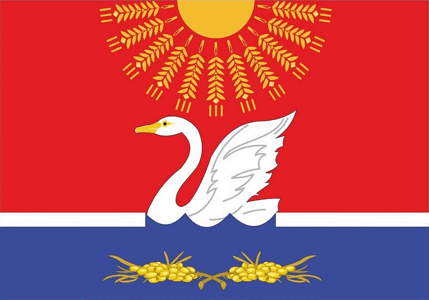
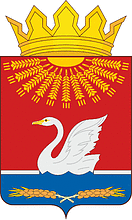
- Flag Coat of arms
- Location of Sovetsky District in Altai Krai
- Coordinates: 52°17′50″N 85°25′00″E
- Country: Russia
- Federal subject: Altai Krai
- Established: 18 January 1935
- Administrative center: Sovetskoye

Area
  - Total: 1,545 km^{2} (597 sq mi)

Population (2010 Census)
  - Total: 16,467
  - Density: 10.66/km^{2} (27.60/sq mi)
  - Urban: 0%
  - Rural: 100%

Administrative structure
  - Administrative divisions: 12 selsoviet
  - Inhabited localities: 20 rural localities

Municipal structure
  - Municipally incorporated as: Sovetsky Municipal District
  - Municipal divisions: 0 urban settlements, 12 rural settlements
- Time zone: UTC+7 (MSK+4)
- OKTMO ID: 01642000
- Website: http://www.sovetskoe-alt.ru/

Sovetsky District (Russian: Сове́тский райо́н) is an administrative and municipal district (raion), one of the fifty-nine in Altai Krai, Russia. It is located in the southeast of the krai. The area of the district is 1,545 square kilometers (597 sq mi). Its administrative center is the rural locality (a selo) of Sovetskoye. Population: 16,467 (2010 census); 18,060 (2002 census); 17,381 (1989 Soviet census). The population of Sovetskoye accounts for 31.8% of the district's total population.

== Geography ==
Sovetsky District is located on the south-central edge of Altai Krai, on the border with Altai Republic to the southeast. The terrain is mostly peidmont forest-steppe, just west of the foothills of the Western Sayan Range of the Altai Mountains. The Katun River forms the eastern and northern borders of the district, as it flows south-to-north to the Ob River to the north. The Katun is typically frozen from December to early April.

Sovetsky District is 195 km southeast of the city of Barnaul, and 3,000 km south of Moscow. The area measures 40 km (north-south), and 45 km (west-east); total area is 1545 km2 (about 0.91% of Altai Krai). The administrative center is the town of Sovetskoye.

The district is bordered on the north by Biysky District, on the east by Krasnogorsky District, on the south by Altaysky District, and on the west by Smolensky District.
