= Poyarkovo, Amur Oblast =

Rural locality in Russia

Coordinates: 49.625°N 128.653°E

Poyarkovo (Russian: Поя́рково) is a rural locality (a selo) and the administrative center of Mikhaylovsky District of Amur Oblast, Russia. Population: 6,951 (2010 census); 7,283 (2002 census); 8,320 (1989 Soviet census).
