= Smalyavichy district =

District of Minsk Region, Belarus

Smalyavichy district Смалявіцкі раён (Belarusian) Смолевичский район (Russian)
- District
- Flag Coat of arms

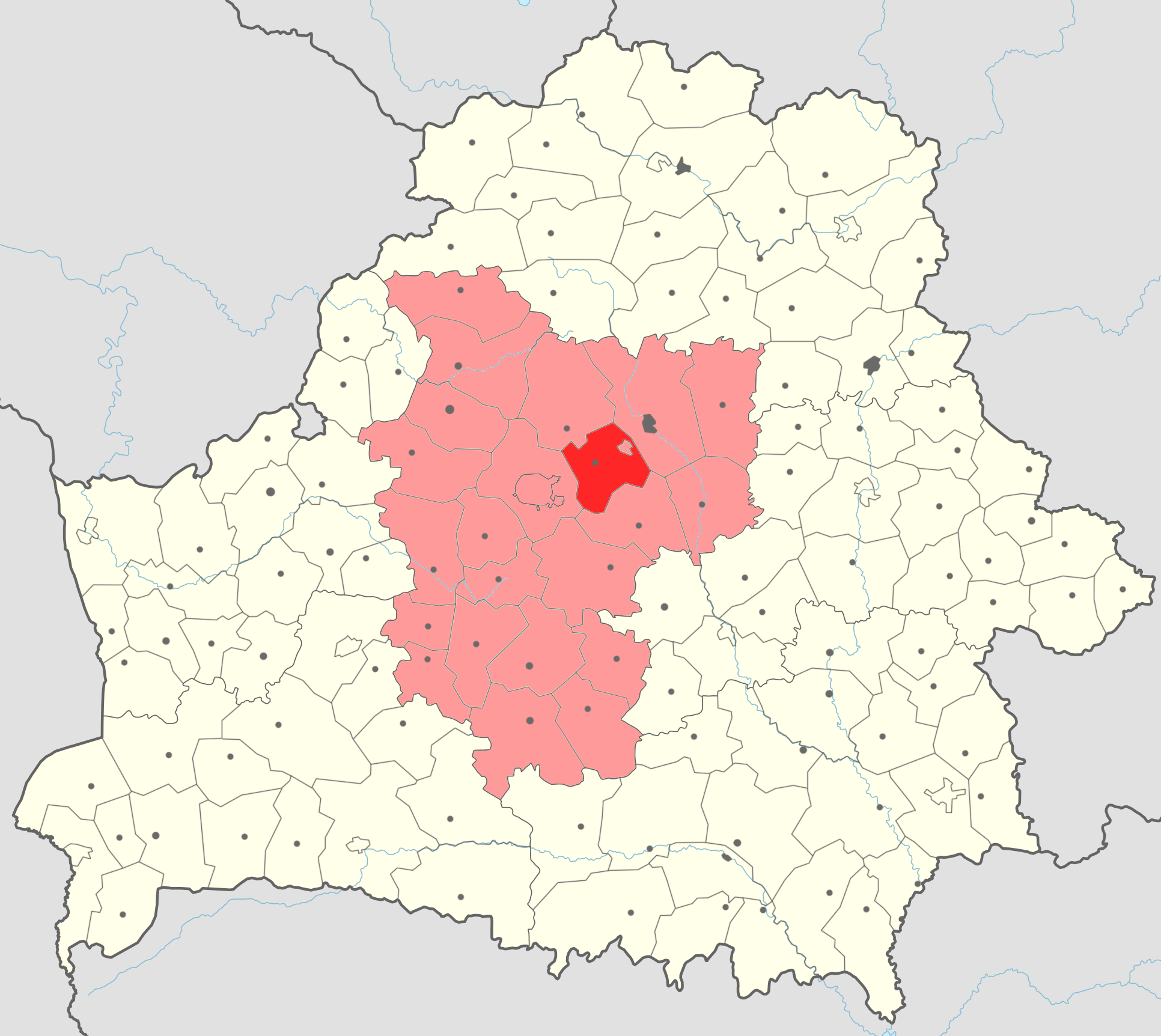
- Coordinates: 54°01′22″N 28°04′19″E
- Country: Belarus
- Region: Minsk region
- Administrative center: Smalyavichy

Area
  - District: 1,400 km^{2} (540 sq mi)

Population (2024)
  - District: 55,439
  - Urban: 23,800
  - Rural: 31,639
- Time zone: UTC+3 (MSK)
- Website: Official website

Smalyavichy district or Smaliavičy district (Belarusian: Смалявіцкі раён, romanized: Smalavicki rajon; Russian: Смолевичский район, romanized: Smolevičskij raion) is a district (raion) of Minsk region in Belarus. Its administrative center is the town of Smalyavichy. The town of Zhodzina is administratively separated from the district. As of 2024, it has a population of 55,439.

== History ==
The district was created on 17 July 1924.

== Geography ==
=== Overview ===
Situated in the north-east of its Region, Smalyavichy District borders with the districts of Minsk, Lahoysk, Barysaw and Chervyen. In its territory is located the International Airport of Minsk. It is crossed by the M1 motorway, part of the European route E30.

=== Main settlements ===
- Zhodzina
- Smalyavichy
- Zyalyony Bor
