= Mikhaylovsky District, Amur Oblast =

Mikhaylovsky District Михайловский район (Russian)
- District
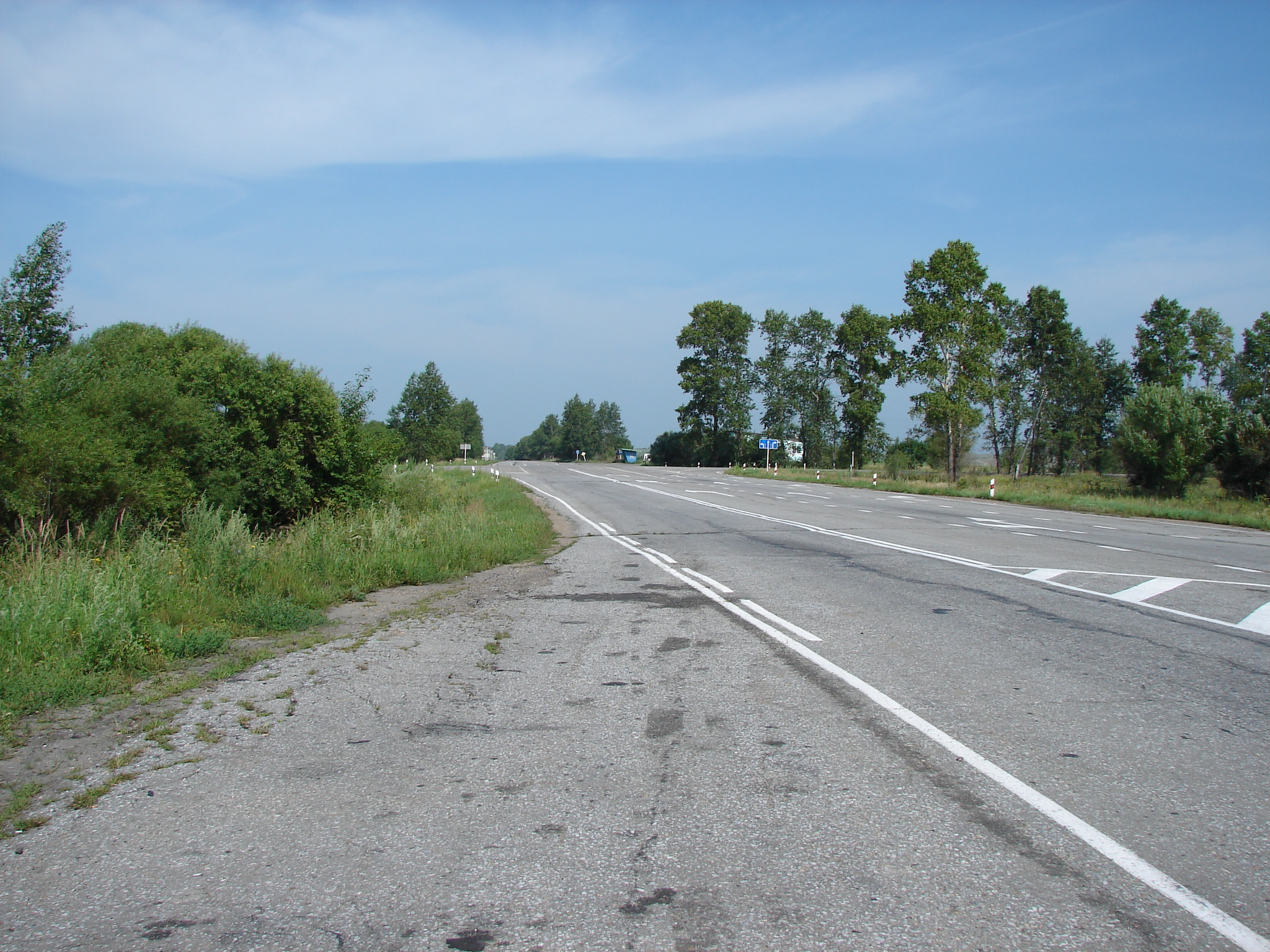
- Road in Mikhaylovsky District

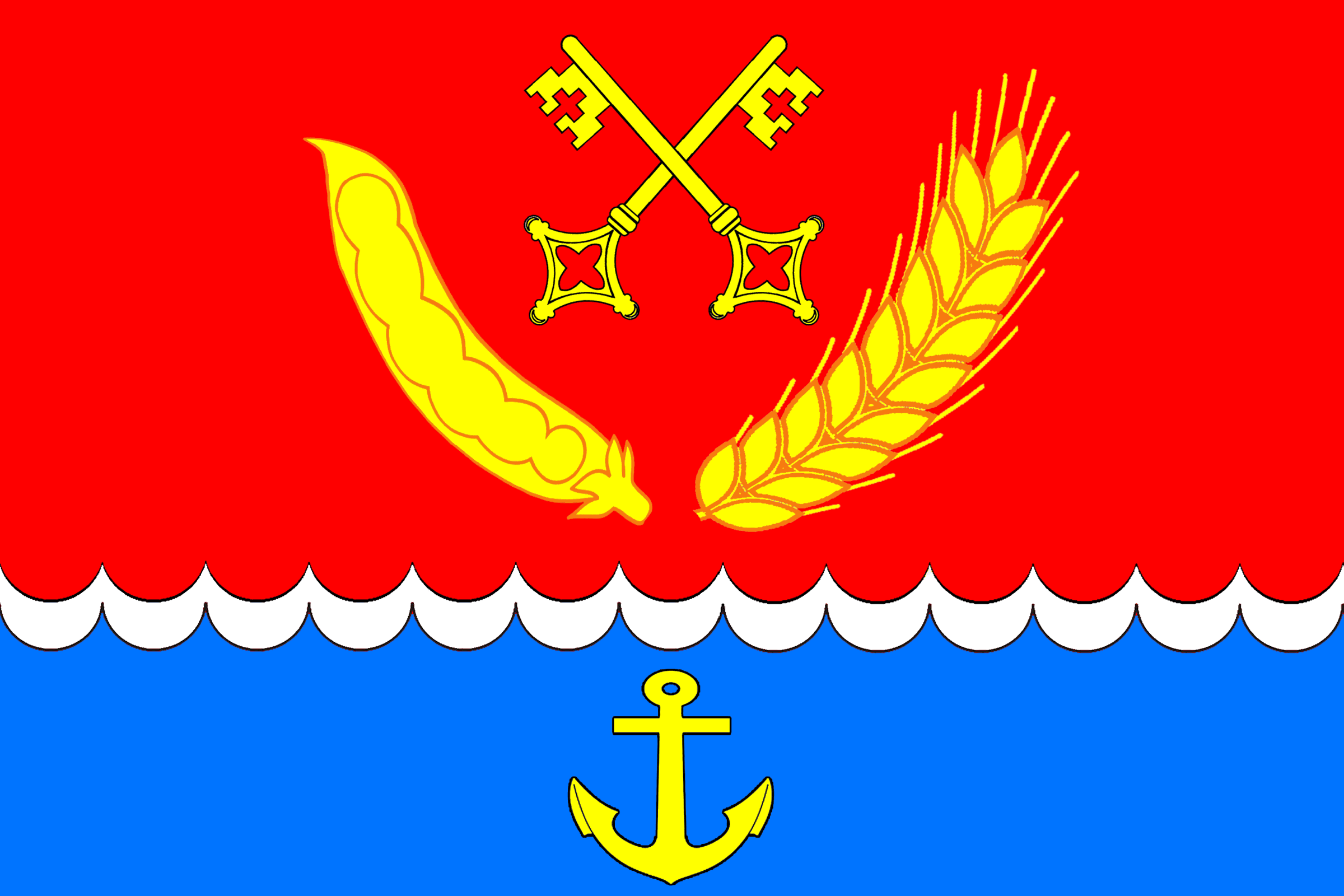
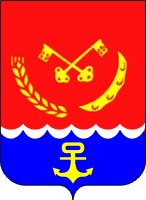
- Flag Coat of arms
- Location of Mikhaylovsky District in Amur Oblast
- Coordinates: 49°38′00″N 128°38′30″E
- Country: Russia
- Federal subject: Amur Oblast
- Established: 4 January 1926
- Administrative center: Poyarkovo

Area
  - Total: 3,039 km^{2} (1,173 sq mi)

Population (2010 Census)
  - Total: 14,850
  - Density: 4.886/km^{2} (12.66/sq mi)
  - Urban: 0%
  - Rural: 100%

Administrative structure
  - Administrative divisions: 11 Rural settlements
  - Inhabited localities: 29 rural localities

Municipal structure
  - Municipally incorporated as: Mikhaylovsky Municipal District
  - Municipal divisions: 0 urban settlements, 11 rural settlements
- Time zone: UTC+9 (MSK+6)
- OKTMO ID: 10635000
- Website: http://www.mihadm.amsu.ru/

Mikhaylovsky District (Russian: Миха́йловский райо́н) is an administrative and municipal district (raion), one of the twenty in Amur Oblast, Russia. The area of the district is 3,039 square kilometers (1,173 sq mi). Its administrative center is the rural locality (a selo) of Poyarkovo. Population: 14,850 (2010 census); 17,081 (2002 Census); 21,113 (1989 Soviet census). The population of Poyarkovo accounts for 46.8% of the district's total population.
