= Project 5-100 =

Russian university development project

Project 5-100 logo

Project 5-100 was a special government-run program to develop major Russian universities. The program was launched by the Russian Ministry of Education and Science in 2013. It was aimed at improving the prestige of Russian higher education and bring at least five universities from among the project participants into the 100 best universities in the world according to the three most authoritative world rankings: Academic Ranking of World Universities (ARWU), Times Higher Education (THE), and Quacquarelli Symonds (QS) by 2020. However, this goal was never achieved.

Project 5-100 played a significant role in increasing the visibility and status of Russian higher education and science in the global scientific and educational space. Based on the analysis of the results, Accounts Chamber of Russia concluded that the program generally corresponded to many trends that designate the initiatives of academic excellence in leading economies, including stimulating competition among universities, internationalising all areas of activity and increasing scientific potential.

The implementation of Project 5-100 allegedly led to significant positive systemic changes. It noticeably strengthened university science, without which advancement in global rankings could not be possible. The number of Russian universities in the international institutional rankings ARWU, THE and QS increased more than threefold, from 15 to 51. Moscow State University was the only one to rank within the first 100 positions in ARWU and QS by 2020; however, some of the institutions were successful in subject-specific rankings: eight universities participating in the program were included in the top-100 World subject rankings, taking 16 positions. A significant qualitative shift reportedly took place in the development of the Russian higher education system and science in general. Project 5-100 universities also formed a modern infrastructure for solving various scientific issues. Within the walls of educational institutions, new world-class research laboratories, in which the work was headed by leading Russian and foreign scientists, were established. Students, undergraduates, and postgraduates are involved in the new laboratories to conduct research in topical scientific areas.

== Participating universities ==
The 21 participants of Project 5-100, which would receive government support, were chosen through a two-stage process. The first stage was announced on 8 May 2013. From 54 applications, 36 were chosen to participate, and of these, only 15 succeeded. The board added another 6 universities to this group in October 2015.

- Immanuel Kant Baltic Federal University (IKBFU) (Kaliningrad)
- Higher School of Economics (HSE) (Moscow)
- Far Eastern Federal University (FEFU) (Vladivostok)
- Kazan Federal University (KFU) (Kazan)
- Moscow Institute of Physics and Technology (MIPT) (Moscow)
- National University of Science and Technology MISiS (NUST MISiS) (Moscow)
- National Research Nuclear University MEPhI (Moscow)
- Lobachevsky University (UNN) (Nizhny Novgorod)
- Novosibirsk State University (NSU) (Novosibirsk)
- First Moscow State Medical University (MSMU) (Moscow)
- Peoples' Friendship University of Russia (RUDN) (Moscow)
- Samara National Research University (SSAU) (Samara)
- Saint-Petersburg Electrotechnical University (LETI) (Saint Petersburg)
- Peter the Great St. Petersburg Polytechnic University (SPbPU) (Saint Petersburg)
- Siberian Federal University (SIBFU) (Krasnoyarsk)
- Tomsk State University (TSU) (Tomsk)
- Tomsk Polytechnic University (TPU) (Tomsk)
- University of Tyumen (Tyumen)
- ITMO University (Saint Petersburg)
- Ural Federal University (UrFu) (Ekaterinburg)
- South Ural State University (Chelyabinsk)

Altogether, over 390,000 students were enrolled in these universities, and 12 Nobel Laureates were employed. The project was not limited to only these chosen universities; additional universities may have been added from a group of regional universities depending on their development and the program's budget.

Moscow State University and St Petersburg State University are not participating in the program as they are funded separately (2 billion rubles from 2014–2016).

== Council ==
A "Council on Competitiveness Enhancement of Leading Russian Universities" among "Global Research and Education Centers" oversaw the project. The council was created in the spring of 2013, chosen by the government. The council reviewed the universities' reports, deciding how much was needed to follow up, and communicated its findings to the "Ministry of Education and Science" to determine if each of the program's selected universities would receive continued support.

The members of the International Council were:

- Andrei Volkov, professor of the Moscow School of Management (SKOLKOVO)
- Alexander Abramov, chairman of the board of directors in EVRAZ Plc
- Philip G. Altbach, founder of the Center for International Higher Education in Boston
- Malcolm J. Grant, chairman of NHS England
- Herman Gref, president and chairman of the board Sberbank
- Koenraad Debackere, managing director of the Catholic University of Leuven
- Valery Kozlov, acting president of the Russian Academy of Sciences
- Michael M. Crow, president of Arizona State University
- Weifang Min, executive president of the Chinese Society for Education Development Strategies
- Lap-Chee Tsui, president of Hong Kong University

The chairman was Olga Golodets, who, at the time, was Deputy Prime Minister for Social Affairs. The deputy chairman was Olga Vasilieva, who, at the time, was Minister of Education and Science.

== Objectives of 5-100 ==
The following were the specific objectives and key performance indicators for the universities:

- To increase research potential
- To produce world-class intellectual products and educational programs
- To integrate innovation in higher education, to develop general and extra-curricular education, to make science popular amongst children and youth, to stimulate them in artistic activities
- To have at least 10% international professors amongst the staff and no less than 15% international students.

In addition, all universities, even those not involved in the project, should strive to improve their employee's science citation index.

== Funding ==
In 2013, the Government released a resolution stating that the budget would be 57.1 billion rubles until 2017: 9 billion in 2013, 10.5 billion in 2014, 12 billion in 2015, 12.5 billion in 2016, and 13.1 billion in 2016. In November 2015 Dmitry Medvedev signed a resolution that extends the program until 2020, as well as increasing university funding to 14.5 billion (2 and 1.4 billion respectively) for 2016 and 2017. Hence, the project budget for 2013-2017 was made up of a total of 60.5 billion rubles.

The increase in funding was mainly due to the inclusion of six more universities in the program. The Council was looking at opportunities to extend the list to an additional 10-15 universities, as the current list does not have any representatives of universities in the field of agriculture or transport.

Distribution of subsidies

Every year the Ministry of Education allocates funds amongst the universities based on an assessment of their implementation of the program for enhancing the competitiveness «Road Map» and their current position in various world rankings. From mid 2015, the project leaders and best universities in the country were: HSE, ITMO University, Tomsk Polytechnic University and Tomsk State University. Each received subsidies of one billion rubles each year. NSU was developing steadily. It received 592.4 million rubles in 2013, 775 million in 2014, and 761 million in 2015. In 2016, the Council endorsed funding of 900 million USD to the following universities: KFU, MIPT, MISiS, HSE, MEPhl, NSU and ITMO University.

Conversely, in September 2014, the Council did not approve the «Road Map» of ETU, deeming it unappealing for international students, and prohibiting it from using the budget of 600-700 million rubles allocated in 2013 for the first stage. The university was still participating in the project, however, two years later the «Road Map» was reviewed.

Economic Policies of the Ministry of Education and Science

In late 2014, the Government planned to severely cut the funding for the program; however, Dmitry Livanov suggested keeping the amount of government support as it was before the economic crisis. He was notified that more funding would not be given and the Ministry would have to cover the difference from its own budget.

Criticism of the Project

The Ministry of Economic Development's initiative in the educational sector brought about much criticism. The economist, Sergey Guriyev, who at the time was rector of the New Economic School (NES), believed the government should subsidise student loans as it was responsible for the high interest rates.

The Deputy Head of the State Duma Committee on Education, Vladimir Burmatov, sent an inquiry to the Accounts Chamber with a request to investigate the full expenditure of funds allocated to the Ministry of Education for the program, as he believed there were several irregular expenditures. For example, sending money directly to the organisers of the rankings, large sums spent on organisers and participants' hotel accommodation (about half a billion rubles), air travel (more than 4 million rubles), banquets (2.6 million rubles) and meetings (more than 2 million rubles). Burmatov's party "United Russia" even raised the question whether Livanov should be excluded from the Party for "a failure to reform universities and a mess in the education system", but the head of the party, Dmitry Medvedev, rejected this proposal. Andrey Rostovtsev, physicist and founder of the Dissernet project, supported Burmatov's claims. In his opinion, in order to develop confidence in Russian universities, it was necessary to restore the reputation of both the universities and their staff. The Ministry of Education considered this claim to be unfounded and referred to regular progress reports of the participating universities.

== Russian universities and international ratings ==
The most authoritative world rankings for educational institutions are published by: Times Higher Education (THE) magazine, the British company Quacquarelli Symonds (QS) and the Shanghai Jiao Tong University (ARWU).

These international rating agencies assess the universities on the basis of specific criteria. Some examples are the following: publicity and citations (h-index, which assesses the contribution of the scientist to science), the number of Nobel laureates, and the opinion of the academic community and employers.

The goal of the initiative was to bring at least five universities from among the project participants into the 100 best universities in the world according to these rankings. However, Moscow State University was the only institution that met these criteria by the end of the project in 2020. The table below shows the number of Russian institutions scoring in top 100 positions in international university rankings at the start of the project (2013) and at its end (2020):

Number of Russian institutions in top100
	2013	2020
ARWU	1	1
QS	0	1
THE	0	0

Times Higher Education

Only two Russian universities have made it to the THE Education World University Rankings: MSU, at 25th place, after being in the 51-60 group, and St. Petersburg State University, which was in the 71-80 group.

In the area of biotechnology and astrophysics, Russian universities cannot compete with overseas universities, and this was taken into account when making the rating[32]. But besides the general world rankings, there are also rankings for specific categories. By advancing in these specific categories, universities are able to achieve the project's aims.

Another university ranking system is THE BRICS & Emerging Economies Rankings (a rating of universities in the BRICS countries and governments with developing economies). In 2014, only two Russian universities made it on the list (MSU and SPSU); however, as a result of the additional funding, in 2015, there were 7 Russian universities on the list, including some of the participants of the 5-100 Project: MEPhl (13th place), NSU (34), MIPT (69), and MSTU (90). THE BRICS generated a constantly updated ranking for 2016, in which there are more universities involved in the program: SPBPU (18), TPU (20), MEPhl (down to 26), KFU (31), NSU (34), MSTU (up to 57), TSU (87), MIPT (93), MISIS (99), and UNN (193), which appeared in the lists for the first time.

Quacquarelli Symonds

Moving forward, the QS rankings had some subjective challenges. All the universities participating in the project were far from being in the first 100 in the QS World University Rankings. NSU and MSTU were in the 300-400 list, and the others, even further. Regardless, according to QS, NSU and MIPT were now in the top ten best universities in the Emerging Europe and Central Asia 2015/2016.

Academic Ranking of World Universities

The Academic Ranking of World Universities (ARWU) is based mainly on universities where the graduates or staff are Nobel Laureates or have received the Fields Medal, as well as on how frequently the university's researchers are cited by others. In 2015, MSU was in 86th place, making it in the top 100.

== Other indicators ==
Round University Ranking (RUR) is also a ranking for universities, but was not mentioned in President Putin's statement. According to Thomson Reuters media company, ten Russian universities were placed in the top 200 for best quality of teaching. More than half of these were participants of the project: MSTU (106th place), People's Friendship University (112), TSU (131), UNN (135), MIPT (143) and TPU (179).

Although the universities were still far from their goal, it was clear that there were shifts in the rankings since the start of the project in 2013. In two years, the number of publications in two International Databases Web of Science and Scopus doubled, while the number of citations had increased by 160%. Deputy Prime Minister Olga Golodets believed Russian universities were amongst the leaders in education worldwide in terms of intensity and advancement. Ben Sauter, the head of research at QS, also acknowledged the effort put in by Russian universities in 2014.

== Road map and university achievements ==
1. Involvement of young researchers and teaching staff, with experience working in research and teaching areas at leading international and Russian universities and scientific organisations.
2. Creating joint educational programs with leading international and Russian universities and scientific organisations.
3. Attracting foreign students to study at Russian universities, including through joint educational programs with international universities.
4. Conducting fundamental and applied scientific research together with Russian and international scientific organisations.

— «Road Map», published on the project's website, based on which the universities can prepare their own development plans.

One of the important objectives for the universities involved was to attract international students and lecturers (at least 15% and 10% respectively). The percentage of overseas students can significantly differ even amongst universities in the same region. For example, at Tomsk Polytechnical University, there were about 25% international students, while at Tomsk State University only 9%. In general, these students are usually from former Soviet republics. According to 2014 data, ITMO University had more than 900 international students enrolled – around 6.5% of all students.

The universities participated in student and teacher exchange programs. Some were funded by the Center of International Mobility and DAAD. For example, ITMO is a part of the Association of European Universities and the Baltic Sea Region University Network (BSRUN). HSE has around 30 double degree programs and around 70 partner universities around the world. Tomsk universities have signed contracts to work with the Vietnamese: TSU – with the Vietnamese National University in Hanoi, TSUAB – with the National Research University of Civil Engineering and TPU – with the Hanoi University of Science and Technology.

In order to attract international students, Novosibirsk State University launched master's programs in English. It developed its Mechanical and Mathematics Departments and its Department of Information Technology. URFU received around 760 million rubles in state subsidies and spent a great deal of it on internships and continued relationships with the Cambridge Center. Attention was also given to developing English educational programs, particularly Master's programs, and money was spent on grants for international undergraduate and master's students.

Universities tried to integrate into online education systems. In November 2015, four Russian Universities (MePhl, MISIS, ITMO and URFU) joined the international education project edX, created by the Massachusetts Institute of Technology and Harvard University.

The universities that participated in the program could set up a Chair based on institutes of the Russian Academy of Sciences. A consortium was created that merged the School of Natural Sciences with the School of Biomedicine at the Far Eastern University with the Scientific Institutes of the Far East branch of RAS.

The project also helped to build and open new campuses, for example at NSU and TPU.

The idea for businessmen to create a reserve of management institutions was announced at SPIEF 2015. It was supported by Vladimir Putin, who urged them to collaborate with universities and participate in their curriculum development.

Furthermore, the universities' attention was also focused on school education, and as a result, many universities have preparation courses. About 65% of school-aged children in Russia are involved in extra-curricular education, which is fully covered by the state. The 5-100 project gave special attention to those fields related to engineering and technology.

== Participation in events ==
Events were organised to allow participating universities to receive important information necessary for achieving their objectives, to network with leading professionals and look for new partners, to discuss current issues related to the project and share their experience.

In 2015, there were more than a dozen events in Russia and abroad with project participants. Among these were some particularly significant international events:

- International Conference "Education and global cities: prospects of BRICS"
- International forum "Academic Fundraising"
- International Educational Opportunities Exhibition (AULA) in Madrid
- European Association for International Education (EAIE) Annual Conference
- NAFSA: Association of International Educators Conferences & Expo
- Project 5-100 at the Krasnoyarsk Economic Forum
- Project 5-100 & QS Worldwide Seminar-Conference at UNN (in collaboration with QS Asia)
