= 2026 Krasnoyarsk Krai legislative election =

Regional legislative election in Russia

- 18–20 September 2026

All 52 seats in the Legislative Assembly 27 seats needed for a majority
- Turnout: 49.10% ▲8.38 pp
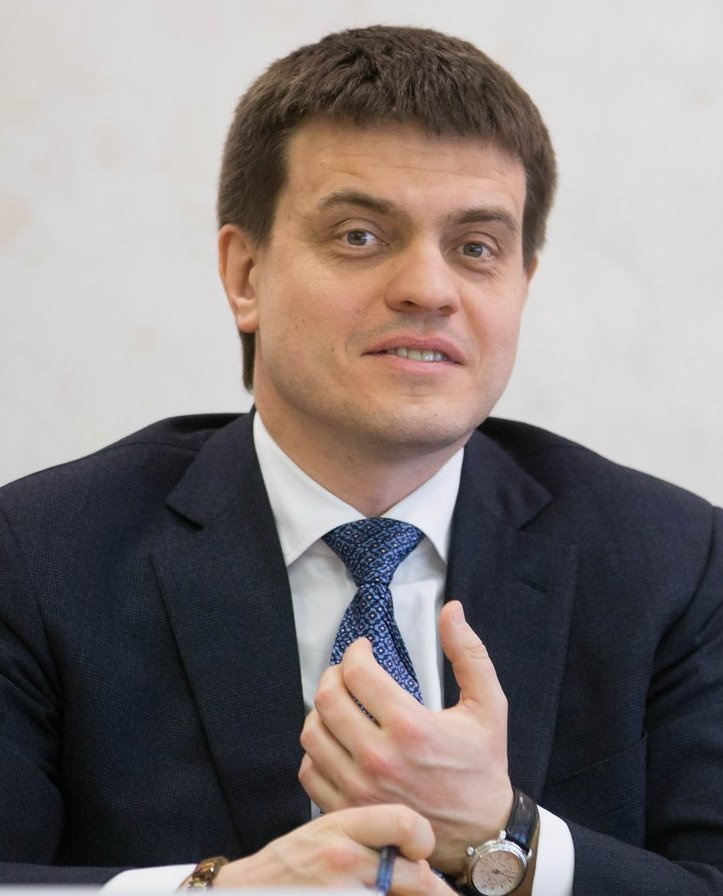

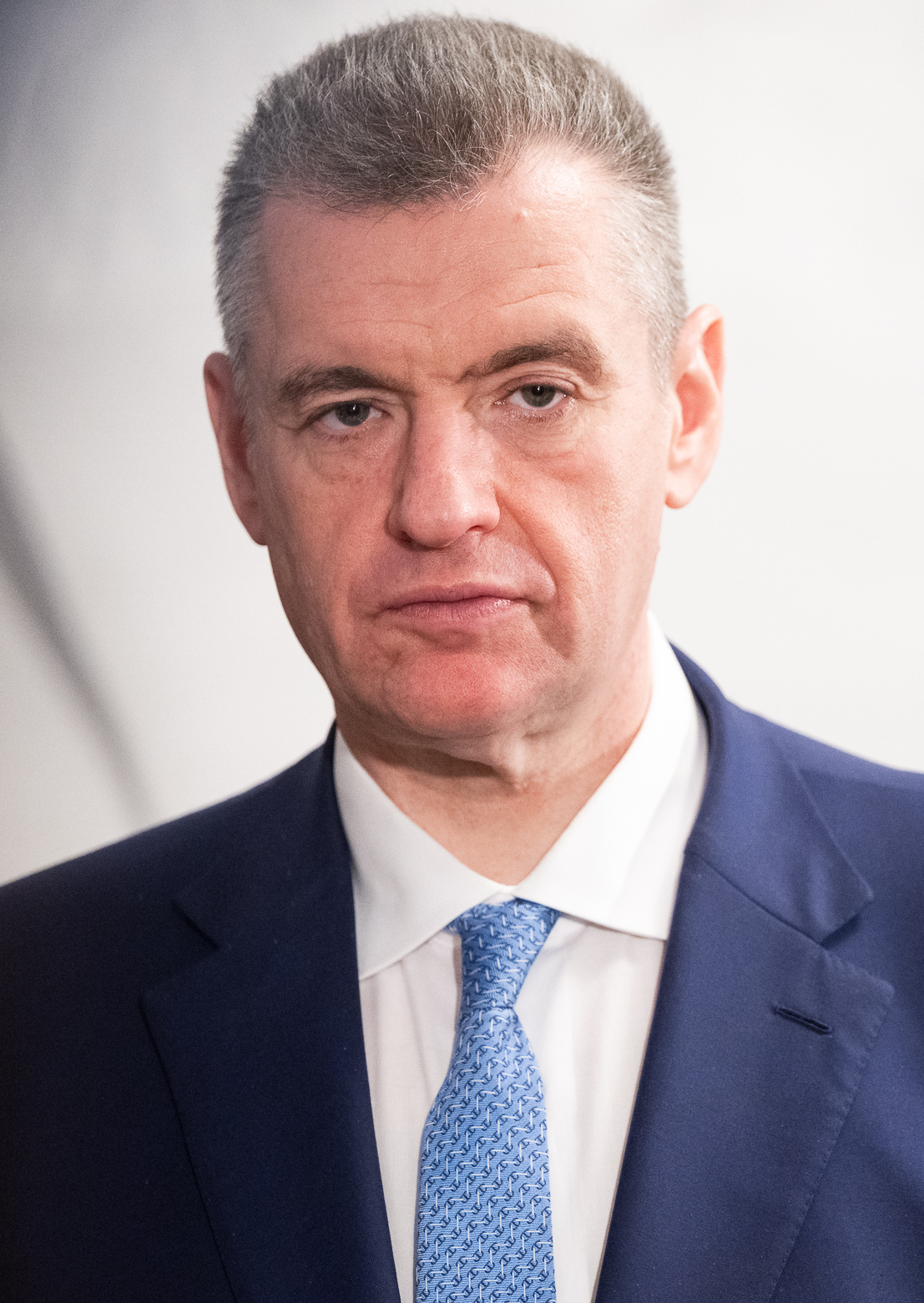
| | Majority party | Minority party | Third party |
|---|---|---|---|
| | | CPRF |
| Candidate | Mikhail Kotyukov | Yelena Rodikova | Leonid Slutsky |
| Party | United Russia | CPRF | LDPR |
| Last election | 31.69%, 34 seats | 21.77%, 8 seats | 14.70%, 4 seats |
| Seats won | 39 | 6 | 4 |
| Seat change | ▲5 | ▼2 | Steady |
| Popular vote | 398,711 | 190,026 | 152,838 |
| Percentage | 40.24% | 19.18% | 15.43% |
| Swing | ▲8.57 pp | ▼2.59 pp | ▲0.73 pp |
| | Fourth party | Fifth party | Sixth party |
| | NL | RPPSS | SR |
| Candidate | Natalya Karmanovskaya | Mikhail Orda | Maksim Markert |
| Party | New People | Party of Pensioners | A Just Russia |
| Last election | 7.96%, 2 seats | 4.36%, 0 seats | 7.10%, 1 seat |
| Seats won | 3 | 0 | 0 |
| Seat change | ▲1 | Steady | ▼1 |
| Popular vote | 114,242 | 36,773 | 36,139 |
| Percentage | 11.53% | 3.71% | 3.65% |
| Swing | ▲3.57 pp | ▼0.65 pp | ▼3.45 pp |
Chairman before election
Aleksey Dodatko
United Russia
Elected Chairman
Aleksey Dodatko
United Russia
Senator before election
Aleksandr Uss
United Russia
Senator after election
Sergey Ponomarenko
United Russia

The 2026 Legislative Assembly of Krasnoyarsk Krai election took place on 18–20 September 2026, on common election day, coinciding with the 2026 Russian legislative election. All 52 seats in the Legislative Assembly were up for re-election.

United Russia increased its majority in the Legislative Assembly, winning 40.2% of the vote and all 26 constituency seats. Communist Party of the Russian Federation lost two seats, while New People gained one more seat. A Just Russia and Russian Ecological Party "The Greens" lost significant vote shares and fell behind the 5% threshold.

== Electoral system ==
Under current election laws, the Legislative Assembly is elected for a term of five years, with parallel voting. 26 seats are elected by party-list proportional representation with a 5% electoral threshold, 22 members are elected in single-member constituencies by first-past-the-post voting, while 4 members are elected in two dual-member constituencies. Seats in the proportional part are allocated using the Imperiali quota, modified to ensure that every party list, which passes the threshold, receives at least one mandate.

== Candidates ==
=== Party lists ===
To register regional lists of candidates, parties need to collect 0.5% of signatures of all registered voters in Krasnoyarsk Krai.

The following parties were relieved from the necessity to collect signatures:

- United Russia
- Communist Party of the Russian Federation
- Liberal Democratic Party of Russia
- A Just Russia
- New People
- Russian Ecological Party "The Greens"
- Russian Party of Pensioners for Social Justice
- Communists of Russia
- Rodina

| № | Party | Krai-wide list | Candidates | Territorial groups | Status |
|---|---|---|---|---|---|
| 1 | New People | Natalya Karmanovskaya • Mikhail Martynyuk • Zakhar Yendzhiyevsky | 88 | 22 | Registered |
| 2 | Communist Party | Yelena Rodikova • Alan Yelbakiyev • Marina Bublikova | 108 | 22 | Registered |
| 3 | United Russia | Mikhail Kotyukov • Aleksey Dodatko • Sergey Vereshchagin | 113 | 22 | Registered |
| 4 | Rodina | Vitaly Telin • Andrey Fedotov | 75 | 22 | Registered |
| 5 | Party of Pensioners | Mikhail Orda • Valery Gusarov • Nikolay Gorkovenko | 77 | 22 | Registered |
| 6 | Liberal Democratic Party | Leonid Slutsky • Dmitry Novikov • Pavel Gagarkin | 104 | 22 | Registered |
| 7 | The Greens | Vladislav Aleynikov • Valery Timoshenko • Vladimir Makarov | 83 | 22 | Registered |
| 8 | A Just Russia | Maksim Markert • Aleksandr Lympio | 87 | 22 | Registered |

Communists of Russia, which participated in the last election, did not file.

=== Constituencies ===
22 single-mandate constituencies and 2 dual-mandate constituencies were formed in Krasnoyarsk Krai. The two dual-mandate constituencies were formed in Taymyrsky Dolgano-Nenetsky District (No.23) and Evenkiysky District (No.24) respectively to ensure representation for the former autonomous okrugs, notably these constituencies have significantly less voters (19 740 and 11 119 voters with single-mandate constituencies having on average 91 000 voters). To register candidates in constituencies need to collect 3% of signatures of registered voters in the constituency.

Number of candidates in constituencies
| Party | Candidates | |
| Party | Nominated | Registered |
|---|---|---|
| United Russia | 26 | 26 |
| Communist Party | 26 | 25 |
| Liberal Democratic Party | 24 | 23 |
| New People | 18 | 18 |
| A Just Russia | 24 | 23 |
| The Greens | 16 | 14 |
| Party of Pensioners | 25 | 25 |
| Rodina | 15 | 15 |
| Independent | 6 | 1 |
| Total | 180 | 170 |

== Results ==
=== Results by party lists ===
Summary of the 18–20 September 2026 Legislative Assembly of Krasnoyarsk Krai election results
| Party | Party list | | | | | Constituency | | Total | |
| Party | Votes | % | ±pp | Seats | +/– | Seats | +/– | Seats | +/– |
|---|---|---|---|---|---|---|---|---|---|
| United Russia | 398,711 | 40.24 | ▲8.57 | 13 | ▲2 | 26 | ▲3 | 39 | ▲5 |
| Communist Party | 190,026 | 19.18 | ▼2.59 | 6 | ▼1 | 0 | ▼1 | 6 | ▼2 |
| Liberal Democratic Party | 152,838 | 15.43 | ▲0.73 | 4 | Steady | 0 | Steady | 4 | Steady |
| New People | 114,242 | 11.53 | ▲3.57 | 3 | ▲1 | 0 | Steady | 3 | ▲1 |
| Party of Pensioners | 36,773 | 3.71 | ▼0.65 | 0 | Steady | 0 | Steady | 0 | Steady |
| A Just Russia | 36,139 | 3.65 | ▼3.45 | 0 | ▼1 | 0 | Steady | 0 | ▼1 |
| The Greens | 19,141 | 1.93 | ▼3.18 | 0 | ▼1 | 0 | Steady | 0 | ▼1 |
| Rodina | 11,596 | 1.17 | ▼0.12 | 0 | Steady | 0 | Steady | 0 | Steady |
| Independent | – | – | – | – | – | 0 | ▼2 | 0 | ▼2 |
| Invalid ballots | 31,366 | 3.17 | ▼0.17 | — | — | — | — | — | — |
| Total | 990,832 | 100.00 | — | 26 | Steady | 26 | Steady | 52 | Steady |
| Turnout | 990,832 | 49.10 | ▲8.38 | — | — | — | — | — | — |
| Registered voters | 2,018,108 | 100.00 | — | — | — | — | — | — | — |

Aleksey Dodatko (United Russia) was re-elected as Chairman of the Legislative Assembly. First Deputy Governor of Krasnoyarsk Krai Sergey Ponomarenko (United Russia) was appointed to the Federation Council, replacing incumbent Senator Aleksandr Uss (United Russia).

=== Results in constituencies ===
==== District 1 ====
Summary of the 18–20 September 2026 Legislative Assembly of Krasnoyarsk Krai election in Leninsky constituency No.1
| Candidate | Party | Votes | % |
|---|---|---|---|
| Vladimir Chashchin (incumbent) | United Russia | 12,019 | 29.53% |
| Ivan Petrov | Liberal Democratic Party | 10,379 | 25.50% |
| Yelena Rodikova | Communist Party | 6,269 | 15.40% |
| Ilya Arkhipov | New People | 5,081 | 12.48% |
| Yevgeny Boyev | A Just Russia | 1,909 | 4.69% |
| Nikolay Gorkovenko | Party of Pensioners | 1,784 | 4.38% |
| Semyon Karayev | The Greens | 1,055 | 2.59% |
| Vyacheslav Gordeyev | Rodina | 797 | 1.96% |
| Total | | 40,699 | 100% |

==== District 2 ====
Summary of the 18–20 September 2026 Legislative Assembly of Krasnoyarsk Krai election in Kirovsky constituency No.2
| Candidate | Party | Votes | % |
|---|---|---|---|
| Artemy Lyubushkin | United Russia | 11,631 | 28.97% |
| Maksim Plyutov | Liberal Democratic Party | 7,764 | 19.34% |
| Aleksandr Leshenkov | Communist Party | 6,784 | 16.90% |
| Anastasia Novikova | New People | 5,067 | 12.62% |
| Natalya Zhelobotkina | Party of Pensioners | 2,809 | 7.00% |
| Pavel Medvedenko | A Just Russia | 2,119 | 5.28% |
| Dmitry Kryazhev | The Greens | 1,500 | 3.74% |
| Marina Rozhkova | Rodina | 1,020 | 2.54% |
| Total | | 40,149 | 100% |

==== District 3 ====
Summary of the 18–20 September 2026 Legislative Assembly of Krasnoyarsk Krai election in Sverdlovsky constituency No.3
| Candidate | Party | Votes | % |
|---|---|---|---|
| Ilya Zaytsev (incumbent) | United Russia | 23,711 | 50.21% |
| Sergey Khadzhegurov | Communist Party | 6,739 | 14.27% |
| Mikhail Martynyuk | New People | 6,006 | 12.72% |
| Aleksandr Levy | Liberal Democratic Party | 4,546 | 9.63% |
| Dmitry Katyshev | Party of Pensioners | 2,431 | 5.15% |
| Artyom Orlov | A Just Russia | 2,310 | 4.89% |
| Total | | 47,227 | 100% |

==== District 4 ====
Summary of the 18–20 September 2026 Legislative Assembly of Krasnoyarsk Krai election in Oktyabrsky constituency No.4
| Candidate | Party | Votes | % |
|---|---|---|---|
| Irina Ivanova | United Russia | 16,615 | 37.07% |
| Sergey Yeliseyev | Communist Party | 8,089 | 18.05% |
| Vyacheslav Dyukov | The Greens | 5,316 | 11.86% |
| Semyon Kolesnikov | Liberal Democratic Party | 4,488 | 10.01% |
| German Tyunyayev | New People | 3,901 | 8.70% |
| Aleksandr Sudakov | Party of Pensioners | 2,035 | 4.54% |
| Viktor Shnitko | A Just Russia | 1,715 | 3.83% |
| Valery Osipov | Rodina | 992 | 2.21% |
| Total | | 44,817 | 100% |

==== District 5 ====
Summary of the 18–20 September 2026 Legislative Assembly of Krasnoyarsk Krai election in Zheleznodorozhny constituency No.5
| Candidate | Party | Votes | % |
|---|---|---|---|
| Vitaly Drozdov (incumbent) | United Russia | 13,598 | 32.92% |
| Nikita Sarov | Communist Party | 6,571 | 15.91% |
| Artyom Shishkin | New People | 6,152 | 14.89% |
| Aleksey Chaplinsky | Liberal Democratic Party | 4,256 | 10.30% |
| Yevgeny Pashchenko | A Just Russia | 3,534 | 8.56% |
| Galina Dubovitskaya | Party of Pensioners | 3,000 | 7.26% |
| Pavel Goponenko | The Greens | 2,082 | 5.04% |
| Igor Sorokin | Rodina | 708 | 1.71% |
| Total | | 41,309 | 100% |

==== District 6 ====
Summary of the 18–20 September 2026 Legislative Assembly of Krasnoyarsk Krai election in Solnechny constituency No.6
| Candidate | Party | Votes | % |
|---|---|---|---|
| Dmitry Dmitriyev (incumbent) | United Russia | 16,781 | 38.38% |
| Oleg Panchenko | Liberal Democratic Party | 6,831 | 15.62% |
| Denis Zvyagin | Communist Party | 6,725 | 15.38% |
| Konstantin Bazarny | New People | 6,443 | 14.73% |
| Vladimir Chernyshev | A Just Russia | 2,060 | 4.71% |
| Leonid Zolnikov | Party of Pensioners | 1,563 | 3.57% |
| Lolita Zagorulko | The Greens | 1,533 | 3.51% |
| Aziz Kerimov | Rodina | 464 | 1.06% |
| Total | | 43,728 | 100% |

==== District 7 ====
Summary of the 18–20 September 2026 Legislative Assembly of Krasnoyarsk Krai election in Sovetsky constituency No.7
| Candidate | Party | Votes | % |
|---|---|---|---|
| Yelena Penzina (incumbent) | United Russia | 17,301 | 41.03% |
| Semyon Sendersky | Liberal Democratic Party | 7,842 | 18.60% |
| Denis Shinkorenko | Communist Party | 6,211 | 14.73% |
| Sergey Zhilyakov | New People | 4,368 | 10.36% |
| Dmitry Ivanov | The Greens | 1,608 | 3.81% |
| Nikolay Pavlyuk | A Just Russia | 1,448 | 3.43% |
| Valery Gusarov | Party of Pensioners | 1,441 | 3.42% |
| Aleksandr Demoyev | Rodina | 704 | 1.67% |
| Total | | 42,171 | 100% |

==== District 8 ====
Summary of the 18–20 September 2026 Legislative Assembly of Krasnoyarsk Krai election in Yemelyanovsky constituency No.8
| Candidate | Party | Votes | % |
|---|---|---|---|
| Yevgeny Garin (incumbent) | United Russia | 14,677 | 31.49% |
| Yulia Volkova | Communist Party | 10,731 | 23.03% |
| Yury Bryukhovetsky | Liberal Democratic Party | 5,530 | 11.87% |
| Zhan Ignatyev | New People | 5,130 | 11.01% |
| Aleksandr Shadrin | A Just Russia | 3,067 | 6.58% |
| Viktoria Kefer | The Greens | 2,149 | 4.61% |
| Andrey Denisov | Party of Pensioners | 2,106 | 4.52% |
| Mikhail Uzlov | Rodina | 1,336 | 2.87% |
| Total | | 46,603 | 100% |

==== District 9 ====
Summary of the 18–20 September 2026 Legislative Assembly of Krasnoyarsk Krai election in Sosnovoborsky constituency No.9
| Candidate | Party | Votes | % |
|---|---|---|---|
| Aleksandr Novikov (incumbent) | United Russia | 15,681 | 32.94% |
| Nikolay Sattarov | Communist Party | 8,703 | 18.28% |
| Pavel Gagarkin | Liberal Democratic Party | 6,727 | 14.13% |
| Olga Frizorger | New People | 5,628 | 11.82% |
| Dmitry Barkhatov | Party of Pensioners | 3,355 | 7.05% |
| Igor Bolbat | A Just Russia | 2,300 | 4.83% |
| Tatyana Larina | The Greens | 2,183 | 4.59% |
| Vitaly Telin | Rodina | 829 | 1.74% |
| Total | | 47,602 | 100% |

==== District 10 ====
Summary of the 18–20 September 2026 Legislative Assembly of Krasnoyarsk Krai election in Zheleznogorsky constituency No.10
| Candidate | Party | Votes | % |
|---|---|---|---|
| Dmitry Kolupayev | United Russia | 15,671 | 31.46% |
| Oleg Tokarev | Communist Party | 8,377 | 16.82% |
| Roman Kovalyov | New People | 7,431 | 14.92% |
| Ivan Davydov | Liberal Democratic Party | 6,796 | 13.64% |
| Artur Goncharov | A Just Russia | 4,663 | 9.36% |
| Andrey Safonov | Party of Pensioners | 3,455 | 6.94% |
| Aleksandr Shatilov | Rodina | 987 | 1.98% |
| Total | | 49,810 | 100% |

==== District 11 ====
Summary of the 18–20 September 2026 Legislative Assembly of Krasnoyarsk Krai election in Achinsky constituency No.11
| Candidate | Party | Votes | % |
|---|---|---|---|
| Sergey Nikitin | United Russia | 16,071 | 31.69% |
| Dmitry Kulikov | Liberal Democratic Party | 8,429 | 16.62% |
| Ilya Antyshev | Communist Party | 8,418 | 16.60% |
| Anastasia Zvereva | New People | 6,433 | 12.68% |
| Yevgeny Kiriyenko | Party of Pensioners | 4,073 | 8.03% |
| Vladimir Ozeredenko | A Just Russia | 3,114 | 6.14% |
| Dmitry Romanchik | Rodina | 1,610 | 3.17% |
| Total | | 50,716 | 100% |

==== District 12 ====
Summary of the 18–20 September 2026 Legislative Assembly of Krasnoyarsk Krai election in Nazarovsky constituency No.12
| Candidate | Party | Votes | % |
|---|---|---|---|
| Galina Ampilogova | United Russia | 16,146 | 37.62% |
| Valery Isayev | Communist Party | 12,261 | 28.56% |
| Anna Yegorova | Liberal Democratic Party | 3,564 | 8.30% |
| Denis Tikhonov | Rodina | 3,125 | 7.28% |
| Marina Ostrovskaya | New People | 3,062 | 7.13% |
| Tatyana Kondratyuk | Party of Pensioners | 1,468 | 3.42% |
| Konstantin Belyayev | The Greens | 1,451 | 3.38% |
| Total | | 42,924 | 100% |

==== District 13 ====
Summary of the 18–20 September 2026 Legislative Assembly of Krasnoyarsk Krai election in Sharypovsky constituency No.13
| Candidate | Party | Votes | % |
|---|---|---|---|
| Boris Melnichenko (incumbent) | United Russia | 24,614 | 47.36% |
| Tatyana Ivanets | Communist Party | 7,270 | 13.99% |
| Aleksandr Kiselev | Liberal Democratic Party | 7,092 | 13.65% |
| Darya Gerbel | A Just Russia | 4,037 | 7.77% |
| Vladimir Danilenko | Party of Pensioners | 3,921 | 7.54% |
| Dmitry Merkulov | Rodina | 2,753 | 5.30% |
| Total | | 51,970 | 100% |

==== District 14 ====
Summary of the 18–20 September 2026 Legislative Assembly of Krasnoyarsk Krai election in Minusinsky constituency No.14
| Candidate | Party | Votes | % |
|---|---|---|---|
| Vladislav Zyryanov (incumbent) | United Russia | 28,138 | 55.38% |
| Marina Bublikova | Communist Party | 7,739 | 15.23% |
| Artyom Olemskoy | Liberal Democratic Party | 4,269 | 8.40% |
| Yulia Sidichenko | New People | 2,548 | 5.01% |
| Alyona Bakaykina | A Just Russia | 2,402 | 4.73% |
| Yelena Bannikova | Party of Pensioners | 1,655 | 3.26% |
| Anatoly Skirpalshchikov | The Greens | 1,185 | 2.33% |
| Alisa Skvortsova | Rodina | 895 | 1.76% |
| Total | | 50,809 | 100% |

==== District 15 ====
Summary of the 18–20 September 2026 Legislative Assembly of Krasnoyarsk Krai election in Kuraginsky constituency No.15
| Candidate | Party | Votes | % |
|---|---|---|---|
| Yegor Vasilyev (incumbent) | United Russia | 18,366 | 44.04% |
| Vladimir Wachtel | Communist Party | 10,924 | 26.20% |
| Sergey Savchenko | Liberal Democratic Party | 4,395 | 10.54% |
| Yevgenia Romanikhina | New People | 3,586 | 8.60% |
| Ivan Schmidt | Party of Pensioners | 2,335 | 5.60% |
| Total | | 41,701 | 100% |

==== District 16 ====
Summary of the 18–20 September 2026 Legislative Assembly of Krasnoyarsk Krai election in Rybinsky constituency No.16
| Candidate | Party | Votes | % |
|---|---|---|---|
| Sergey Filimonov (incumbent) | United Russia | 12,927 | 31.11% |
| Maksim Zolotukhin | Communist Party | 11,325 | 27.26% |
| Artyom Artemyev | New People | 4,729 | 11.38% |
| Andrey Pakharenko | Liberal Democratic Party | 3,968 | 9.55% |
| Anastasia Shulgina | Party of Pensioners | 3,590 | 8.64% |
| Anatoly Lependin | A Just Russia | 3,085 | 7.42% |
| Total | | 41,552 | 100% |

==== District 17 ====
Summary of the 18–20 September 2026 Legislative Assembly of Krasnoyarsk Krai election in Kansky constituency No.17
| Candidate | Party | Votes | % |
|---|---|---|---|
| Irina Avdoshkevich | United Russia | 15,099 | 39.15% |
| Olga Sivayeva | Communist Party | 7,192 | 18.65% |
| Vladimir Makarov | The Greens | 4,563 | 11.83% |
| Anna Loginova | New People | 4,379 | 11.35% |
| Alyona Borisevich | Party of Pensioners | 2,240 | 5.81% |
| Tatyana Tarasova | A Just Russia | 2,090 | 5.42% |
| Sergey Sergeyev | Rodina | 939 | 2.43% |
| Total | | 38,569 | 100% |

==== District 18 ====
Summary of the 18–20 September 2026 Legislative Assembly of Krasnoyarsk Krai election in Uyarsky constituency No.18
| Candidate | Party | Votes | % |
|---|---|---|---|
| Viktor Kardashov | United Russia | 12,468 | 28.27% |
| Pavel Vergeychik | Communist Party | 8,458 | 19.18% |
| Denis Zhukov | Liberal Democratic Party | 5,873 | 13.31% |
| Aleksey Zhivotyagin | New People | 4,669 | 10.59% |
| Irina Kraynik | A Just Russia | 2,884 | 6.54% |
| Vladimir Moiseyev | Party of Pensioners | 2,562 | 5.81% |
| Denis Vangin | Rodina | 2,212 | 5.01% |
| Maria Kolesnikova | The Greens | 2,138 | 4.85% |
| Total | | 44,109 | 100% |

==== District 19 ====
Summary of the 18–20 September 2026 Legislative Assembly of Krasnoyarsk Krai election in Kezhemsky constituency No.19
| Candidate | Party | Votes | % |
|---|---|---|---|
| Yekaterina Udelko (incumbent) | United Russia | 12,571 | 29.78% |
| Raushan Zharkombayev | Communist Party | 8,354 | 19.79% |
| Sergey Grigoryev | Liberal Democratic Party | 6,025 | 14.27% |
| Mikhail Avdonin | New People | 4,449 | 10.54% |
| Aleksandr Romanov | A Just Russia | 3,093 | 7.33% |
| Aleksandr Kolokoltsev | Party of Pensioners | 3,032 | 7.18% |
| Gennady Bitinsh | The Greens | 2,657 | 6.29% |
| Total | | 42,215 | 100% |

==== District 20 ====
Summary of the 18–20 September 2026 Legislative Assembly of Krasnoyarsk Krai election in Yeniseysky constituency No.20
| Candidate | Party | Votes | % |
|---|---|---|---|
| Sergey Ponomarenko | United Russia | 12,376 | 35.50% |
| Viktor Wagner | Liberal Democratic Party | 8,380 | 24.04% |
| Artyom Novikov | Communist Party | 5,692 | 16.33% |
| Nikolay Bukharev | Party of Pensioners | 4,385 | 12.58% |
| Andrey Zhirenkov | A Just Russia | 2,207 | 6.33% |
| Total | | 34,861 | 100% |

==== District 21 ====
Summary of the 18–20 September 2026 Legislative Assembly of Krasnoyarsk Krai election in Norilsky constituency No.21
| Candidate | Party | Votes | % |
|---|---|---|---|
| Dmitry Sviridov | United Russia | 25,493 | 70.89% |
| Pavel Semizorov | Liberal Democratic Party | 5,023 | 13.97% |
| Vladimir Kudritsky | A Just Russia | 1,593 | 4.43% |
| Natalya Telnykh | Communist Party | 1,411 | 3.92% |
| Erzhena Zhmakova | Party of Pensioners | 1,241 | 3.45% |
| Gleb Shin | The Greens | 855 | 2.38% |
| Total | | 35,962 | 100% |

==== District 22 ====
Summary of the 18–20 September 2026 Legislative Assembly of Krasnoyarsk Krai election in Talnakhsky constituency No.22
| Candidate | Party | Votes | % |
|---|---|---|---|
| Irina Subocheva | United Russia | 21,390 | 60.87% |
| Svetlana Blinova | Liberal Democratic Party | 4,725 | 13.45% |
| Svetlana Sedova | Communist Party | 4,309 | 12.26% |
| Aleksandr Bas | A Just Russia | 3,754 | 10.68% |
| Total | | 35,141 | 100% |

==== District 23 ====
Summary of the 18–20 September 2026 Legislative Assembly of Krasnoyarsk Krai election in Taymyrsky constituency No.23
| Candidate | Party | Votes | % |
|---|---|---|---|
| Sergey Sizonenko (incumbent) | United Russia | 2,484 | 26.82% |
| Valery Vengo (incumbent) | United Russia | 2,158 | 23.30% |
| Yevgeny Baranov | Communist Party | 927 | 10.01% |
| Aleksandr Belyayev | Liberal Democratic Party | 817 | 8.82% |
| Nadezhda Kotelnikova | Communist Party | 625 | 6.75% |
| Sergey Bil | A Just Russia | 478 | 5.16% |
| Aleksandr Batashov | Party of Pensioners | 391 | 4.22% |
| Dmitry Timofeyev | A Just Russia | 372 | 4.02% |
| Aleksey Yakovlev | Party of Pensioners | 336 | 3.63% |
| Total | | 9,261 | 100% |

==== District 24 ====
Summary of the 18–20 September 2026 Legislative Assembly of Krasnoyarsk Krai election in Evenkiysky constituency No.24
| Candidate | Party | Votes | % |
|---|---|---|---|
| Aleksandr Zarubin | United Russia | 1,698 | 30.03% |
| Valery Farukshin (incumbent) | United Russia | 1,209 | 21.38% |
| Andrey Cherkasov | Independent | 967 | 17.10% |
| Aleksey Botulu | A Just Russia | 788 | 13.94% |
| Anatoly Shapovalov | Communist Party | 327 | 5.78% |
| Lyudmila Borisova | Party of Pensioners | 132 | 2.33% |
| Nikolay Golin | Liberal Democratic Party | 114 | 2.02% |
| Leonid Rozhdestvensky | Party of Pensioners | 62 | 1.10% |
| Total | | 5,654 | 100% |

=== Members ===
Incumbent deputies are highlighted with bold, elected members who declined to take a seat are marked with ~~strikethrough~~.

Constituency
| No. | Member | Party |
|---|---|---|
| 1 | Vladimir Chashchin | United Russia |
| 2 | Artemy Lyubushkin | United Russia |
| 3 | Ilya Zaytsev | United Russia |
| 4 | Irina Ivanova | United Russia |
| 5 | Vitaly Drozdov | United Russia |
| 6 | Dmitry Dmitriyev | United Russia |
| 7 | Yelena Penzina | United Russia |
| 8 | Yevgeny Garin | United Russia |
| 9 | Aleksandr Novikov | United Russia |
| 10 | Dmitry Kolupayev | United Russia |
| 11 | Sergey Nikitin | United Russia |
| 12 | Galina Ampilogova | United Russia |
| 13 | Boris Melnichenko | United Russia |
| 14 | Vladislav Zyryanov | United Russia |
| 15 | Yegor Vasilyev | United Russia |
| 16 | Sergey Filimonov | United Russia |
| 17 | Irina Avdoshkevich | United Russia |
| 18 | Viktor Kardashov | United Russia |
| 19 | Yekaterina Udelko | United Russia |
| 20 | Sergey Ponomarenko | United Russia |
| 21 | Dmitry Sviridov | United Russia |
| 22 | Irina Subocheva | United Russia |
| 23 | Sergey Sizonenko | United Russia |
| 23 | Valery Vengo | United Russia |
| 24 | Aleksandr Zarubin | United Russia |
| 24 | Valery Farukshin | United Russia |

Party lists
| Member | Party |
|---|---|
| ~~Mikhail Kotyukov~~ | United Russia |
| Aleksey Dodatko | United Russia |
| ~~Sergey Vereshchagin~~ | United Russia |
| Yulia Kamenskaya | United Russia |
| Tatyana Nazarova | United Russia |
| Semyon Svetilnikov | United Russia |
| Viktor Simchuk | United Russia |
| Vera Oskina | United Russia |
| Marina Filippova | United Russia |
| Sergey Zyablov | United Russia |
| Vladimir Demidov | United Russia |
| ~~Aleksandr Pestryakov~~ | United Russia |
| Yelena Tumanova | United Russia |
| Aleksey Kulesh | United Russia |
| Sergey Gorbunov | United Russia |
| Yevgeny Borisevich | United Russia |
| Yelena Rodikova | Communist Party |
| Alan Yelbakiyev | Communist Party |
| ~~Marina Bublikova~~ | Communist Party |
| Vladimir Wachtel | Communist Party |
| Maksim Zolotukhin | Communist Party |
| Olga Sivayeva | Communist Party |
| Andrey Novak | Communist Party |
| ~~Leonid Slutsky~~ | Liberal Democratic Party |
| ~~Dmitry Novikov~~ | Liberal Democratic Party |
| Pavel Gagarkin | Liberal Democratic Party |
| Pavel Semizorov | Liberal Democratic Party |
| Ivan Petrov | Liberal Democratic Party |
| Maksim Plyutov | Liberal Democratic Party |
| Natalya Karmanovskaya | New People |
| Mikhail Martynyuk | New People |
| Zakhar Yendzhiyevsky | New People |

== See also ==
- 2026 Russian regional elections
