= Unified State Exam =

Russian university entrance examination

Official logo of the Unified State Exam (EGE) with the slogan "The Choice of the Future!" (Russia, 2024).

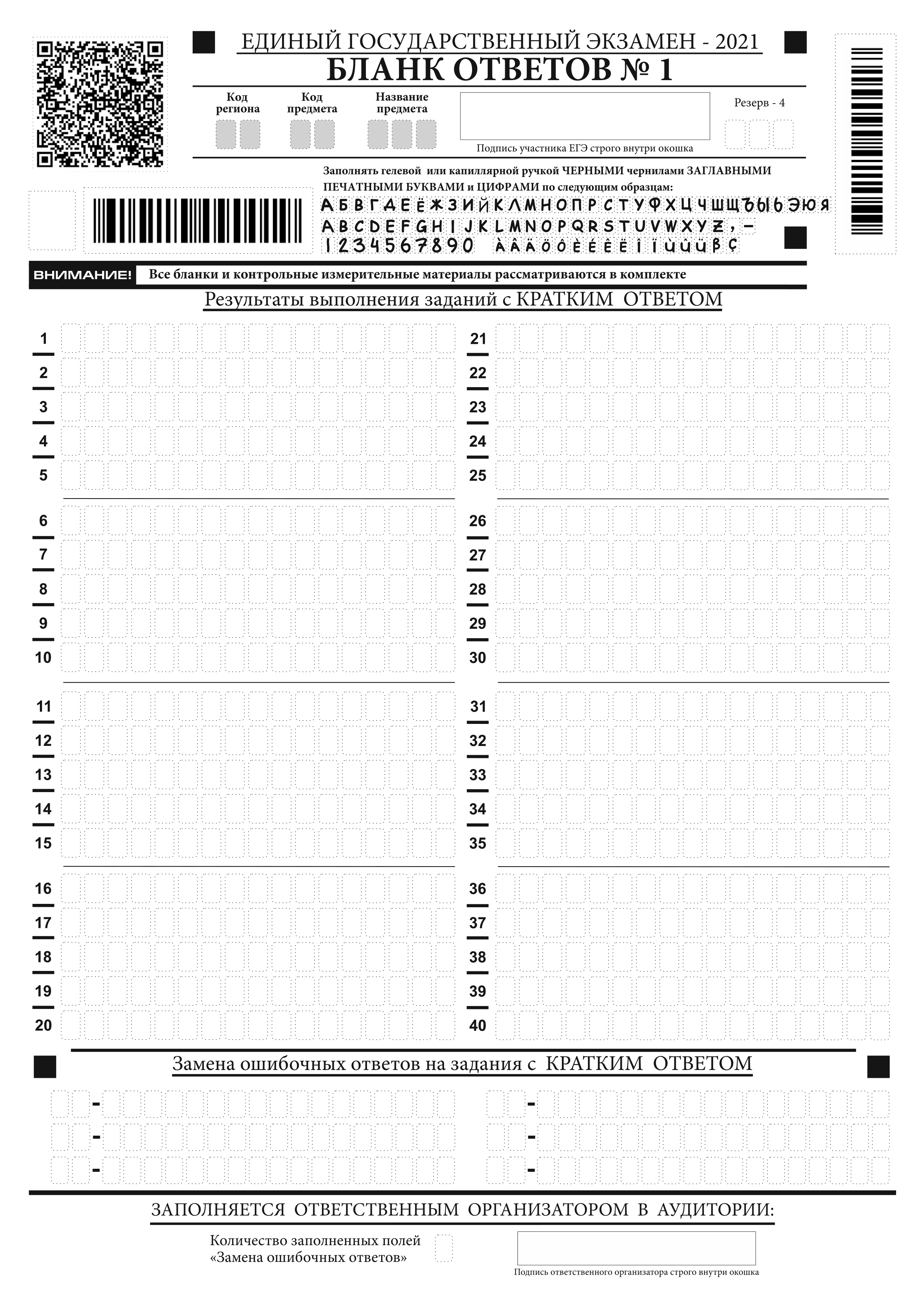
USE answer sheet No. 1

The Unified State Exam (Russian: Единый государственный экзамен, ЕГЭ, Yedinyy gosudarstvennyy ekzamen, YeGE) is a series of mandatory, centralized examinations conducted across the Russian Federation in secondary educational institutions, such as schools, lyceums, and gymnasiums. It serves as a form of State Final Certification (GIA) for educational programs of secondary general education. The USE simultaneously acts as both a school graduation examination and an entrance examination for higher education institutions, ensuring that students meet standardized educational requirements. The USE in Russian language and mathematics is obligatory; that means that every student must achieve the necessary results in these subjects to enter any Russian university or obtain a high school diploma.

Prior to 2013 it also served as an entrance examination for secondary vocational education institutions (sredniye spetsial’nyye uchebnyye zavedeniya, or SSUZy). However, a new education law annulled this provision. The exam employs standardized tasks and unified evaluation methods across Russia. Since 2009, the USE has been the only form of high school graduation exam and the primary form of university entrance exam. Students are allowed to retake the USE in subsequent years if necessary, providing them with additional opportunities to improve their scores and qualifications.

== History ==
The USE was introduced in Russia in 2001 first as an educational experiment, initially held in a few regions of Russia: Chuvashia, Mari El, Yakutia, as well as in Samara, and Rostov Oblasts, covering eight subjects. The first experimental examination was only held by the eight general classes. In 2002 this experiment expanded to 16 regions of Russia, and further to 47 regions in 2003. By 2006, approximately 950,000 school graduates from 79 regions participated in the USE, and in 2008, over one million students took the exam. Initially, the list of subjects varied by region.

The list of schools and classes to take part in the USE in 2001–2008 was determined by local public education authorities in the regions of Russia. Presently, the USE is administered by the Ministry of Education and Science together with the regional and local public education authorities.

The USE's development was led by Vladimir Filippov, while its implementation was overseen by Vladimir Khlebnikov. The Federal Service for Supervision in Education and Science organizes the exam in collaboration with regional education authorities.

== Subjects offered ==
The USE is conducted in the following subjects:

- Russian language
- Mathematics (basic)
- Mathematics (advanced)
- Foreign languages (English, German, French, Spanish, Chinese)
- Physics
- Chemistry
- Biology
- Geography
- Literature
- History
- Social studies
- Computer science.

Russian language and mathematics are mandatory for all students. A student must select basic or advanced mathematics and a minimum of 2 other subjects (1 if taking advanced mathematics).

== Structure and Content ==
The USE's tasks are known as Control and Measuring Materials (Kontrol’no-Izmerytel’nyye Materialy, KIMs), developed by the Federal Institute of Pedagogical Measurements. These tasks have evolved over time:

=== Previous Format ===
- Part A: Multiple-choice questions (choose one answer from four options).
- Part B: Short-answer questions requiring brief responses, such as words or numbers.
- Part C: Open-ended questions, such as problem-solving, essay writing, or argumentation, evaluated by regional examiners.

=== Current Format ===
Since the 2015/2016 academic year, multiple-choice questions (Part A) have been removed from all subjects. Tasks now focus on short answers (Part I) and detailed responses (Part II).

Part I contains tasks in which the student must give a short written answer, usually consisting of several letters or numbers.

Part II contains one or more tasks requiring the student to use creativity. Depending on the subject, tasks can include mathematical exercises, essays or questions requiring argumentative responses. Unlike part I, which is computer corrected, part II is evaluated by subject matter experts from the regional examination committee.

While the initial grading may differ between subjects, a standardized 100-point scale is used for both graduation and university application purposes. The structure and content of KIMs are governed by three documents approved annually by Rosobrnadzor: the content codifier, exam specifications, and a demonstration version of the exam.

The table provides the duration of exams, the number of tasks, and the maximum primary score for the 2024 USE. It also includes the minimum number of points (the lower boundary of a satisfactory grade), which is determined in test points.

Subject	Duration (minutes)	Part 1 Tasks	Part 2 Tasks	Maximum Primary Score	Minimum Test Score for Diploma/University admission	Minimum Test Score for Admission to Ministry of Education Supervised Universities
Russian language	210	26	1	50	24/36	40
Mathematics (Basic)	180	21	0	21	7 (primary points)	Not considered for university admission
Mathematics (Advanced)	235	12	7	32	27	40
Physics	235	20	6	45	36	39
Chemistry	210	28	6	56	36	39
Computer science	235	26	0	29	40	46
Biology	235	21	7	57	36	40
History	210	12	9	42	32	36
Geography	180	21	8	38	37	40
English language	190+17	36	6	82	22	30
German language	190+17	36	6	82	22	30
French language	190+17	36	6	82	22	30
Spanish language	190+17	36	6	82	22	30
Social studies	210	16	9	58	42	45
Literature	235	6	5	48	32	40

== Mathematics levels ==
Since 2015, the mathematics exam has been divided into two levels:

- Basic Level: Required for students not pursuing higher education or applying to universities where mathematics is not a subject of admission.
- Advanced Level: Required for students applying to universities where mathematics is a key subject in the entrance exams.

== Examination Periods and Dates ==
The Unified State Exam (USE) follows a structured schedule each year, consisting of multiple periods to accommodate different student needs. A proof of valid reasons, such as illness or other circumstances, is required for eligibility in special testing periods. However, the absolute majority of students take their exams during the main period. The key examination periods include:

- Early Period (March – April) – Reserved for Olympiad participants, athletes, and other students who are unable to attend the main session.
- Main Period (Late May – June) – The primary examination window for all high school graduates.
- Additional Testing Days – Available for students who miss their exams due to illness, valid personal circumstances, or overlapping elective exam dates.
- Retake Period (July) – Provides students with an opportunity to improve their scores or meet the minimum requirements for university admission.
- Supplementary Period (September) – Intended for students who did not pass the mandatory exams required for a high school diploma.

Below is the specific schedule for the 2026 examination period.

USE Periods (2026)
Period	Dates (2026)	Eligible Participants
Early Period	March 20 – April 20, 2026	Olympiad winners, athletes, and students unable to attend the main period for valid reasons.
Main Period	June 1 – July 9, 2026	All high school graduates.
Additional Testing Days	June 22 – 25, 2026	Students who missed exams due to illness, other valid circumstances, or scheduling conflicts.
Retake Period	July 8 – 9, 2026	Students retaking exams to improve scores or fulfill diploma/university admission requirements.
Supplementary Period	September 4 – 25, 2026	Students retaking mandatory exams (Russian or Mathematics) for high school diploma requirements.

USE Exam Schedule by Subject (2025)
Subject	Main Period	Early Period	Retake Period	Supplementary Period
Russian Language	May 30	March 25, April 14	July 3	September 4, September 23
Mathematics (Basic)	May 27	March 28, April 17	July 4	September 8, September 23
Mathematics (Advanced)	May 27	March 28, April 17	July 4	September 8, September 23
Geography	June 5	March 21, April 21	July 4	–
Literature	May 23	March 21, April 18	July 4	–
History	June 2	April 11, April 21	July 4	–
Social Studies	June 2	April 8, April 18	July 3	–
Biology	June 5	April 1, April 18	July 4	–
Physics	June 2	April 1, April 18	July 3	–
Chemistry	May 23	April 11, April 21	July 3	–
Computer Science	June 10	April 8, April 21	July 3	–
Foreign Languages	June 5 (written), June 10–11 (oral)	April 1 (written), April 4 (oral), April 18	July 3 (written), July 4 (oral)	–

== Paper forms ==
The Unified State Exam (USE) uses standardized forms to record students' responses. These forms must be completed according to strict guidelines to ensure accurate processing and evaluation. All answer sheets must be filled out using a black gel or felt-tip pen.

The forms include:

- Registration Form: Used to register participants.
- Answer Sheet No. 1: Records responses for Part 1 tasks.
- Answer Sheet No. 2: Used for detailed responses in Part 2 tasks. Additional sheets are provided if needed.

=== Structure and Filling Instructions ===
To ensure clarity and consistency, all forms must adhere to the following instructions:

- Strict Formatting: When completing the forms, students must follow the specified character format as shown at the top of each sheet. Each letter, digit, or symbol (including punctuation marks like commas, periods, hyphens, etc.) should be written in a separate box. Writing multiple symbols in one box is not allowed.

=== Registration Form ===
The Registration Form is used to register participants for the exam. The following information must be filled out:

- Region Code, Educational Institution Code, Class (including number and letter), Exam Center Code, and Room Number.
- Subject Code, Subject Name, and Exam Date (in DD-MM-YY format).
- The participant must sign within the designated rectangular box.

Students must write their Last Name, First Name, and Patronymic in uppercase block letters, placing one letter per square box. The series and number of the identification document (such as a passport or birth certificate) are recorded in designated boxes at the top of the sheet.

=== Answer Sheet No. 1 ===
This sheet is used to record responses for Part 1 tasks. At the top of Answer Sheet No. 1, students are required to fill out the following information:

- Region Code
- Subject Code
- Subject Name
- The participant must sign within the designated rectangular box.

==== Filling in Responses ====
Task numbers are pre-printed on the sheet. To record the response, students must:

- Write each letter, number, or symbol (including punctuation) in a separate square box.
- If there are multiple symbols, each must be written in a separate box.

If a student makes a mistake in the "Results of Tasks with Short Answers" section, the original answer should not be crossed out. Instead, the student should:

- Write the correct answer in the "Correction of Mistaken Answers for Tasks with Short Answers" section.
- Task numbers are not pre-printed in this section. The student should write the task number, followed by a hyphen, and the corrected answer.

Answer Sheet No. 1 is scanned and graded by a computer. Failure to follow the specified format may lead to errors in recognition, which may affect the correctness of the answer.

=== Answer Sheet No. 2 ===
Answer Sheet No. 2, used for extended responses, has a slightly different structure. At the top, students must enter the Region Code, Subject Code, and Subject Name, similar to Answer Sheet No. 1. Additional fields such as "Reserve - 5," "Answer Sheet No. 2 (Sheet 2)," and "Sheet Number" are filled out in the same format, using uppercase characters and individual boxes. Below these fields, there is a large blank grid intended for extended answers or detailed solutions.

- Students must continue using a black gel or felt-tip pen for all entries.
- There is no need to maintain the strict character format used in Answer Sheet No. 1 within this section. Instead, students should write their responses clearly and legibly, following the grid layout.
- Students must indicate the task number before writing the answer.
- Rewriting the task instructions is unnecessary.

After completing the response, any remaining empty space on the page should be filled in neatly to prevent tampering. The letter "Z" is commonly used for this purpose, though any consistent pattern is acceptable.

All forms are highly secured against forgery, featuring elements such as holograms and watermarks. Incorrectly filled forms may result in unrecognized responses, which are counted as errors. The reverse side of the form is not intended for use.

All Unified State Exam (USE) forms are sized at 210 mm × 297 mm.

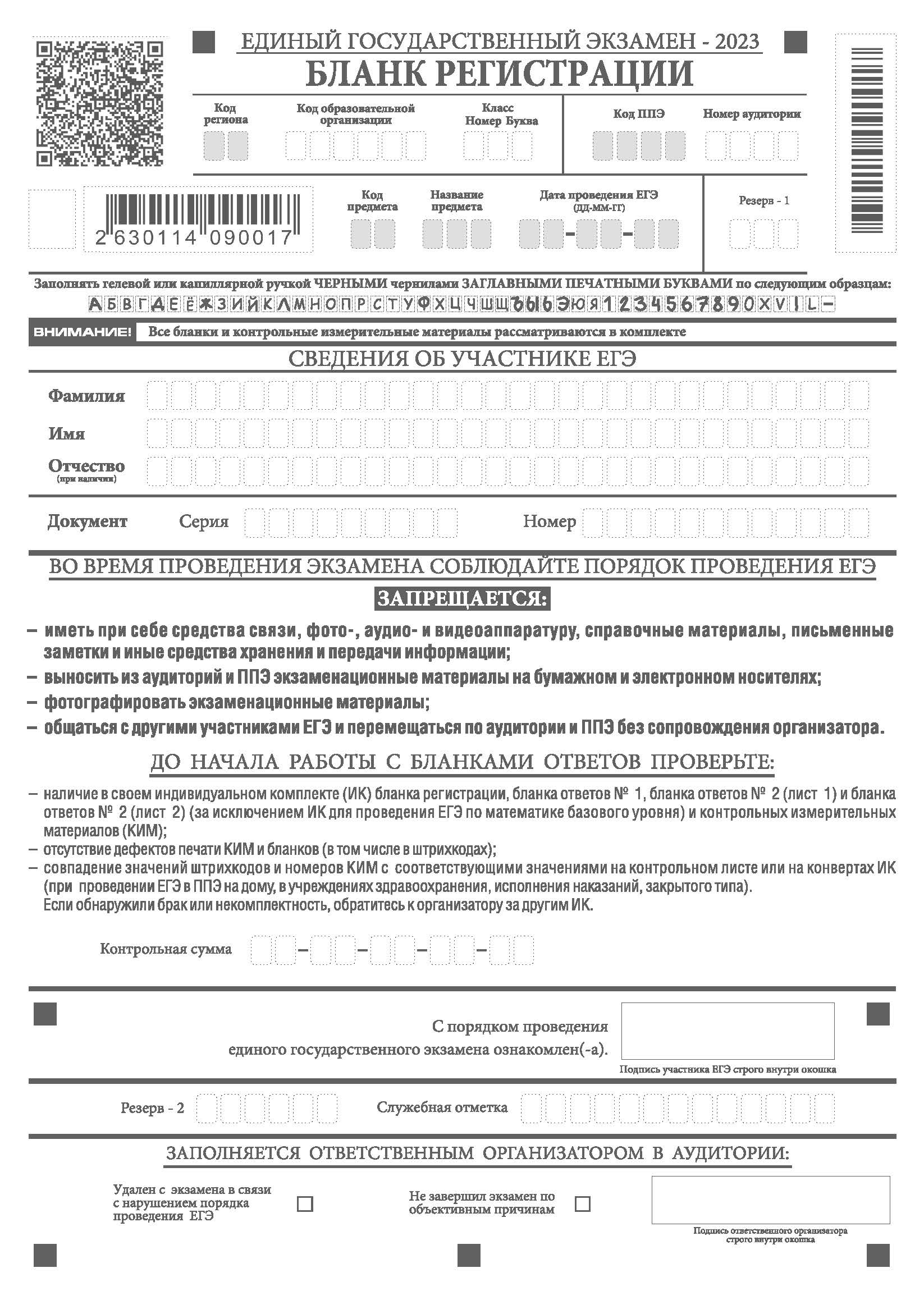
Registration form

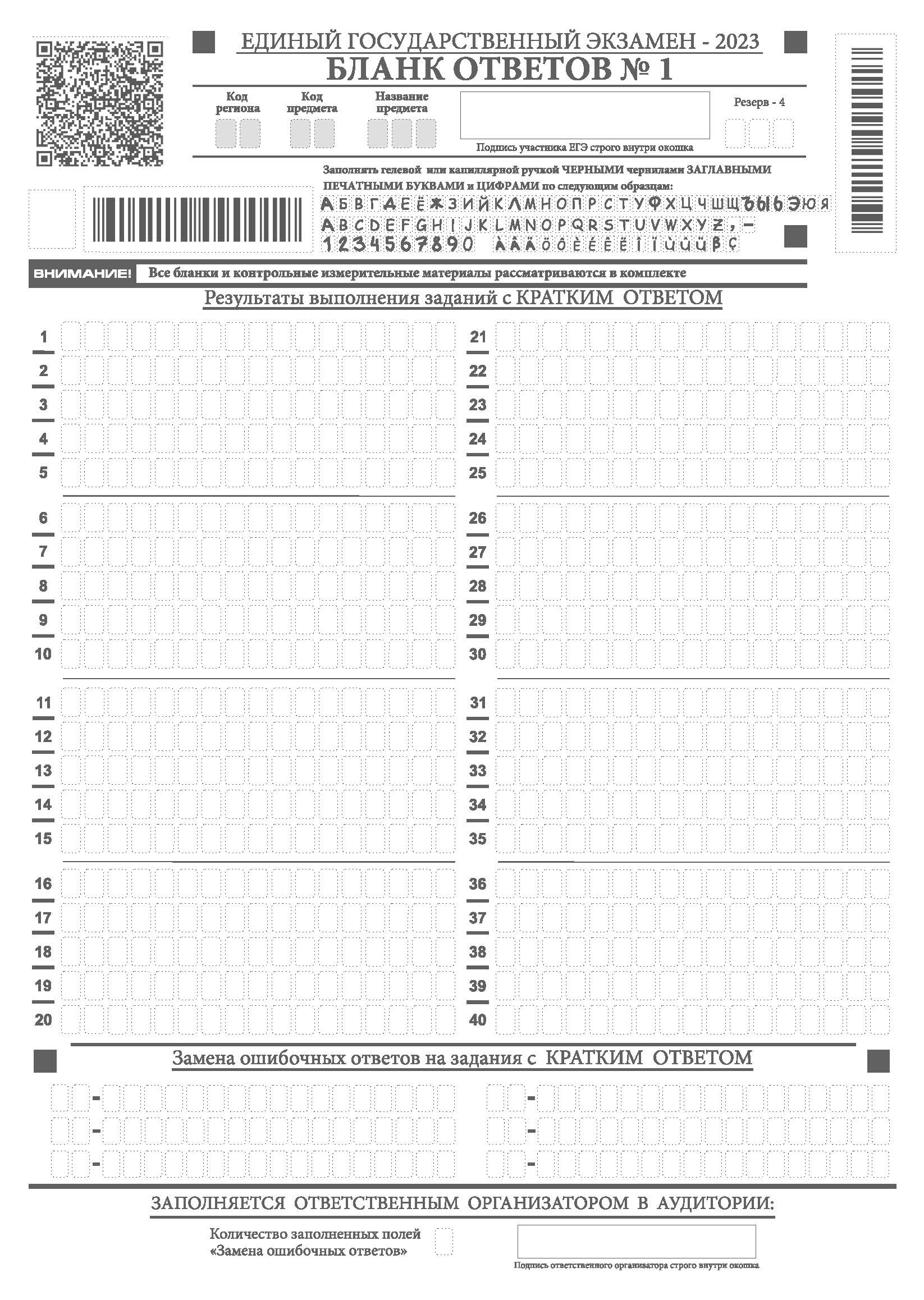
Answer Sheet No. 1

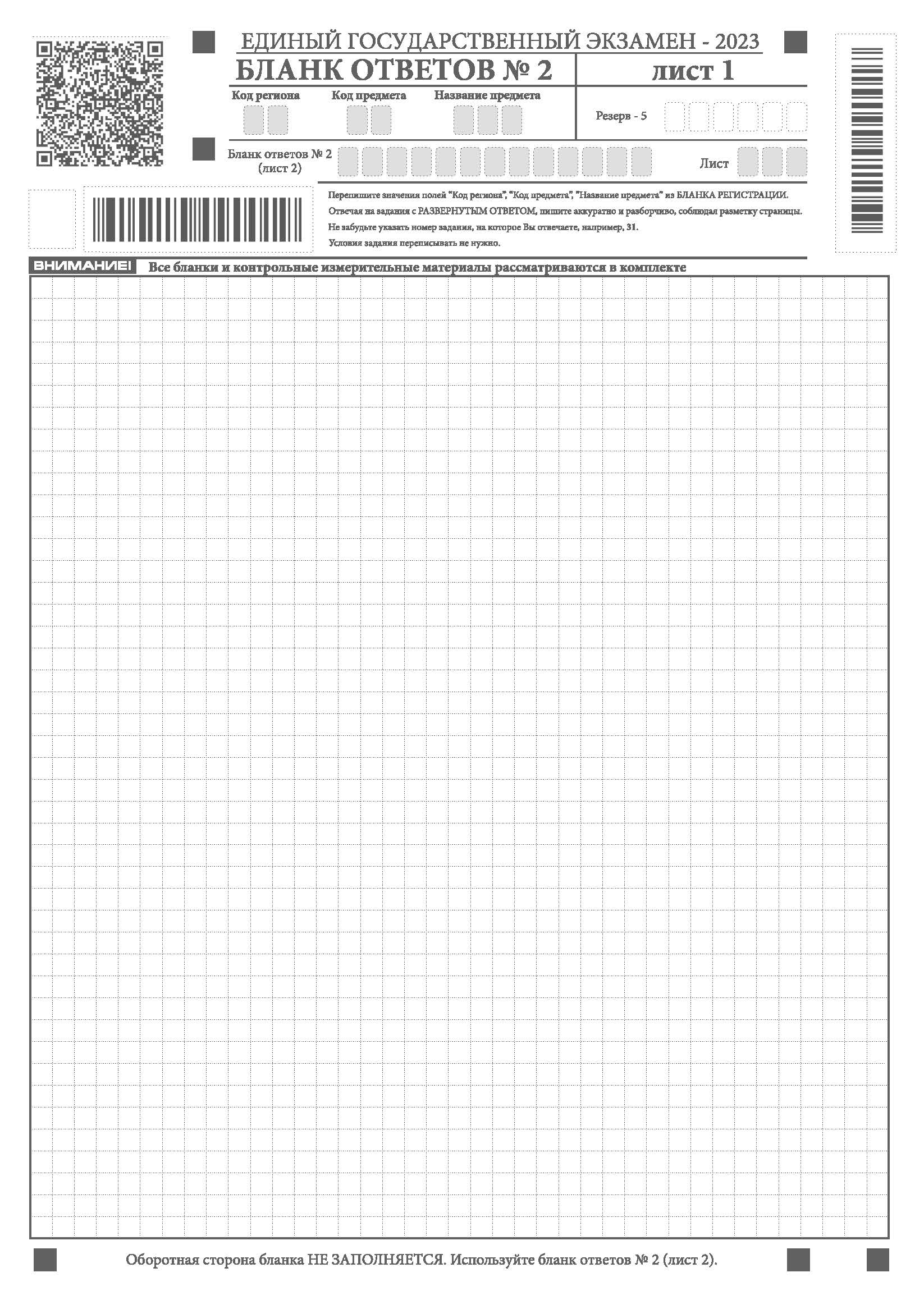
Answer Sheet No. 2 (Page 1)

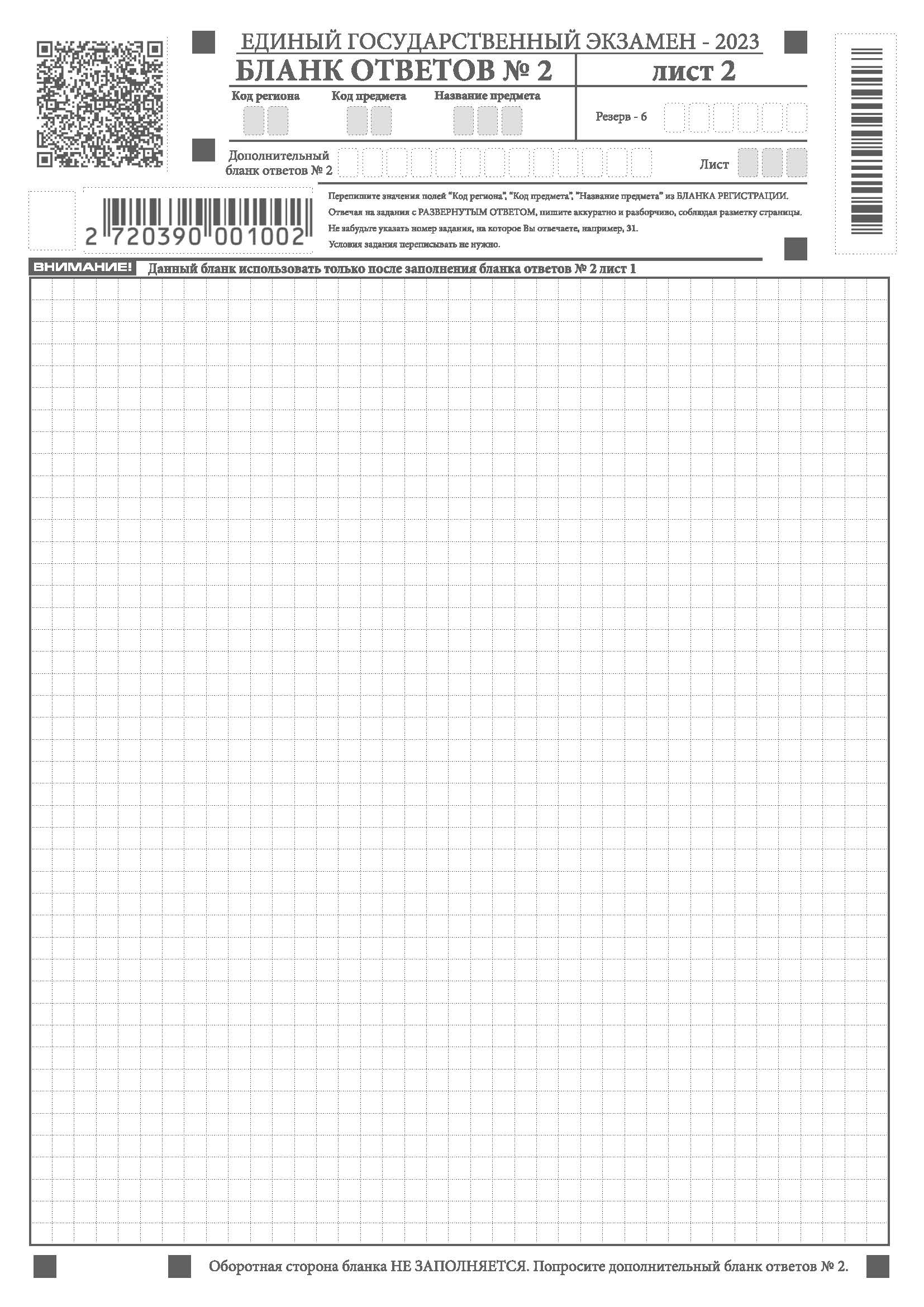
Answer Sheet No. 2 (Page 2)

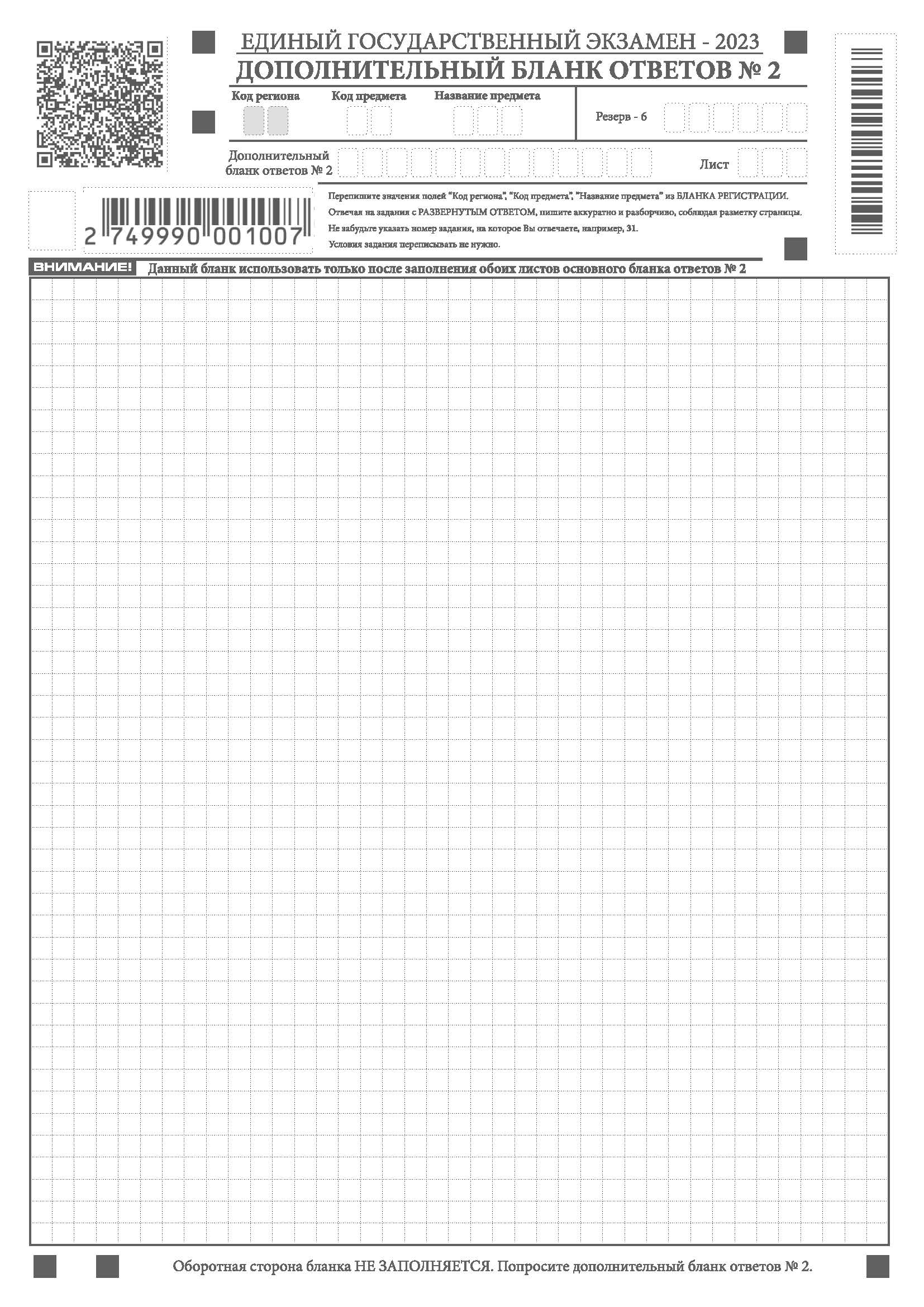
Additional Answer Sheet

== Scoring System ==
Each completed USE task is awarded 1 or more points. The sum of these points forms the candidate's primary score. The number of primary points varies depending on the subject. For example, in 2024, the minimum number of primary points is in the Basic Mathematics USE (21 primary points), while the maximum is in the Foreign languages USE (82 primary points).

Next, the correspondence between primary and test scores is established, with the maximum test score always set at 100. The conversion scale from primary to test scores depends on a statistical analysis of the USE results for all exam participants and is calculated using a specialized computer program. This scale is not uniform across subjects. For instance, in the Russian language USE in 2024, 30 primary points out of 50 were converted into 58 test points, whereas in the Advanced Mathematics USE, 10 primary points out of 32 were also converted into 58 test points.

Another characteristic of the conversion scale is its non-linearity—a small change in primary points at the edges of the scale (i.e., close to zero or the maximum value) leads to a significant change in test points. In contrast, in the middle of the scale, a 1-point change in primary score usually results in an increase of 1 or 2 test points.

== Results and Retakes ==
Since 2009, students can view their USE results online through regional information centers. However, due to privacy concerns, Rosobrnadzor no longer allows publishing personal results on public platforms. Students who fail a mandatory exam can retake it in the same year, but failing both Russian and mathematics requires waiting until the following year.

=== Percentage of graduates who failed the exam on the first attempt ===
Year	Mathematics	Russian Language
2021	7,6%	0.5%
2022	20,5%	–
2023	–	–
2024	6,5%	–

== Appeals Process ==
There are two main types of appeals for the Unified State Exam (USE):

1. Violation of Exam Procedures:
  - If there is a violation of established exam procedures, the participant can file an appeal on the exam day with an authorized representative of the State Examining Commission. If the appeal is upheld, the participant's exam results will be annulled, and they will be allowed to retake the exam on another day as specified in the official schedule.
2. Disagreement with the Scores:
  - If a student disagrees with their score, they can submit an appeal within two working days of the exam results being announced. The appeal will be reviewed by a conflict commission, which may lead to a reassessment of the score (including the possibility of a lower score). If errors are found in the processing or checking of the exam papers, the conflict commission will forward the information to the Regional Information Processing Center (RIPC) for recalculation.
  - The conflict commission does not review appeals related to the content or structure of the exam materials, nor does it address issues related to the student's compliance with exam rules.

== University Admissions ==
The USE is the primary method for university admissions in Russia. USE plays a role of unified entrance exam to the most universities in the country. Applicants submit their USE results along with their applications. Usually, applicants use results from two, three, or four USE subjects. The Russian language exam is mandatory for every application. Results are valid for four years. Some universities may conduct additional exams for creative or specialized fields.

== Controversies and Opinions ==
The debate surrounding the Unified State Exam (USE) has continued since its introduction in 2001. It became especially heated in 2008 when all regions joined the USE system, and most high school graduates began taking the exam.

A portion of graduates and their parents, some university professors, and certain school teachers view the USE negatively. The main reason is that students often receive lower scores on the USE compared to the grades they were given in school or in traditional examination formats. However, since 2009, the final high school diploma grade for each subject is calculated as the average of the student’s grades from the last two years of study, regardless of their USE results. Additionally, USE scores are not converted into the traditional five-point grading scale.

=== Arguments in Favor of the USE ===
1. Helps eliminate corruption and nepotism in university admissions.
2. Assesses students’ knowledge and abilities more objectively than traditional exams.
3. Encourages students to prepare more thoroughly, including independent study.
4. Allows for the comparison of education quality across different schools and regions.
5. Enables students to apply to universities far from their place of residence without traveling, by simply submitting their USE results by mail or online. This also simplifies applications to multiple universities without requiring entrance exams at each one.
6. Identifies talented students from rural areas who previously lacked opportunities to take entrance exams in major cities.
7. Partial computerization of grading saves time and money by reducing the need for human examiners.
8. Raising USE standards is believed to improve overall education quality, teacher qualifications, and the quality of educational materials.
9. The USE is similar to standardized exams in developed countries (e.g., USA, Israel), which could eventually lead to the international recognition of Russian high school diplomas. However, the Russian model more closely resembles the Chinese system, where university admission is based solely on state exam results.
10. The USE provides a wider grading scale (100 points) compared to traditional exams (effectively four levels), allowing for better differentiation among top students.

=== Arguments Against the USE ===
1. The transition from comprehensive exams to standardized tests discourages students from developing reasoning, argumentation, and problem-solving skills, weakening logical and critical thinking abilities.
2. The USE in social studies has been criticized for containing ambiguously worded questions and controversial answer choices.
3. Some test questions can be answered through guessing or elimination without actual knowledge of the subject.
4. The USE does not completely eliminate corruption.
5. A single standardized test cannot adequately assess both weak and highly prepared students.
6. It does not account for school specialization—students from humanities-focused and science-focused schools take the same mandatory exams.
7. The USE format differs from regular classroom assessments, forcing students and teachers to spend additional time learning the exam procedures rather than focusing on the curriculum.
8. The USE has led to a new form of tutoring aimed specifically at preparing students for the exam rather than deepening their knowledge.
9. Errors in the computerized grading of sections A and B can misinterpret student answers, marking them as incorrect.
10. Non-language subjects cannot be taken in the languages of Russia’s ethnic minorities, except Russian.
11. The Russian language USE cannot replace a full-fledged final essay exam, which previously had the highest status among high school exams.
12. Although the USE was intended to increase access to higher education for low-income students, university budget-funded places are still primarily awarded to students from wealthy families.
13. High school students perceive the USE as a stressful experience associated with emotional pressure and increased workload.

=== Legal Proceedings ===
On May 15, 2009, the Supreme Court of Russia upheld the legality of the Unified State Exam (USE) as a form of state final certification for secondary education and dismissed a lawsuit seeking to annul the corresponding order of the Ministry of Education and Science of Russia. The lawsuit was filed by a group of parents of schoolchildren who opposed the use of standardized test formats in the exam.

On April 21, 2009, the Supreme Court of Russia ruled that it is legally justified to prohibit the USE (for non-language subjects) from being conducted in languages other than Russian.

In August 2018, the Central District Court of Novosibirsk rejected a lawsuit filed by Artem Veselov, a graduate of Novosibirsk Gymnasium No. 4, against the Ministry of Education of the Novosibirsk Region. The graduate demanded an increase in his USE score for social studies. Veselov disagreed with the experts' decision, who marked his answer incorrect because he cited a Higher School of Economics textbook that was not included in the official list of recommended school materials.

=== Scandals ===
In the spring of 2010, 70 teachers in the Rostov region were arrested for taking the USE on behalf of students in exchange for a 40,000-ruble bribe. Similar criminal cases were investigated in the Saratov region, the Republic of Dagestan, Perm Krai, and other regions.

In May 2013, students who took the exam in the Far East of Russia uploaded their completed answer sheets online. Due to the time zone difference, students in the European part of Russia were able to access this information before their exams. The scandal drew the attention of Russian Prime Minister Dmitry Medvedev. As a result, some students’ exam scores in the Belgorod region were annulled.

In 2018, Dmitry Gushchin, a well-known educator from Saint Petersburg and creator of the educational website Reshu-EGE, exposed leaked exam tasks for mathematics, and later for chemistry, by publishing them online. These materials had already been widely circulated on the internet. As a result, Rosobrnadzor (the Federal Service for Supervision in Education and Science) filed a lawsuit against Dmitry Gushchin.

== Idea of Partial Abandonment of the USE ==
On April 9, 2014, Minister of Education Dmitry Livanov announced that starting in 2015, there were plans to reintroduce oral exams for humanities subjects. It was also planned to eliminate Section "A" from the USE.

In August 2016, after being appointed Minister of Education, Olga Vasilyeva stated that the USE would not be abolished but that further reforms in the Russian education system were necessary.

In June 2024, deputies of the State Duma from the LDPR, CPRF, and SRZP factions proposed a bill aimed at abolishing the Unified State Exam and returning to a system of traditional state examinations.

== International Comparisons ==
The USE is often compared to standardized exams in other countries, such as:

- United States: SAT and ACT
- United Kingdom: A-levels
- Germany: Abitur
- France: Baccalauréat
- China: Gaokao
- Greece: Panhellenic Examinations
