= UWN =

UWN may refer to:

- University World News
- United Wrestling Network
- University of Wales, Newport
