= Aleksandr Uss =

Governor of Krasnoyarsk Krai

- Александр Усс
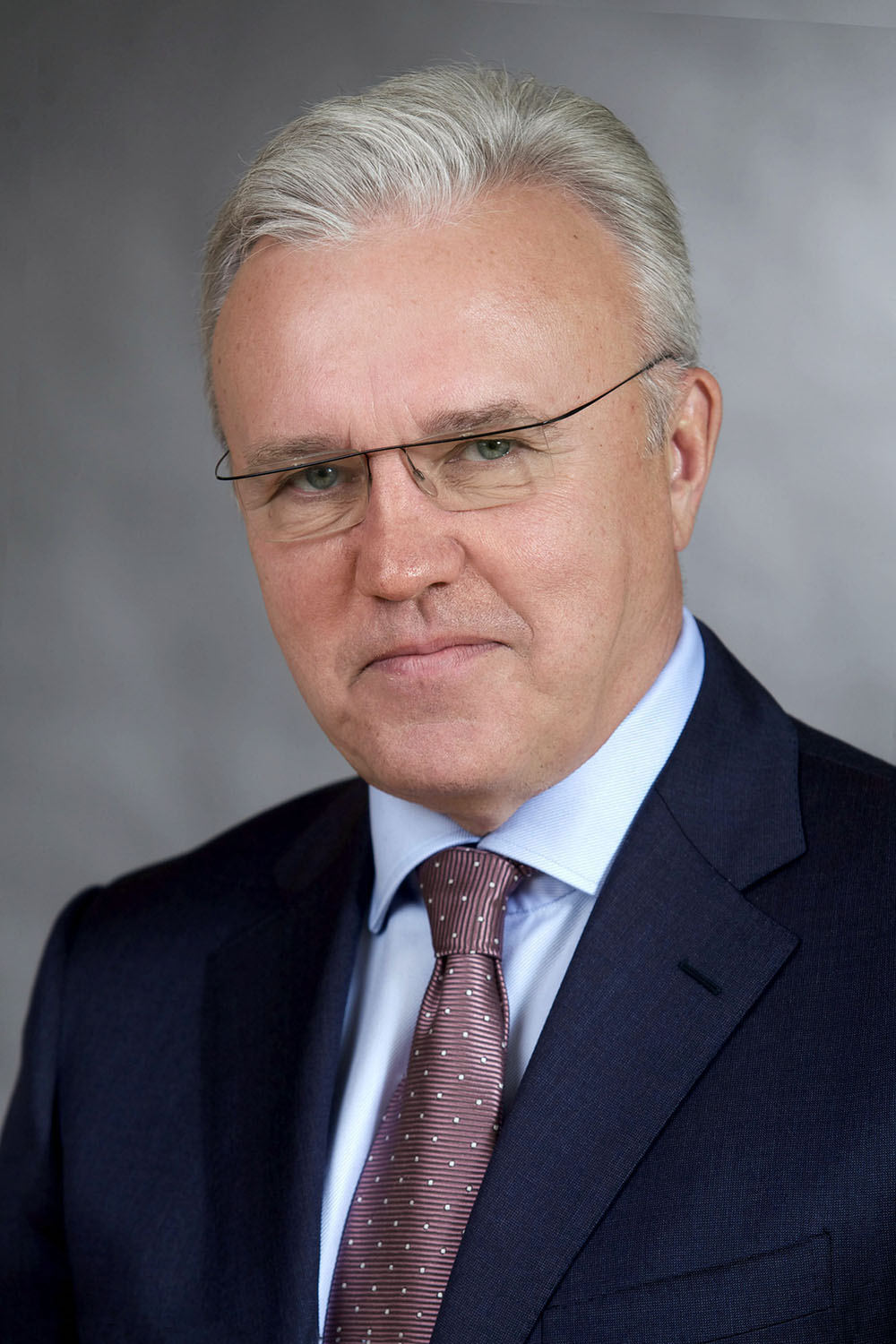
- Uss in 2016

Member of the Federation Councill of the legislative authority of Krasonyarsk Krai
- Incumbent
- Assumed office 8 June 2023
- Preceded by: Valery Semyonov

Member of the Legislative Assembly of the Krasnoyarsk Krai
- In office 25 May 2023 – 8 June 2023

7th Governor of Krasnoyarsk Krai
- In office 21 September 2018 – 20 April 2023
- Preceded by: Viktor Tolokonsky
- Succeeded by: Mikhail Kotyukov

Chairman of the Legislative Assembly of Krasnoyarsk Krai
- In office 9 January 1998 – 29 September 2017
- Preceded by: Stanislav Yermachenko
- Succeeded by: Dmitry Sviridov

Member of the Federation Councill of the legislative authority of Krasonyarsk Krai
- In office 28 January 1998 – 1 January 2002
- Preceded by: Stanislav Yermachenko
- Succeeded by: Vyacheslav Novikov

Deputy Governor of Krasnoyarsk Krai
- In office 30 August 1995 – 7 December 1997
- Governor: Valery Zubov

Deputy of the Federation Council from Evenk Autonomous Okrug
- In office 11 January 1994 – 30 August 1995 Serving with Vladimir Sturov

Personal details
- Born: 3 November 1954 (age 72) Novogorodka, Russian SFSR, Soviet Union
- Party: United Russia

Aleksandr Viktorovich Uss (Russian: Александр Викторович Усс; born on 3 November 1954) is a Russian statesman and legal scholar who served as the governor of Krasnoyarsk Krai from 21 September 2018 to 20 April 2023. He is currently the member of the Federation Council as part of the legislative authority from Krasnosyark Krai, since 8 June 2023.

He is a member of the United Russia party.

From 1997 to 2018, he was the Chairman of the Legislative Assembly of Krasnoyarsk Krai.

Uss was also a doctor of law, professor, and president of the Siberian Federal University.

== Biography ==
Aleksandr Uss was born in Novogorodka on 3 November 1954 to his father, Viktor (1921–2011), and his mother, Maria (1928–2017).

=== Early life and family ===
His father, a German Russian, was a collective farm chairman and received the Hero of Socialist Labour award. He participated in the Great Patriotic War and earned two medals for courage; he was demobilized in 1947 with the rank of junior lieutenant.

His older brother, Vladislav, graduated with an engineering degree from the Krasnoyarsk Agricultural Institute.

=== Education and scientific activity ===
In 1976, Uss graduated with honors from the law faculty of Krasnoyarsk State University.

From 1976 to 1980, he was research assistant and postgraduate student at Tomsk State University. At the same university, he wrote a thesis for the degree of candidate of legal sciences on the topic "Conflicts between convicts accompanied by violent assaults (based on materials from high security penal colonies)".

From 1981 to 1993, he worked in various positions in the Department of Criminal Law at Krasnoyarsk State University. From 1986 to 1988, he was a Fellow of the Institute of Foreign and International Criminal Law with M. Planck based in Freiburg, Germany.

In 1994, at Tomsk State University, he wrote a thesis for the degree of Doctor of Law on the topic "Social and integrative role of criminal law".

=== Political career ===
In 1993, he was appointed head of the legal department of the Krasnoyarsk Krai Administration.

In the same year, Uss was nominated as a candidate to the Federation Council from the Evenk Autonomous Okrug.

From 1994 to 1995, he became a Deputy of the Federation Council of the 1st convocation, and a member of the Committee on International Affairs.

From 1995 to 1997, Uss was Deputy Governor of Krasnoyarsk Krai, under Valery Zubov, and supervised public order and legal issues.

On 7 December 1997, Uss was elected a deputy of the Legislative Assembly of the Krasnoyarsk Krai from the electoral bloc "Union of Business and Order - the Future of the Territory". In January 1998 he was promoted as the Chairman of the Legislative Assembly.

Since 1998, by ex officio, he was a member of the Federation Council, and was a member of the Committee on International Affairs.

In March 2001, Uss joined the Unity party.

On 23 December 2001, he was reelected as a deputy, and on 9 January 2002, he was the chairman of the Legislative Assembly of the Krasnoyarsk Krai.

In December 2001, he resigned as a member of the Federation Council in accordance with the law on the new procedure for forming the upper house of the Russian parliament.

In 2002, he ran for the governor of Krasnoyarsk Krai, took first place in the first round on 8 September gaining 27.6% of the vote, and went to the second round. In the second round of elections he won 42% of the votes, but lost to the Governor of the Taymyr Autonomous Okrug Aleksandr Khloponin, with more than 48%.

On 15 April 2007, he was elected a deputy of the Legislative Assembly of the united Krasnoyarsk Krai, and at the first session of the parliament of the united Krasnoyarsk Krai (May 14, 2007), which Uss was the Chairman of the Legislative Assembly of the Krasnoyarsk Krai, (51 out of 52 deputies present voted for his candidacy, as one ballot paper was considered invalid).

== Governor of Krasnoyarsk Krai ==
On 29 September 2017, by a decree of the President of Russia, Uss was appointed as the acting Governor of the Krasnoyarsk Krai.

On 9 September 2018, Uss was elected governor of the Krasnoyarsk Krai, gaining 60.19% of the vote.

He officially took office on 29 September.

== Personal life ==
Uss is married to Lyudmila Prokopyevna Uss (born in 1954), an entrepreneur who graduated from Krasnoyarsk State University.

They have 2 daughters, Maria Aleksandrovna (born in 1977), a lawyer by training, and Aleksandra (born in 1992), and a son, Artyom (born 1982), a lawyer by training.

On 9 October 2022 the United States Department of Justice charged five Russians and two oil traders from Venezuela with evading sanctions and money laundering. Shortly after, on October 17, Uss's son, Artyom, was detained at Milan Malpensa Airport at the US request. Alexander Uss called his son's detention "politically colored". Artyom escaped from his house arrest in Milan mid April 2023 and clandestinely returned to Russia.

The total amount of the declared income for 2016 was 24 million 492 thousand rubles, spouses 23 million 781 thousand rubles. Hemp owns Tsentralnoye LLC (a company in Krasnoyarsk; lease and management of non-residential real estate).

The income of the Acting Governor for Uss in 2017 amounted to 221.6 million rubles. He owns one residential building with an area of over 324 square meters, four land plots, four country houses, one utility building and a Range Rover.

Lyudmila in 2017 earned 52.5 million rubles. She owns a residential building, three land plots, three apartments, a garage box, two parking spaces, three non-residential premises, a non-residential building and a bathhouse. She also owns three foreign cars: Land Rover, Range Rover, Lexus GS 300, Silver motorboat, Silverado 31A and a trailer.

At the end of 2018, he is the richest leader of the Russian region. The property of the family of the Governor of the Krasnoyarsk Territory is estimated at 1.5 billion rubles.

According to Uss, the inheritance in the form of real estate and finance was received by him after the death of his parents. The father, Viktor, was engaged in agriculture for many years. From his father Uss passed OOO "Central", a house in Sochi, financially.
