= Livanov =

Livanov (Russian: Ливанов, female version Livanova) is a Russian surname. Notable persons with that name include:

- Aristarkh Livanov (born 1947), Russian actor
- Boris Livanov (1904–1972), Russian film actor, and screenwriter
- Dmitry Livanov (born 1967), Russian professor and politician
- Vasily Livanov (born 1935), Russian film actor and screenwriter
