= Student Peace Union =

Student Peace Union (SPU) was a nationwide student organization active on college campuses in the United States from 1959 to 1964. Its national headquarters were located near the campus of the University of Chicago.

The SPU was founded by Ken Calkins, who had gained notoriety when his pelvis was fractured when he sat in front of a truck during a pacifist demonstration against nuclear weapons at the first Atlas Missile site 20 miles northwest of Cheyenne, Wyoming. He had returned to Chicago and became educational director for the local American Friends Service Committee. As part of his duties in that position he conducted a number of peace seminars at local Chicago high schools, where he developed a number of contacts with local students. By the spring of 1959 this network had been organized in the Student Peace Union and by the end of the school year had about 100 members. In 1960 it merged with the Fellowship of Reconciliation-affiliated College Peace Union, which had several campus chapters in the Northeast. By December 1961 the group had 1,500 members at dozens of campuses in the Midwest and Northeast, and a year later would expand to 3,500 members, with inroads on the West Coast and in the South. From the beginning, the Young People's Socialist League, then under the influence of the Shachtmanites, poured its members into the group and tried to give it a "Third camp" direction—rejecting both Western capitalism and Soviet communism as equally imperialist.

The SPU organized a number of protests and vigils at the White House. The first was in November 1961 against the resumption of nuclear testing. To their surprise President Kennedy displayed some sympathy for the group, having his disarmament advisers confer with picket leaders and receiving their petitions. A second protest, the "Washington Action" drew 5,000 students in February 1962. Kennedy sent them an urn of coffee on the first day of the protest, which was held during a snowstorm. The event was co-sponsored by Student SANE, the Students for a Democratic Society (which at the time had a tenth of the membership of SPU) and a Harvard affiliate of the SPU called TOCSIN, which was led by Todd Gitlin. TOCSIN was able to initiate some contacts with senators and State Department officials, combining the protest march with lobbying efforts.

The SPU continued its protests against nuclear testing that spring, when they engaged in the first confrontation between police and anti-war protesters of the decade in New York. During the Cuban Missile Crisis that October, the group sponsored demonstrations across the country, including a march in front of the White House that drew 2,000 people. When the Nuclear Test Ban Treaty was signed in the wake of the crisis it was a mixed blessing for the SPU. While they had always been against nuclear testing, so much of its identity was bound up with anti-nuclear war activism that it struggled to find a new footing. Furthermore it was undermined by the factional struggles within the YPSL between the Shachtmanite "realignment tendency" -- which favored socialist entry into the Democratic party—and the more non-electoral "labor party tendency" led by Mike Parker. The Shachtmanites tried to dilute the labor party tendency's control of SPU by urging a merger with Student SANE, but this fell through. Debates among the YPSLs over when, if ever, to support peace candidates and questions over foreign policy consumed the top leadership, and the organization dissolved in the spring of 1964.

A second incarnation of the Student Peace Union was formed in the fall of 1964 by some of the young SPU members and David McReynolds. While not very prominent nationally, it had chapters on a few campuses not otherwise known for New Left activism - Shippensburg University of Pennsylvania, St. Peter's College, Idaho State University and Rocky Mountain College. It merged with the Campus Americans for Democratic Action to form the Independent Students' Union in 1967

Papers of the Student Peace Union are located in the State Historical Society of Wisconsin.

== Publications ==
- The Pacifist Ethic and Humanism by Philip Altbach [Chicago : Student Peace Union, 1960
- The Youth Peace Corps and the Cold War by Michael Parker [Chicago : Student Peace Union, 1961
- Program Statement of the 1961 National Convention of the Student Peace Union. Chicago: The Union, 1961
- SPU Organizer's Handbook Chicago: The Union, 1961
- Student Peace Union Chicago: The Union, 1962
- Berlin: a Statement Chicago: The Union, 1962
- Minutes of the Student Peace Union National Convention, April 27–29, 1962, Antioch College, Yellow Springs, Ohio. [Ohio? : The Union, 1962
- Feiffer on Vietnam by Jules Feiffer New York : Student Peace Union, 1967
- Bertrand Russell on the War in Vietnam [Bronx, N.Y.] : The Union, 1963
- Songs for Peace; 100 Songs of the Peace Movement. New York, Oak Publications, 1966
