= Hans de Wit =

Dutch educator (born 1950)

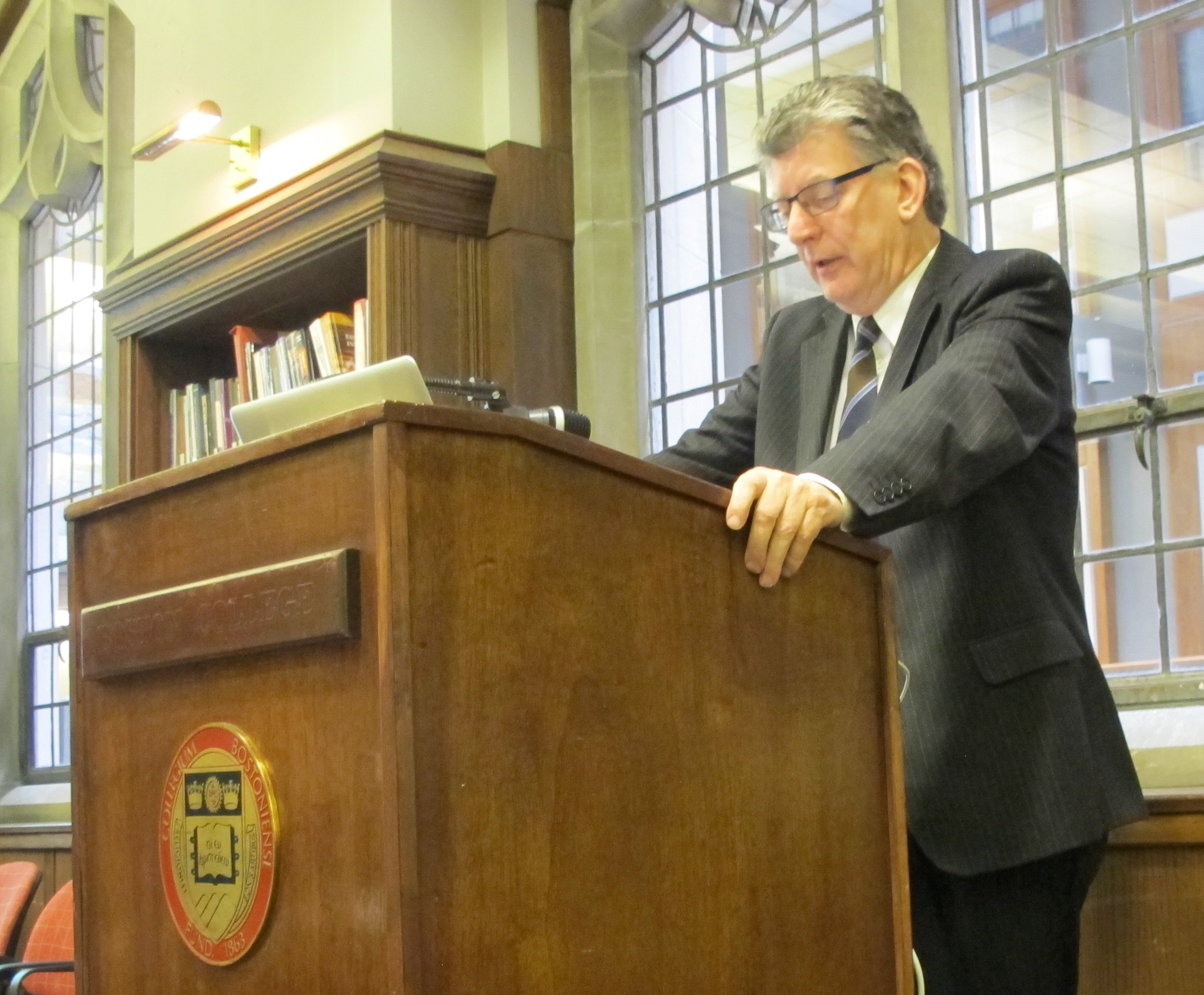
- Hans de Wit
- Born: 10 November 1950; Nijmegen
- Occupations: International higher education specialist, author, researcher, professor.
- Title: Director, Center for International Higher Education, Boston College

Johannes Wilhelmus Maria "Hans" de Wit (born 1950) is a Dutch international educator and higher education administrator, known for his leading scholarly work on the field of Internationalization of Higher Education.

== Current activities ==
Hans de Wit is since 2015 Director of the Center for International Higher Education (CIHE), based at Boston College, USA, where he also serves as professor. Before, he was founding director of the ‘Centre for Higher Education Internationalisation’ (CHEI) at the Università Cattolica del Sacro Cuore in Milan, Italy, and Professor of Internationalization of Higher Education at the Amsterdam University of Applied Sciences.

He has widely consulted with the European Commission, the European Parliament, the World Bank, the International Association of Universities and a variety of universities around the world, on matters related to Internationalization of Higher Education.

In 2014, he was a special advisor to the Study commissioned by the European Commission ‘The ERASMUS Impact Study: Effects of Mobility on the skills and Employability of Students and the Internationalization of Higher Education Institutions’. He was a member of the Scientific Committee and Editorial Board of the second edition of the Bologna Process Researchers' Conference in Bucharest, on 24–26 November 2014. He also was an advisor of the European Commission in the preparation of its communication ‘European Higher Education in the World’ in 2013.

== Editorial work ==
De Wit is the founding editor of the Journal of Studies in International Education, author and editor of several books on Internationalization of Higher Education, and member of specialized editorial boards.

A prolific writer and blogger, Hans de Wit is widely recognized as an influential scholar in the field of Internationalization of Higher Education.

== Early career ==
At the University of Amsterdam, he served as vice-president for international affairs in 1986–2005. Also, he worked as director of international relations at Tilburg University (1981–1985) and assistant professor in Latin American studies at Utrecht University (1979–1981).

== Education ==
He has a bachelor, master and PhD from the University of Amsterdam.

== Public service ==
Hans de Wit is founding member and past president of the European Association for International Education EAIE.

He is a member of the board of trustees of World Education Services, and member of the internationalisation advisory boards in several universities (Stenden University of Applied Sciences in The Netherlands, the University of Göttingen in Germany and the Cooperative University of Colombia in Medellin).

== Recognition ==
He has received several awards for his contribution to the field of international education: EAIE (1999 and 2008), NAFSA (2002), CIEE (2004 and 2006), University of Amsterdam (2006), AIEA (2006 and 2013) and AMPEI (2014).
