= University World News =

Online publication

- Managing editor: Brendan O'Malley
- Categories: Higher education
- Frequency: Weekly
- Format: Online newspaper
- Circulation: 50,000
- Publisher: Higher Education Web Publishing Ltd.
- First issue: 14 October 2007
- Country: United Kingdom
- Language: English
- Website: www.universityworldnews.com
- ISSN: 1756-297X

University World News (UWN) is an online publisher that reports on higher education news and developments from a global perspective.

It is published as a free weekly emailed newsletter and website with articles by correspondents from around the world and commentary articles by academics and professionals working or interested in higher education.

UWN comprises and is owned by a large network of education journalists from all regions of the world. It published its first issue in October 2007. UWN journalists report on higher education from world-ranking universities and from institutions in parts of the globe where universities are not strongly reported.

UWN also publishes a weekly Africa newsletter that has been supported by the Ford Foundation and the Carnegie Corporation of New York. The publication has a close partnership with the Center for International Higher Education at Boston College.

It was an exclusive media partner to the UNESCO World Conference on Higher Education in 2022, and a media partner to the OECD's Institutional Management in Higher Education conference in Paris in September 2010.

In 2016, it has been the media partner for Going Global of the British Council.
