= Valery Semyonov =

Russian politician (born 1960)

- Валерий Семёнов
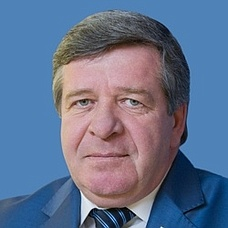

Senator from Krasnoyarsk Krai
- Incumbent
- Assumed office 3 April 2014
- Preceded by: Vyacheslav Novikov

Personal details
- Born: Valery Semyonov; 16 September 1960 (age 66) Cherkessk, Karachay-Cherkess Autonomous Oblast, Stavropol Krai, Russian Soviet Federative Socialist Republic, Soviet Union
- Party: United Russia
- Education: Norilsk Industrial Institute

Valery Vladimirovich Semyonov (Russian: Валерий Владимирович Семёнов; born 16 September 1960) is a Russian politician who served as a senator from Krasnoyarsk Krai from 3 April 2014 to 24 May 2023.

== Biography ==
Valery Semyonov was born on 16 September 1960 in Cherkessk, Karachay-Cherkess Autonomous Oblast. In 1998, he graduated from the Norilsk Industrial Institute. From 1997 to 2000, he was the first deputy head of Norilsk. In February 2001, Semyonov was appointed Deputy General Director of the Norilsk Nickel enterprise. From 2001 to 2007, he was also the deputy of Legislative Assembly of Krasnoyarsk Krai of the 3rd convocation. On 4 December 2011, he became the deputy of the Legislative Assembly of Krasnoyarsk Krai of the 2nd convocation (which was created after merging Krasnoyarsk Krai with Taymyr Autonomous Okrug with Evenk Autonomous Okrug). On 3 April 2014, he became the senator from the Legislative Assembly of Krasnoyarsk Krai.

=== Sanctions ===
Valery Semyonov is under personal sanctions introduced by the European Union, the United Kingdom, the USA, Canada, Switzerland, Australia, Ukraine, New Zealand, for ratifying the decisions of the "Treaty of Friendship, Cooperation and Mutual Assistance between the Russian Federation and the Donetsk People's Republic and between the Russian Federation and the Luhansk People's Republic" and providing political and economic support for Russia's annexation of Ukrainian territories.
