= Philip Altbach =

American writer

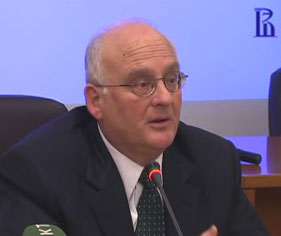
- Philip Altbach
- Education: University of Chicago (AB, AM, PhD)
- Occupations: author, researcher, professor

Philip G. Altbach is an American author, researcher and former professor at Boston College, and the founding director of the Boston College Center for International Higher Education.

== Early life ==
Philip Altbach was born in Chicago in 1941 and was educated at the University of Chicago (AB, 1962; AM, 1963; PhD, 1966). In 1960 as a college freshman, he imported peace symbol buttons into the United States from Britain in 1960. Later, Altbach traveled to England to meet with British peace groups as a delegate from the Student Peace Union (SPU) and on his return he persuaded the SPU to adopt the symbol.

== Career ==
He was a lecturer on education and a postdoctoral fellow in the Department of Social Relations at Harvard University (1965–1967), an assistant to associate professor at the University of Wisconsin—Madison (1967–1975), where he was affiliated with the Department of Educational Policy Studies and the Department of Indian Studies; and he was a professor in the Department of Educational Organization, Administration, and Policy in the Graduate School of Education, State University of New York at Buffalo (SUNY). At SUNY Buffalo, he was an adjunct professor in the School of Information and Library Studies and the Department of Sociology. In 1994, Altbach moved to the Boston College and founded the Center for International Higher Education, and soon became the J. Donald Monan SJ professor of higher education at Boston College, a position which he held until his retirement in 2013.

Altbach has held additional academic appointments, including visiting associate at the Center for Studies in Higher Education at the University of California, Berkeley (1981), visiting professor in the School of Education and visiting senior scholar at the Hoover Institution at Stanford University (1988–1989), senior associate of the Carnegie Foundation for the Advancement of Teaching (1992–1996), Fulbright research professor in the Department of Sociology, University of Bombay, India (1968), and senior Fulbright scholar in Singapore and Malaysia (1983). In 2006–2007, Altbach was the Distinguished Scholar Leader of the Fulbright New Century Scholars program. He holds guest professor appointments from two universities in China, Peking University and Huazhong University of Science and Technology. He created and directed the Bellagio Publishing Network, funded by the Rockefeller Foundation, a forum devoted to improving book publishing in Africa from 1992 to 2000.

Altbach has been the editor for International Higher Education (1994 to present) and associate editor of the American Education Research Journal since 2008. Further, he has been editor of the Comparative Education Review (1978–1988), editor of the Review of Higher Education (1996–2004) and North American editor of Higher Education (1976–1992), and was a founding editor of Educational Policy (1985–2004).

He has authored or edited more than 50 books on topics ranging from higher education to India’s publishing industry to student activism. Some of his books include: Turmoil and Transition: The International Imperative in Higher Education, Comparative Higher Education, and Student Politics in America. He is co-editor the International Handbook of Higher Education, The Road to Academic Excellence: The Making of World-Class Research Universities, Leadership for World-Class Universities: Challenges for Developing Countries, and World Class Worldwide: Transforming Research Universities in Asia and Latin America.

Altbach's contribution to the field of international education has been widely recognized, particularly in relation to topics such as the academic profession, internationalization of higher education, academic mobility, and linking academic research to policy practice. Moreover, he is considered one of the foremost scholars on student politics and activism in the 20th century.
