= Novogorodka =

Novogorodka Новогородка
- Selo
- Location within Krasnoyarsk Krai Location within Russia
- Coordinates: 56.465003°N 96.1501097°E
- Country: Russia
- Region: Krasnoyarsk Krai
- District: Ilansky District

Population (2010)
  - Total: 601
- Time zone: UTC+3:00

Novogorodka (Russian: Новогородка) is a village in Ilansky District of Krasnoyarsk Krai, Russia. Population: 601 (2010 census); 648 (2002 census); .
