= Dmitry Novikov (politician, born 1989) =

Russian politician

Member of the State Duma
- Incumbent
- Assumed office 16 April 2025
- Preceded by: Yury Napso

Personal details
- Born: 5 January 1989 (age 37)
- Party: Liberal Democratic Party of Russia

Dmitry Pavlovich Novikov (Russian: Дмитрий Павлович Новиков; born 5 January 1989) is a Russian politician who has been a member of the State Duma since 2025.

== See also ==
- 8th State Duma
