= Olga Vasilyeva (politician) =

Russian politician and historian

- Ольга Васильева
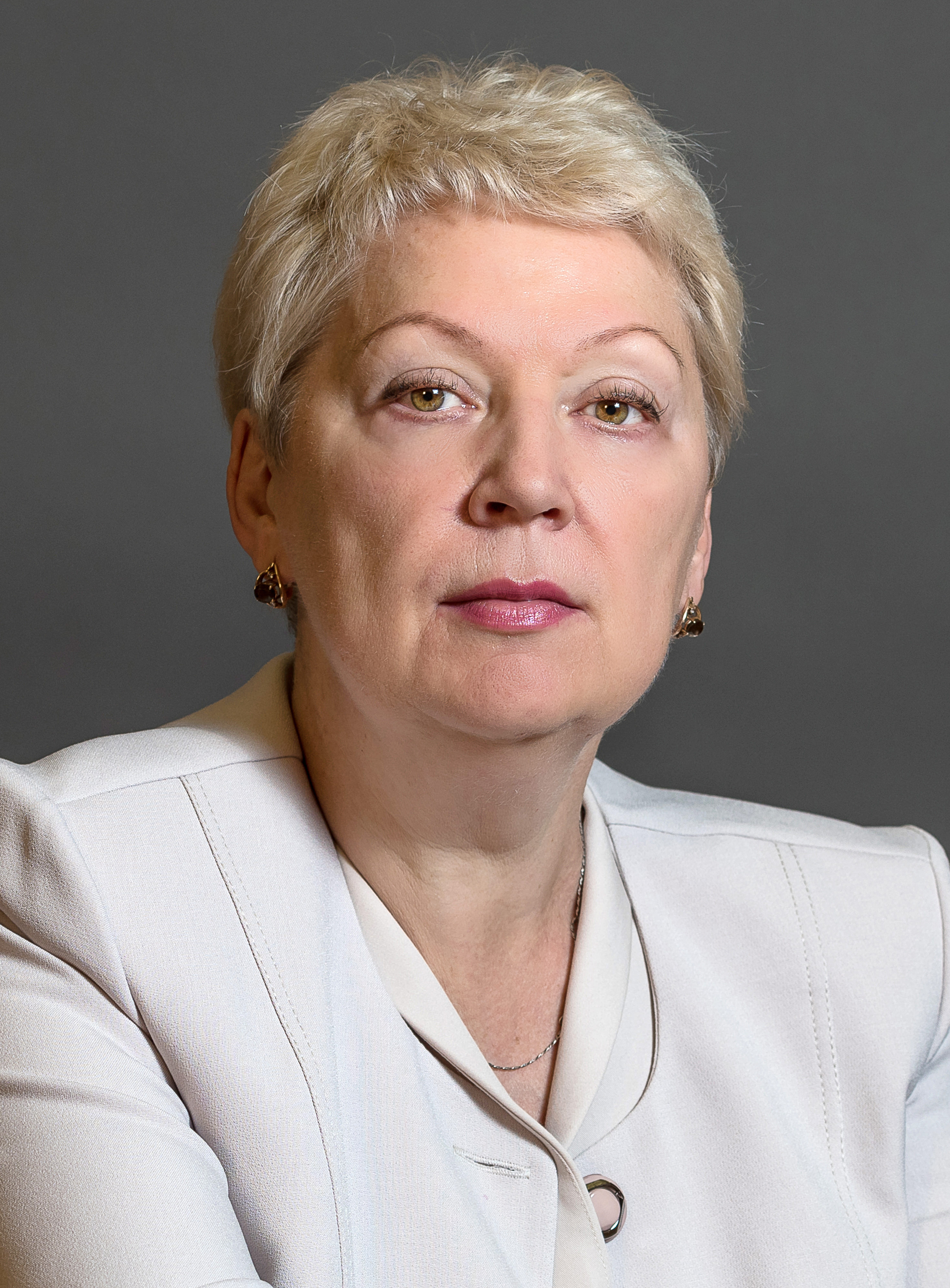
- Official portrait, 2016

Minister of Education
- In office 18 May 2018 – 15 January 2020; Acting: 15–21 January 2020
- Preceded by: office established
- Succeeded by: Sergey Kravtsov

Minister of Education and Science
- In office 19 August 2016 – 7 May 2018
- Preceded by: Dmitry Livanov
- Succeeded by: herself (as Minister of Education); Mikhail Kotyukov (as Minister of Science and Higher Education)

Personal details
- Born: 13 January 1960 (age 66) Bugulma, Soviet Union (now Russia)
- Education: 1. Moscow State Art and Cultural University; 2. Sholokhov Moscow State University for Humanities; 3. Diplomatic Academy of the Ministry of Foreign Affairs of the Russian Federation
- Profession: Doctor of Sciences in Historical science

Olga Yuryevna Vasilyeva (sometimes transliterated as Vasilieva, Russian: О́льга Ю́рьевна Васи́льева; born 13 January 1960) is a Russian politician and historian, who served in Vladimir Putin's government as Minister of Education and Science (2016—2018), and as Minister of Education from May 2018 to January 2020.

== Early years ==
Olga Vasilyeva was born in 1960 in Bugulma.

In 1979 she graduated with a degree in Choir and Conducting from Moscow State Institute of Culture. Later in the mid-1980s she studied history at Moscow State University for Humanities. For several years she was a singing-master and a history teacher.

Afterwards she switched to research work as a historian. In 1987 she was admitted to the Ph.D. program in the Institute of History of the USSR Academy of Sciences. In 1990 she defended her Ph.D. dissertation The Soviet State and Patriotic Activities of the Russian Orthodox Church during the Years of the Great Patriotic War.

From 1991 to 2002 Vasilyeva worked at the Russian Academy of Sciences.

== Civil servant ==
In 2007 Vasilyeva finished a study at the Diplomatic Academy of the Ministry of Foreign Affairs of the Russian Federation. Her career as a person in the state service began in the Department for Culture of the Russian Government. She was responsible, among other items, for primary and secondary school programs, particularly in Russian history and in Russian religious education.

Prior to her ministerial appointment, Vasilyeva was a department head at RANEPA, where she worked since 2002.

== As politician ==
On 19 August 2016 she was appointed a Minister of Education and Science of the Russian Federation in the First Medvedev cabinet. Her Ministry was divided in May 2018 into the Ministry of Education (also called the Ministry of General Education) and the Ministry of Science and Higher Education. On 18 May 2018, Vasilyeva became a Minister of Education of the Russian Federation.

Her appointing was interpreted as a favour to the patriotic part of the governing elite, due to the fact that Vasilyeva was a conservative and a patriarchate-friendly loyalist. She accused her predecessor Dmitry Livanov to be an "apolitical and liberal-minded technocrat who did too little to promote values such as love for the Motherland".

On 15 January 2020, she was part of the cabinet resignation after President Vladimir Putin delivered the Presidential Address to the Federal Assembly, in which he proposed several amendments to the constitution.

== After politics ==
On 30 June 2021 Vasilyeva was elected President of the Russian Academy of Education.

== Publications ==
She has written over 160 articles and 8 books.
