= Dmitry Livanov =

Russian politician

- Дмитрий Ливанов
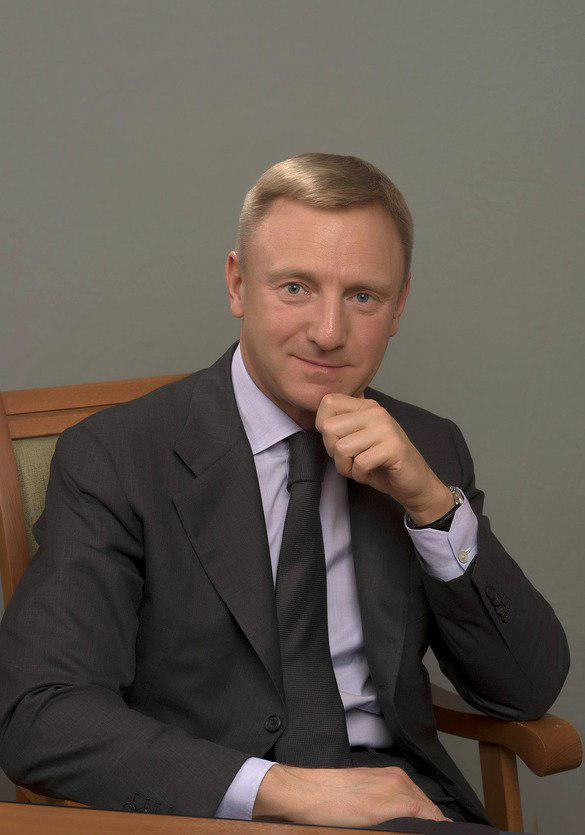
- Livanov in 2017

Rector of Moscow Institute of Physics and Technology
- Incumbent
- Assumed office 15 February 2022
- Preceded by: Nikolay Kudryavtsev

Special representative of the president on trade and economic relations with Ukraine
- In office 19 August 2016 – 5 October 2018
- Preceded by: Mikhail Zurabov
- Succeeded by: Office disestablished

Minister of Education and Science
- In office 21 May 2012 – 19 August 2016
- Preceded by: Andrei Fursenko
- Succeeded by: Olga Vasilieva

Personal details
- Born: 15 February 1967 (age 58) Moscow, Soviet Union (now Russia)
- Profession: Physicist; Doctor of Sciences in Physical and Mathematical Sciences

Dmitry Livanov's voice
recorded June 2013

Dmitry Viktorovich Livanov (Russian: Дми́трий Ви́кторович Лива́нов, born February 15, 1967) is a Russian Doctor of Physics, professor, current rector of the Moscow Institute of Physics and Technology and former rector of Moscow Institute of Steel and Alloys, and the Minister of Education and Science of the Russian Federation from 2012 to 2016.

In 1990, he graduated with honors from the Physical Chemistry Department of the Moscow Institute of Steel and Alloys. In 1990-1992, he studied at the postgraduate in same institute, where he defended his thesis for the degree of Candidate of Physico-Mathematical Sciences on "Heat transfer interacting electrons in superconductors and normal metals". In 1992-2000, he worked in that institute as Research fellow and senior researcher, Laboratory synthesis, associate professor at the Department of Theoretical Physics.

In 2004-2005, he became director of the scientific-technical and innovation department of the Ministry of Education and Science. In 2005-2007, he was promoted to Deputy Minister of Education and Science. In 2007, he became rector of the Moscow Institute of Steel and Alloys and additional President of the Black Sea Universities Network. He held this position till 21 May 2012, when he was appointed Minister of Education and Science of the Russian Federation in Dmitry Medvedev's Cabinet.

In 2013 he signed the reform that incorporated the Russian Academy of Medical Sciences and the Russian Academy of Agriculture Sciences into the Russian Academy of Sciences (RAS), subordinating it to the Federal Agency of Scientific Organizations (FASO), a government-controlled entity which realized a takeover of the RAS assets.

On 19 August 2016 Olga Yurievna Vasilieva replaced Livanov at the head of the Ministry of Education and he was appointed special representative of the president on trade and economic relations with Ukraine., but was removed from that position two years later.

Livanov was appointed rector of the Moscow Institute of Physics and Technology in 2021.
