= Center for International Higher Education =

The Center for International Higher Education, established in 1995, is a global resource for information and analysis about higher education. Located at Boston College in Chestnut Hill, Massachusetts, the Center also sponsors selected research projects.

== Resources ==
The Center’s flagship publication, International Higher Education, is published quarterly and features news and analysis concerning higher education around the world. Its articles cover a wide range of issues of interest to scholars, policy makers and practitioners. The publication seeks to feature countries that do not receive a lot of attention in the research literature, and issues that have salience to current global debates. IHE is translated in Chinese and Russian editions. As part of an ongoing partnership with the Shanghai Jiao Tong University, assumes responsibility for the Chinese translation. The Independent Kazakhstan Quality Assurance Agency in Education is responsible for the Russian translated edition of IHE. In addition, it is published in English by the Deutsche Universitatszeitung for distribution in the German-speaking countries.

The Center’s books include studies of global policy trends, the development of research universities, the academic profession in developing and middle income countries, developments in Asian universities, private higher education in global perspective, and several others.

The Center also hosts a website at www.bc.edu/cihe that is a virtual library containing articles, books, podcasts, and links to online databases, international organizations, and scholars addressing key issues in international higher education. The website includes a complete archive of past issues of International Higher Education.

The special concerns of developing countries are of special interest—themes such as transnational higher education, international students and scholars, global trade in educational services, higher education reform, and others. The International Network on Higher Education in Africa (INHEA) has been a special initiative in recent years. INHEA focuses on African higher education issues and provides information and analysis from many sources. Additional Center foci include the Corruption Monitor, which highlights incidents of academic corruption in its many forms and seeks to provide analysis of trends.

In 2010, the Center, in collaboration with the National Research University Higher School of Economics on Moscow, Russia, engaged in a joint research project on academic salaries, remuneration and contracts across 28 countries.

The Center has received funding from diverse sources including the Ford Foundation, the Carnegie Corporation of New York, the Toyota Foundation, the MacArthur Foundation, the Rockefeller Foundation, and others.

The Center was founded by Philip G. Altbach, J. Donald Monan SJ professor of higher education at Boston College. After Altbach's retirement in 2015, Hans de Wit took over as new Director.

== Publications of the Center for International Higher Education ==
- Philip G. Altbach, Comparative Higher Education: Knowledge, the University and Development, 1997, reprinted 2006. (Commercial edition published by Ablex Publishers. Asian edition published by the Comparative Education Research Centre, University of Hong Kong. Japanese-language translation published by the Tamagawa University Press, Tokyo, Japan. Chinese-language translation published by the People’s Education Press, Beijing, China.)
- Philip G. Altbach, ed., Private Prometheus: Private Higher Education and Development in the 21st Century, 1999. (Commercial edition published by Greenwood Publishers, Westport, Connecticut. Spanish-language translation published by Centro de Estudios Sobre la Universidad, UNAM, Mexico. Japanese-language translation published by the Tamagawa University Press, Tokyo, Japan.)
- Philip G. Altbach and Patti McGill Peterson, eds., Higher Education in the 21st Century: Global Challenge and National Response, 1999. (Published in cooperation with the Institute of International Education, New York. Spanish-language translation published by Editorial Biblios, Buenos Aires, Argentina.)
- Philip G. Altbach and David Engberg, Higher Education: A Worldwide Inventory of Centers and Programs, 2000. (Commercial edition published by Oryx Publishers, Phoenix, Arizona.)
- Philip G. Altbach, ed., The Changing Academic Workplace: Comparative Perspectives, 2000. (Also published as a special theme issue of Higher Education, vol. 41, no. 1-2, January–March, 2001.)
- Philip G. Altbach and V. Selvaratnam, eds., From Dependence to Autonomy: The Development of Asian Universities, 2002. (Commercial edition published by Kluwer Academic Publishers, Dordrecht, the Netherlands. Japanese-language edition published by Tamagawa University Press, Tokyo, Japan. Chinese language edition published in Taiwan. Asian paperback edition published by De La Salle University Press, Manila, Philippines.)
- Philip G. Altbach and Yoshikazu Ogawa, eds., Higher Education in Japan: Reform and Change in the 21st Century, 2002. (Also published as a special theme issue of Higher Education 43, no. 1, January, 2002.)
- Philip G. Altbach, ed., The Decline of the Guru: The Academic Profession in Developing and Middle-Income Countries, 2002. (Commercial edition published by Palgrave Publishers, New York and London. Spanish language translation published by the Universidad Metropolitana Autonoma, Mexico City.)
- Glenda Kruss and Andre Kraak, eds., A Contested Good? Understanding Private Higher Education in South Africa, 2003. (Co-published with PROPHE, University at Albany.)
- Damtew Teferra and Philip G. Altbach, eds., African Higher Education: An International Reference Handbook, 2003. (Commercial edition published by Indiana University Press, Bloomington, Indiana).
- Alma Maldonado-Maldonado, Yingxia Cao, Philip G. Altbach, Daniel C. Levy, and Hong Zhu, Private Higher Education: An International Bibliography, 2004.. (Commercial edition published by Information Age Publishers, Westport, Ct.)
- Francesca B. Purcell, Robin Matross Helms, and Laura Rumbley. Women’s Universities and Colleges: An International Handbook, 2004. (Commercial edition published by Sense Publishers, Rotterdam, the Netherlands).
- Philip G. Altbach and Toru Umakoshi, eds., Asian Universities: Historical Perspectives and Contemporary Challenges, 2004. (Commercial edition published by the Johns Hopkins University Press, Baltimore, Maryland. Japanese language edition published by Tamagawa University Press, Tokyo, Japan. Chinese language edition published by China Ocean University Press, Quingdao, China.)
- Philip G. Altbach and Daniel C. Levy, eds., Private Higher Education: A Global Revolution, 2005. (Commercial edition published by SensePublishers, Rotterdam, the Netherlands).
- James JF Forest and Philip G. Altbach, eds., International Handbook of Higher Education, 2006. (Commercial edition published by Springer Publishers, Dordrecht, the Netherlands).
- D. Bruce Johnstone, Financing Higher Education: Cost Sharing in International Perspective, 2006. (Commercial edition published by SensePublishers, Rotterdam, the Netherlands).
- Philip G. Altbach, International Higher Education: Reflections on Policy and Practice, 2006.
- Philip G. Altbach, Leslie A. Bozeman, Natia Janashia, and Laura E. Rumbley, Higher Education: A Worldwide Inventory of Centers and Programs. Revised Edition, 2006. (Commercial edition published by SensePublishers, Rotterdam, the Netherlands).
- Pamela N. Marcucci and D. Bruce Johnstone, International Higher Education Finance: An Annotated Bibliography, 2007.
- Philip G. Altbach, Tradition and Transition: The International Imperative in Higher Education. (2007). (Commercial edition published by SensePublishers, Rotterdam, the Netherlands).
- Philip G. Altbach and Jorge Balán, eds., World Class Worldwide: Transforming Research Universities in Asia and Latin America. Baltimore: Johns Hopkins University Press, 2007.
