= Ministry of Education and Science (Russia) =

Government minister of Russia

Ministry of Education and Science of Russia
- Министерство образования и науки Российской Федерации

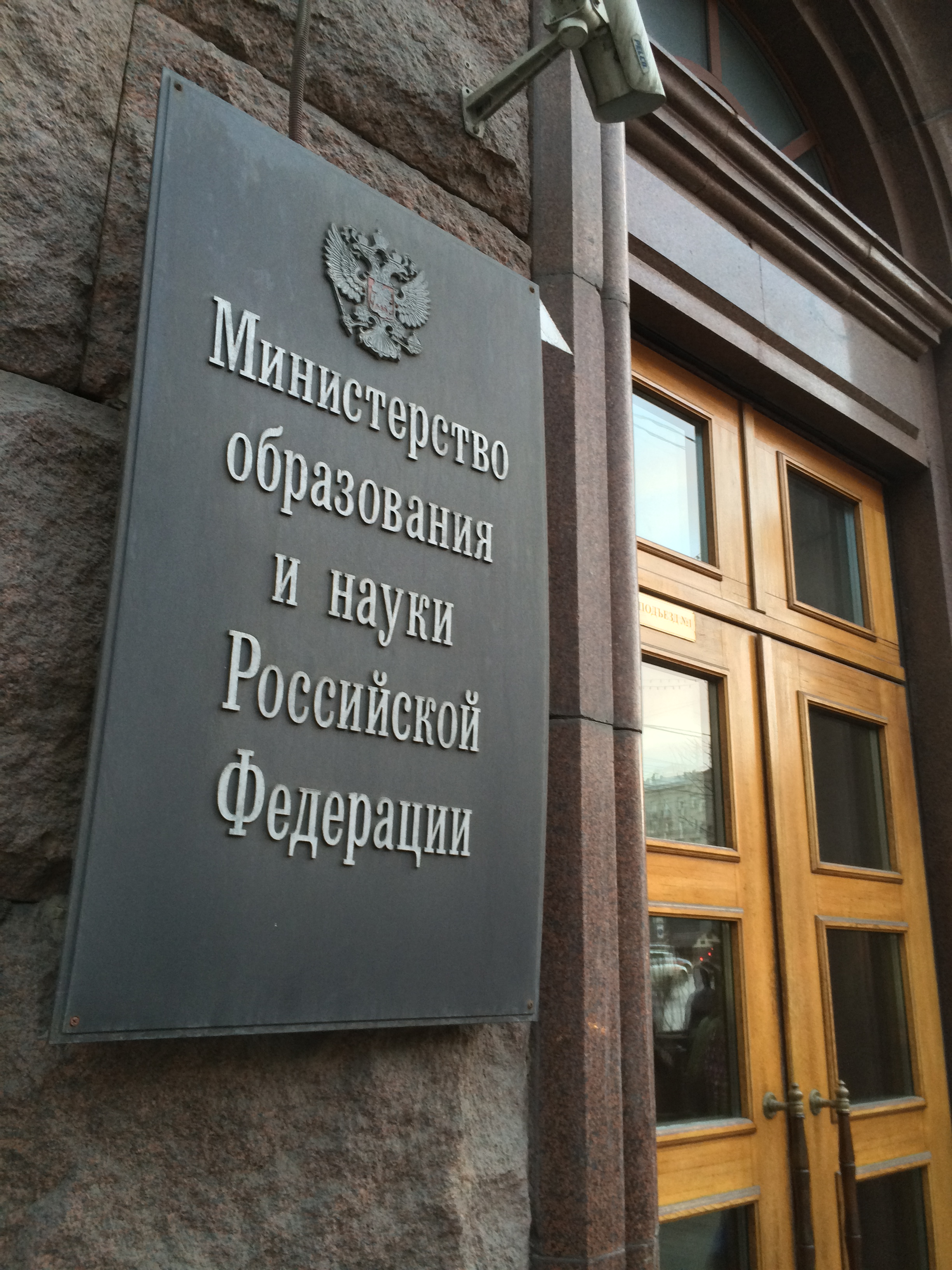
- Ministry's headquarters in 2015

Agency overview
- Jurisdiction: Government of Russia
- Headquarters: Tverskaya 11, Moscow, Russia; 55°45′38.50″N 37°36′35.21″E
- Annual budget: 492.5 billion rouble (FY 2011)
- Child agencies: Ministry of Education; Ministry of Science and Higher Education
- Website: минобрнауки.рф/lang/en

Ministry of Education and Science of the Russian Federation (Russian: Министерство образования и науки Российской Федерации or Minobrnauki of Russia) existed from March 2004 till May 2018. It oversaw scientific institutions, education and school accreditation in the Russian Federation. The agency had its headquarters in Tverskoy District, Central Administrative Okrug, Moscow.

The ministry managed Institutes of Higher Education of Russia, the State educational establishment ("training center of training leaders"), Center of the testing, National Information Center on Academic Recognition and Mobility.

The last Minister was Olga Vasilyeva.

In May 2018 it was decided to split this Ministry into the Ministry of Education and the Ministry of Science and Higher Education.

== Establishing ==
The Ministry of Education and Science of the Russian Federation (in brief, MES of Russia) was established on March 9, 2004 by the Decree of the President of the Russian Federation N 314. The MES of Russia acquired the functions relating to the adoption of regulatory legal acts in the sphere of activity of the previously abolished Ministry of Education of the Russian Federation, and the functions relating to the adoption of regulatory legal acts in the scientific field implemented by the abolished Ministry of Industry, Science and Technologies of the Russian Federation, as well as the functions relating to the adoption of regulatory legal acts in the area of activities of the Russian Patents and Trade Marks Agency.

== Sphere of responsibility ==
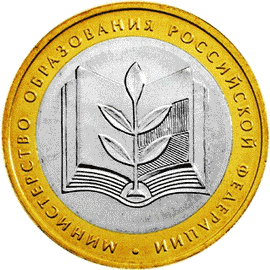

The MES of Russia was a federal body implementing the executive functions relating to the development of state policy and to legal regulation in the following spheres: scientific, scientific and technical and innovative activity, the development of federal centers of science and high technology, state scientific centers and so called "science-cities" and intellectual property, youth policy, education, guardianship and tutorship, social support and social protection of students and pupils of educational institutions.

The Ministry of Education and Science of Russia was a federal executive authority responsible for the state policy development and normative and legal regulation in the sphere of education, research, scientific, technological and innovation activities, nanotechnology, intellectual property, as well as in the sphere of nurturing, social support and social protection of students and pupils of educational institutions. The Ministry assumed responsibility for the demolished Federal Science and Innovations Agency and the Federal Education Agency as per the Decree of the President of the Russian Federation on March 4, 2010 №271.

The work of the Ministry of Education and Science of the Russian Federation was governed by the Constitution of the Russian Federation, Federal Constitutional Laws, Decrees by the President of the Russian Federation, international agreements concluded by the Russian Federation as well as the Statute of the Ministry of Education and Science of Russia.

The Ministry of Education and Science of the Russian Federation worked in cooperation with other federal executive bodies, executive bodies of the subjects of the Russian Federation, local authorities, public associations and other institutions.

== FIPSE ==
In 2008 the Russian Ministry of Education and the United States Department of Education embarked on their first joint education initiative, the FIPSE scholarship. US universities involved in the joint grant include Indiana University, University of Illinois, the University of Iowa, and the University of Nebraska at Omaha.

== Splitting ==
On May 15, 2018 the Ministry of Education and Science was split into the Ministry of Education (Russian: Министерство просвещения, literarily "Ministry of Enlightenment") and the Ministry of Science and Higher Education (Russian: Министерство науки и высшего образования). The former will oversee the country's grade schools and vocational schools, while the latter should manage universities and research institutions. The Federal Agency for Scientific Organizations (FASO), which managed the institutions of the Russian Academy of Sciences in 2013—2018, would now become part of the Ministry of Science and Higher Education. The corresponding executive order was signed by the President Vladimir Putin.

After splitting, the Russian abbreviation Minobrnauki of Russia previously implied the parent ministry, is henceforth officially used with respect to the child Ministry of Science and Higher Education.
