= List of rural localities in Krasnoyarsk Krai =

Map of Russia with Krasnoyarsk Krai highlighted

This is a list of rural localities in Krasnoyarsk Krai. Krasnoyarsk Krai (Russian: Красноя́рский край, romanized: Krasnoyarsky kray, IPA: [krəsnɐˈjarskʲɪj ˈkraj]) is a federal subject of Russia (a krai), with its administrative center in the city of Krasnoyarsk—the third-largest city in Siberia (after Novosibirsk and Omsk). Comprising half of the Siberian Federal District, Krasnoyarsk Krai is the largest krai in the Russian Federation, the second largest federal subject (after the neighboring Sakha Republic) and the third largest subnational governing body by area in the world, after Sakha and the Australian state of Western Australia. The krai covers an area of 2,339,700 square kilometers (903,400 sq mi), which is nearly one quarter the size of the entire country of Canada (the next-largest country in the world after Russia), constituting roughly 13% of the Russian Federation's total area and containing a population of 2,828,187, or just under 2% of its population, per the 2010 Census.

== Abansky District ==
Rural localities in Abansky District:

- Aban

== Birilyussky District ==
Rural localities in Birilyussky District:

- Novobirilyussy

== Boguchansky District ==
Rural localities in Boguchansky District:

- Boguchany

== Bolsheuluysky District ==
Rural localities in Bolsheuluysky District:

- Bolshoy Uluy

== Dzerzhinsky District ==
Rural localities in Dzerzhinsky District:

- Dzerzhinskoye

== Evenkiysky District ==
Rural localities in Evenkiysky District:

- Baykit
- Poligus
- Tura
- Vanavara
- Yessey

== Idrinsky District ==
Rural localities in Idrinsky District:

- Idrinskoye
- Zezezino

== Ilansky District ==
Rural localities in Ilansky District:

- Abakumovka

== Irbeysky District ==
Rural localities in Irbeysky District:

- Irbeyskoye

== Karatuzsky District ==
Rural localities in Karatuzsky District:

- Karatuzskoye
- Nizhnyaya Bulanka

== Kazachinsky District ==
Rural localities in Kazachinsky District:

- Kazachinskoye

== Krasnoturansky District ==
Rural localities in Krasnoturansky District:

- Krasnoturansk

== Kuraginsky District ==
Rural localities in Kuraginsky District:

- Petropavlovka

== Mansky District ==
Rural localities in Mansky District:

- Shalinskoye

== Novosyolovsky District ==
Rural localities in Novosyolovsky District:

- Novosyolovo

== Partizansky District ==
Rural localities in Partizansky District:

- Partizanskoye

== Pirovsky District ==
Rural localities in Pirovsky District:

- Pirovskoye

== Rybinsky District ==
Rural localities in Rybinsky District:

- Loshchinka

== Sayansky District ==
Rural localities in Sayansky District:

- Abalakovo
- Aginskoye

== Severo-Yeniseysky District ==
Rural localities in Severo-Yeniseysky District:

- Teya

== Shushensky District ==
Rural localities in Shushensky District:

- Kazantsevo

== Sukhobuzimsky District ==
Rural localities in Sukhobuzimsky District:

- Sukhobuzimskoye

== Taseyevsky District ==
Rural localities in Taseyevsky District:

- Taseyevo

== Taymyrsky Dolgano-Nenetsky District ==
Rural localities in Taymyrsky Dolgano-Nenetsky District:

- Khatanga
- Popigay
- Volochanka

== Turukhansky District ==
Rural localities in Turukhansky District:

- Bor
- Kellog
- Kureika
- Mirnoye
- Podkamennaya Tunguska
- Turukhansk
- Yanov Stan

== Tyukhtetsky District ==
Rural localities in Tyukhtetsky District:

- Tyukhtet

== Yeniseysky District ==
Rural localities in Yeniseysky District:

- Abalakovo

== Yermakovsky District ==
Rural localities in Yermakovsky District:

- Yermakovskoye

== Zheleznogorsk ==
Rural localities in Zheleznogorsk:

- Dodonovo

== See also ==
- Lists of rural localities in Russia
