= Abalakovo =

Abalakovo (Russian: Абалаково) is the name of several inhabited localities in Russia.

== Krasnoyarsk Krai ==
As of 2010, two rural localities in Krasnoyarsk Krai bear this name:

- Abalakovo, Sayansky District, Krasnoyarsk Krai
- Abalakovo, Yeniseysky District, Krasnoyarsk Krai

== Irkutsk Oblast ==
As of 2010, one rural locality in Irkutsk Oblast bears this name:

- Abalakovo, Irkutsk Oblast
