= Rybinsky =

Rybinsky (masculine), Rybinskaya (feminine), or Rybinskoye (neuter) may refer to:

- Rybinsky District, name of several districts in Russia
- Rybinsky (rural locality) (Rybinskaya, Rybinskoye), name of several rural localities in Russia
