= Idrinsky =

Idrinsky (masculine), Idrinskaya (feminine), or Idrinskoye (neuter) may refer to:

- Idrinsky District, a district in Krasnoyarsk Krai, Russia
- Idrinskoye, a rural locality (a selo) in Krasnoyarsk Krai, Russia
