= Irbeysky =

Irbeysky (masculine), Irbeyskaya (feminine), or Irbeyskoye (neuter) may refer to:

- Irbeysky District, a district in Krasnoyarsk Krai, Russia
- Irbeyskoye, a rural locality (a selo) in Krasnoyarsk Krai, Russia
