= Bolshaya Tes =

Bolshaya Tes Большая Тесь (Russian)
- Abandoned village
- Location within Krasnoyarsk Krai
- Coordinates: 54°48′N 90°59′E
- Country: Russia
- Federal subject: Krasnoyarsk Krai
- District: Novosyolovsky District

Bolshaya Tes (Russian: Большая Тесь) was a rural locality (village) in the Novosyolovsky District of Krasnoyarsk Krai, Russia.

== Geography ==
Bolshaya Tes was named after the Bolshaya Tes River, currently known as Tes, which flowed into the Yenisey near the village. On the maps from the 19th and early 20th centuries, it was called Tesinskaya.

== History ==
Bolshaya Tes was a village in the Novoselovskaya volost of the Minusinsky Uyezd in Yeniseysk Governorate. It was flooded during the filling of the Krasnoyarsk Reservoir in 1972.

== Notable people ==
Bolshaya Tes is the birthplace of politician Konstantin Chernenko.
