= Balakhta =

Balakhta Балахта
- Urban-type settlement
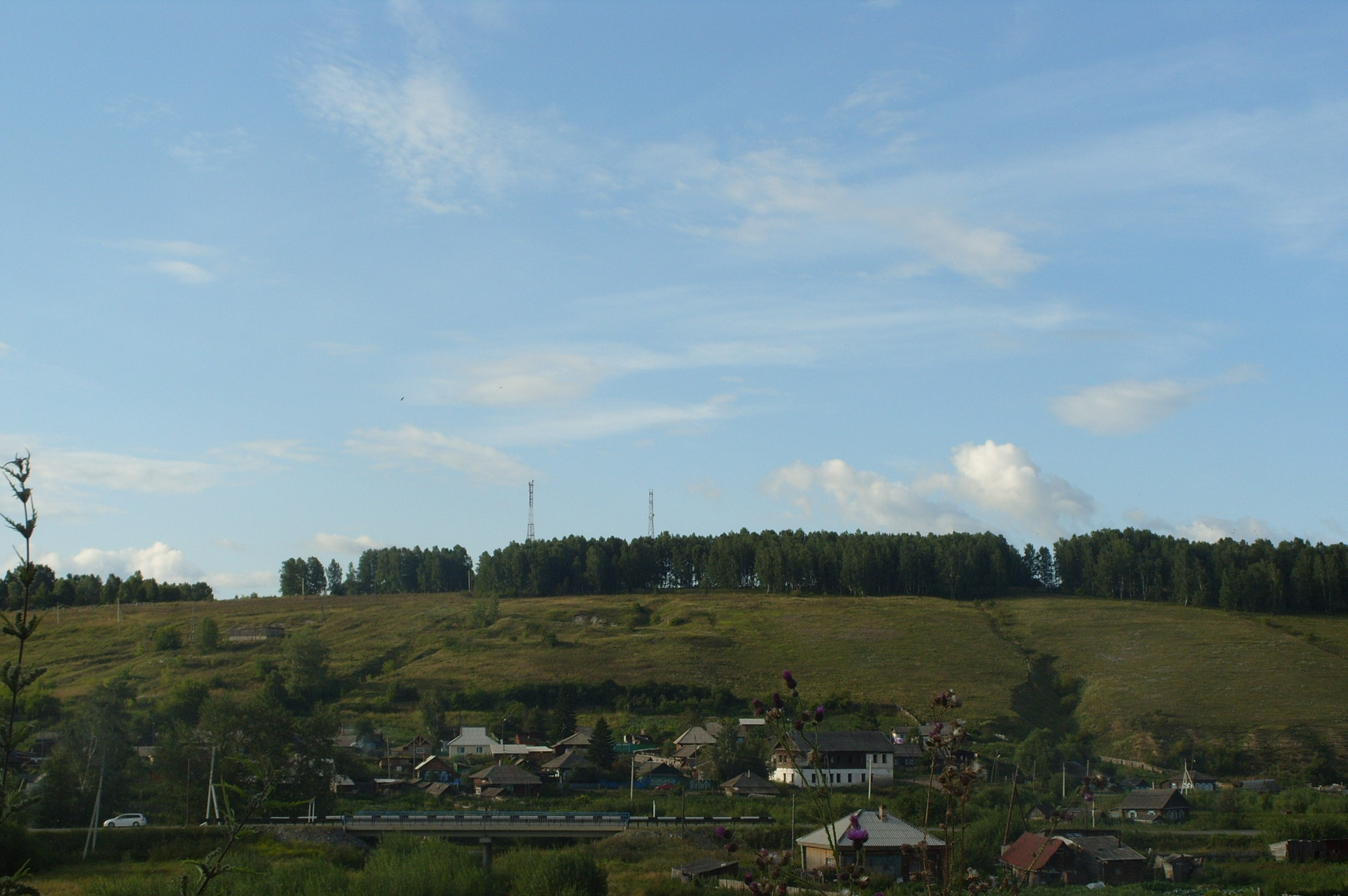
- Interactive map of Balakhta
- Location of Balakhta Balakhta (Krasnoyarsk Krai)
- Coordinates: 55.3857°N 91.6343°E
- Country: Russia
- Federal subject: Krasnoyarsk Krai
- Administrative district: Balakhtinsky District
- Founded: 1924
- Elevation: 321 m (1,053 ft)

Population (2010 Census)
  - Total: 7,410
  - Estimate (2025): 6,888 (−7%)
- Time zone: UTC+7 (MSK+4)
- Postal code: 662340
- OKTMO ID: 04604151051

Balakhta (Russian: Балахта́) is an urban locality (an urban-type settlement) in Balakhtinsky District of Krasnoyarsk Krai, Russia. Population: 7,410 (2010 census); 7,843 (2002 census); 7,793 (1989 Soviet census).
