= Kozulka =

Kozulka Козулька
- Urban-type settlement
- Interactive map of Kozulka
- Location of Kozulka Kozulka (Krasnoyarsk Krai)
- Coordinates: 56.1649°N 91.3926°E
- Country: Russia
- Federal subject: Krasnoyarsk Krai
- Administrative district: Kozulsky District
- Founded: 1892

Population (2010 Census)
  - Total: 7,998
  - Estimate (2025): 6,128 (−23.4%)
- Time zone: UTC+7 (MSK+4)
- Postal codes: 662050 and 662051
- OKTMO ID: 04626151051

Kozulka (Russian: Козу́лька) is an urban locality (an urban-type settlement) in Kozulsky District of Krasnoyarsk Krai, Russia. Population: 7,998 (2010 census); 8,800 (2002 census); 8,910 (1989 Soviet census).
