= Konstantin Chernenko =

Leader of the Soviet Union from 1984 to 1985

- Константин Черненко
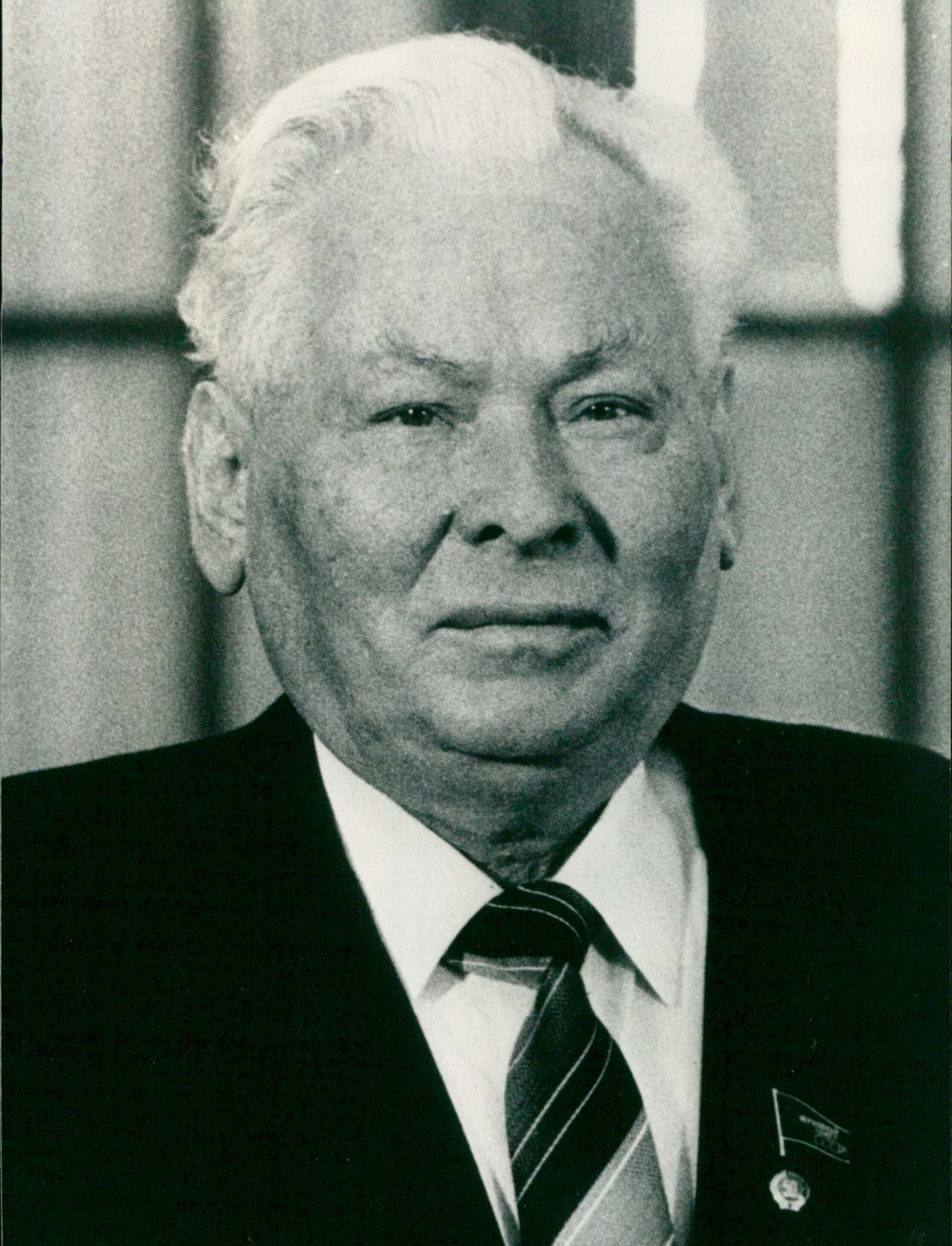
- Chernenko in 1984

General Secretary of the Communist Party of the Soviet Union
- In office 13 February 1984 – 10 March 1985
- Preceded by: Yuri Andropov
- Succeeded by: Mikhail Gorbachev

Chairman of the Presidium of the Supreme Soviet of the Soviet Union
- In office 11 April 1984 – 10 March 1985
- Premier: Nikolai Tikhonov
- Deputy: Vasily Kuznetsov
- Preceded by: Vasily Kuznetsov (acting)
- Succeeded by: Vasily Kuznetsov (acting)

Second Secretary of the Communist Party of the Soviet Union
- In office 10 November 1982 – 9 February 1984
- Preceded by: Yuri Andropov
- Succeeded by: Mikhail Gorbachev (de facto)
- In office 25 January 1982 – 24 May 1982 (Acting)
- Preceded by: Mikhail Suslov
- Succeeded by: Yuri Andropov

Personal details
- Born: 24 September [O.S. 11 September] 1911 Bolshaya Tes, Russia
- Died: 10 March 1985 (aged 73) Moscow, Soviet Union
- Resting place: Kremlin Wall Necropolis
- Party: CPSU (1931–1985)
- Spouse(s): Faina Vassilyevna Chernenko Anna Dmitrievna Lyubimova (m. 1944)
- Children: 4, including Albert
- Awards: See List

Military service
- Allegiance: Soviet Union
- Branch/service: Soviet Armed Forces
- Years of service: 1930–1933
- Central institution membership: 1971–1985: Full member of the 24th, 25th, 26th Central Committee; 1978–1985: Full member of the 25th, 26th Politburo; 1977–1978: Candidate member of the 25th Politburo; 1976–1985: Member of the 25th, 26th Secretariat; Other political offices held: 1976–1982: Senior Secretary of Cadres of the CPSU; 1984–1985: Chairman, Defense Council; 1965–1982: Head of the General Department of the Central Committee; Leader of the Soviet Union: ← Andropov; Gorbachev →

Konstantin Ustinovich Chernenko (Note: /tʃɜːrˈnɛŋkoʊ/; Russian: Константин Устинович Черненко, IPA: [kənstɐnˈtʲin ʊˈsʲtʲinəvʲɪtɕ tɕɪrˈnʲenkə] Ukrainian: Костянтин Устинович Черненко, romanized: Kostiantyn Ustynovych Chernenko) (24 September [O.S. 11 September] 1911 – 10 March 1985) was a Soviet politician who served as the de jure leader of the Soviet Union from February 1984 until his death in March 1985.

Born to a poor family in Siberia, Konstantin Chernenko joined the Komsomol in 1929 and became a full member of the ruling Communist Party of the Soviet Union in 1931. After holding a series of propaganda posts, in 1948 he became the head of the propaganda department in Moldavia, serving under Leonid Brezhnev. After Brezhnev took over as First Secretary of the CPSU in 1964, Chernenko was appointed to head the General Department of the Central Committee. In this capacity, he became responsible for setting the agenda for the Politburo and drafting Central Committee decrees. By 1971 Chernenko became a full member of the Central Committee and later a full member of the Politburo in 1978.

Following the death of Yuri Andropov, Chernenko was elected General Secretary of the party's Central Committee on 13 February 1984 and Chairman of the Presidium of the Supreme Soviet on 11 April 1984. Despite assuming offices associated with the Soviet Union's highest authority, Chernenko's power was significantly undermined by his failing health and lack of support among the nomenklatura who viewed him as a transitional figurehead. Thus, he was compelled to rule the country as part of an unofficial triumvirate alongside Defense Minister Dmitry Ustinov and Foreign Minister Andrei Gromyko for most of his tenure. After leading the party for less than 13 months, Chernenko died on 10 March 1985 and was succeeded as General Secretary by Mikhail Gorbachev.

== Early life and political career ==
=== Origins ===
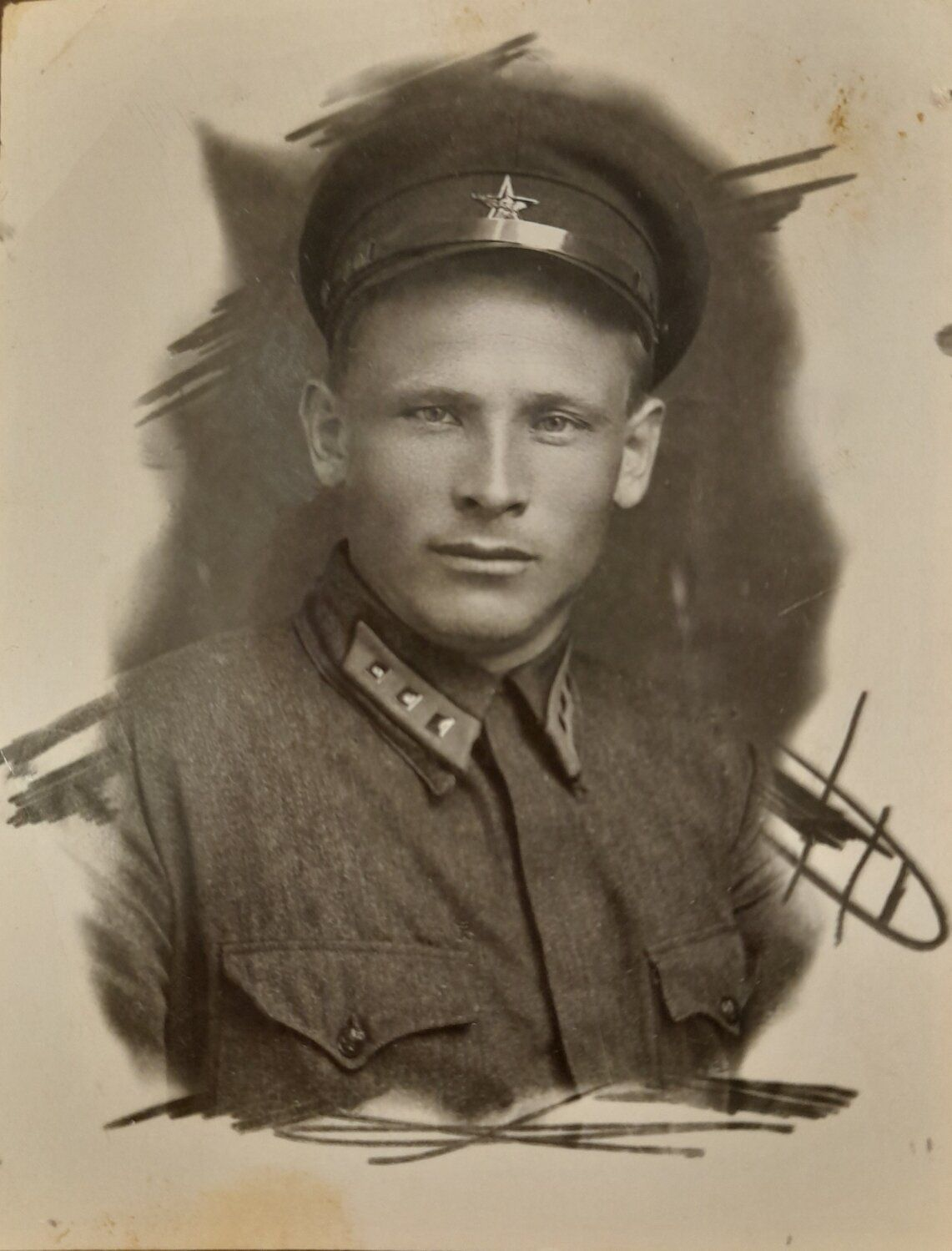
Chernenko as a Soviet frontier guard in 1930

Chernenko was born to a poor family in the Siberian village of Bolshaya Tes (now in Novosyolovsky District, Krasnoyarsk Krai) on 24 September 1911.

Chernenko joined the Komsomol (Communist Youth League) in 1929. By 1931 he became a full member of the ruling Communist Party. From 1930 to 1933, he served in the Soviet frontier guards on the Soviet–Chinese border. After completing his military service, he returned to Krasnoyarsk as a propagandist. In 1933 he worked in the Propaganda Department of the Novosyolovsky District Party Committee. A few years later he was promoted to head of the same department in Uyarsk Raykom.

Chernenko steadily rose through the Party ranks, becoming the Director of the Krasnoyarsk House of Party Enlightenment before being named Deputy Head of the Agitprop Department of Krasnoyarsk's Territorial Committee in 1939. In the early 1940s, he began a close relationship with Fyodor Kulakov and was named Secretary of the Territorial Party Committee for Propaganda. By 1945 he acquired a diploma from a party training school in Moscow then later finished a correspondence course for schoolteachers in 1953.

=== Rise to the Soviet leadership ===
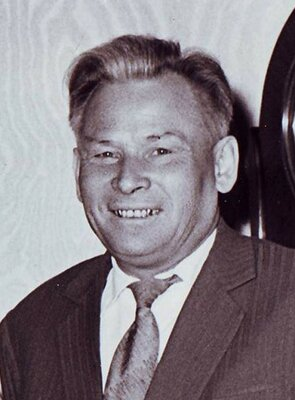
Chernenko in 1962

The turning point in Chernenko's career was his assignment in 1948 to head the Communist Party's propaganda department in the Moldavian Soviet Socialist Republic. There, he met and won the confidence of Leonid Brezhnev, the first secretary of the Moldavian branch of the Communist Party from 1950 to 1952 and future leader of the Soviet Union. Chernenko followed Brezhnev in 1956 to fill a similar propaganda post in the CPSU Central Committee in Moscow. In 1960 after Brezhnev was named chairman of the Presidium of the Supreme Soviet (i.e. the titular head of state of the Soviet Union), Chernenko became his chief of staff.

In 1965, Chernenko was nominated head of the General Department of the Central Committee, and given the mandate to set the Politburo agenda as well as prepare drafts of numerous Central Committee decrees and resolutions. He also monitored telephone wiretaps and covert listening devices in various offices of the top Party members. Another of his jobs was to sign hundreds of Party documents daily, a job he did for the next 20 years. Even after he became General Secretary of the Party, he continued to sign papers referring to the General Department (when he could no longer physically sign documents, a facsimile was used instead).

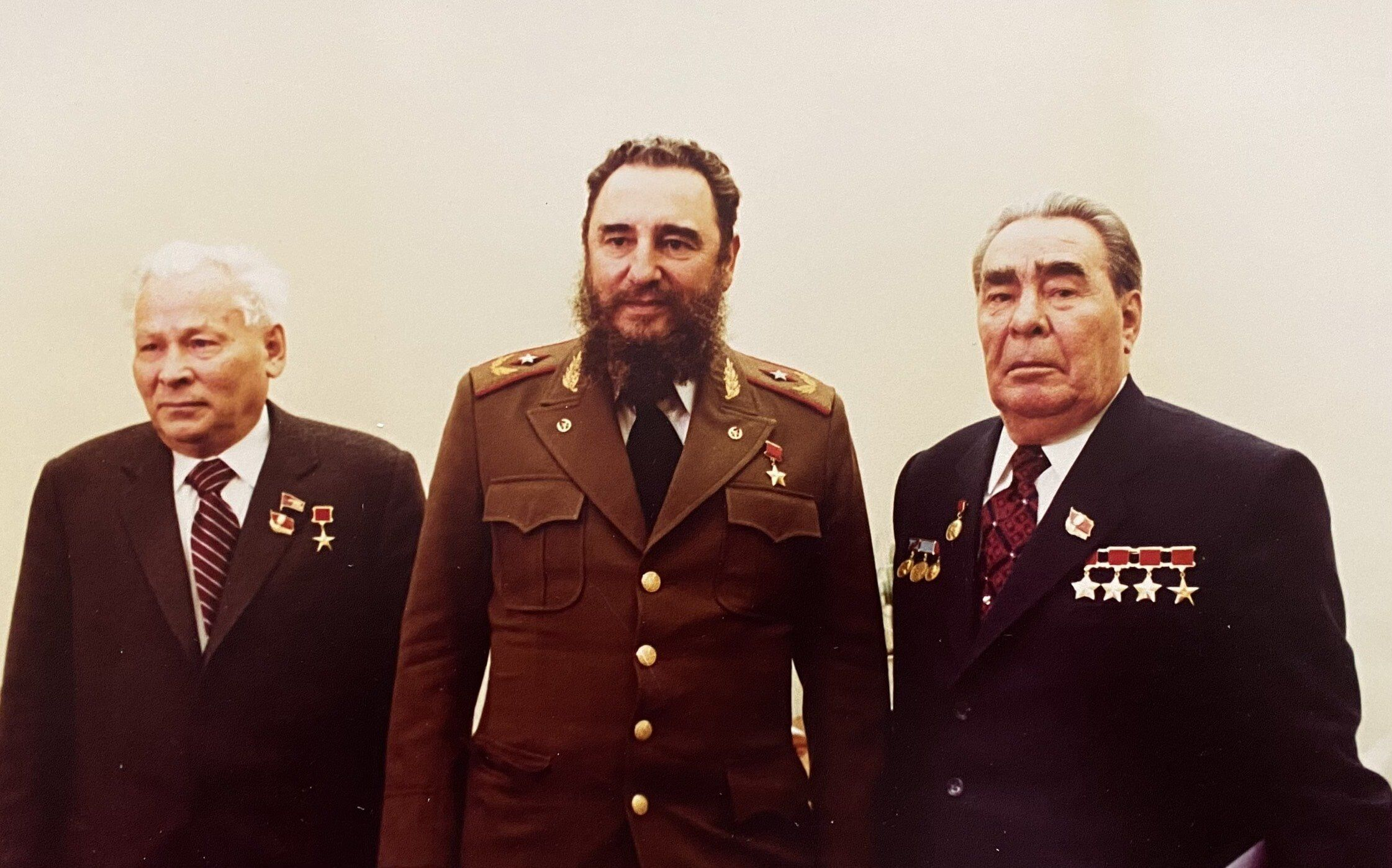
Chernenko (left) posing for a photo with his longtime patron, Leonid Brezhnev, and Fidel Castro in 1981.

In 1971, Chernenko was promoted to full membership in the Central Committee: overseeing Party work over the Letter Bureau, dealing with correspondence. In 1976 he was elected secretary of the Letter Bureau. He became Candidate in 1977, and in 1978 a full member of the Politburo, second to the General Secretary in the Party hierarchy.

During Brezhnev's final years, Chernenko became fully immersed in ideological Party work: heading Soviet delegations abroad, accompanying Brezhnev to important meetings and conferences, and working as a member of the commission that revised the Soviet Constitution in 1977. In 1979, he took part in the Vienna arms limitation talks.

After Brezhnev's death in November 1982, there was speculation that the position of General Secretary would fall to Chernenko, but he was unable to rally enough support for his candidacy. Ultimately, KGB chief Yuri Andropov eventually won the position.

== Leader of the Soviet Union (1984–1985) ==
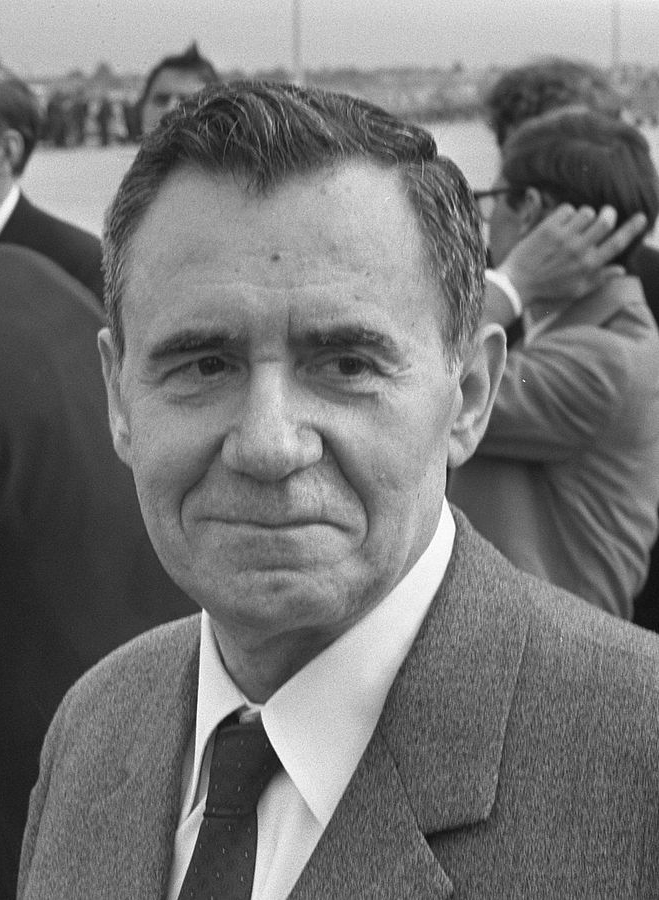
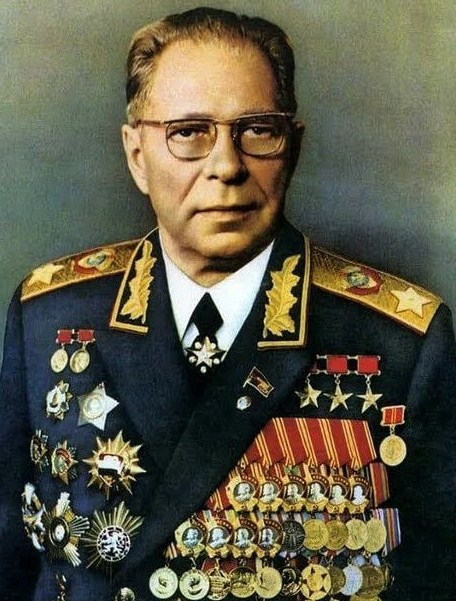
As a result of Chernenko's weak hold on power, Foreign Minister Gromyko (left) and Defense Minister Ustinov (right) held enormous influence over Soviet policy throughout his leadership.

Yuri Andropov died on 9 February 1984 at age 69 in Moscow Central Clinical Hospital of kidney failure. Chernenko was then elected to replace Andropov even though the latter stated he wanted Mikhail Gorbachev to succeed him. Chernenko was also terminally ill himself.

At the time of his ascent to the country's top post, Chernenko was primarily viewed as a transitional leader who could give the Politburo's "Old Guard" time to choose an acceptable candidate from the next generation of Soviet leadership. In the interim, Chernenko's authority was severely limited by his lack of support within the party and his deteriorating health which led him to miss meetings with increasing frequency. At Andropov's funeral, he could barely read the eulogy. Therefore, he was forced to govern the country as part of a triumvirate alongside Defense Minister Dmitriy Ustinov and Foreign Minister Andrei Gromyko. According to historian Vladislav M. Zubok, "Ustinov and Gromyko retained a virtual monopoly in [Soviet] military and foreign affairs" as a result of Chernenko's feeble hold on power.

Chernenko represented a return to the policies of the late Brezhnev era. Nevertheless, he supported a greater role for the labour unions, and reform in education and propaganda. The one major personnel change Chernenko made was the dismissal of the Chief of the General Staff, Marshal Nikolai Ogarkov. Ogarkov was subsequently replaced by Marshal Sergey Akhromeyev.

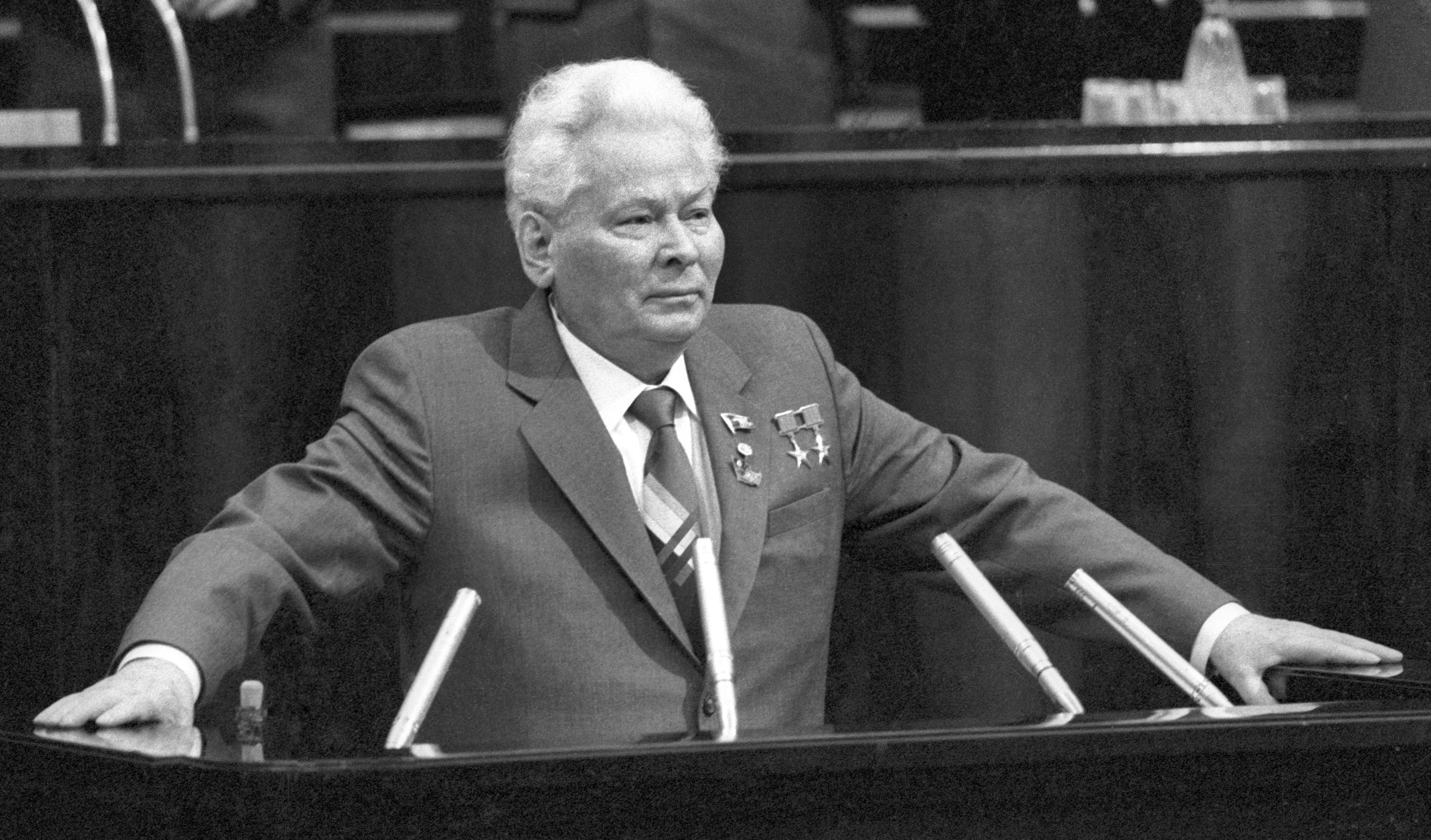
Chernenko addresses Komsomol leaders in his capacity as General Secretary in 1984.

In foreign policy, he negotiated a trade deal with China. Despite calls for renewed détente, Chernenko did little to prevent the escalation of the Cold War with the United States. For example, in 1984 the Soviet Union prevented a visit to West Germany by East German leader Erich Honecker. However, in late autumn of 1984, the U.S. and the Soviet Union did agree to resume arms control talks in early 1985. In November 1984 Chernenko met with Britain's Labour Party leader, Neil Kinnock.

In 1980 the United States led an international boycott of the Summer Olympics held in Moscow in protest at the Soviet invasion of Afghanistan. The following 1984 Summer Olympics were due to be held in Los Angeles, California. On 8 May 1984, under Chernenko's leadership, the USSR announced its intention not to participate in the Games, claiming "security concerns and chauvinistic sentiments and an anti-Soviet hysteria being whipped up in the United States". The boycott was joined by 14 Eastern Bloc satellites and allies, including Cuba (but not Romania). The action was widely seen as revenge for the U.S.-led boycott of the Moscow Games. The boycotting countries organised their own "Friendship Games" in the summer of 1984.

Before his death, Chernenko signed preliminary documents stating that on 9 May 1985, on the day of the 40th Victory Day Parade, the city of Volgograd would be renamed to Stalingrad. In his letter to Stalin's daughter Svetlana Alliluyeva, he wrote about "the upcoming restoration of justice in relation to the memory and heritage of I.V. Stalin", which presumably referred to Stalin's political rehabilitation.

== Health problems, death and legacy ==
Chernenko started smoking at the age of nine, and he was always known to be a heavy smoker as an adult. Long before his election as general secretary, he had developed emphysema and right-sided heart failure. In 1983, he had been absent from his duties for three months due to bronchitis, pleurisy and pneumonia. Historian John Lewis Gaddis described him as "an enfeebled geriatric so zombie-like as to be beyond assessing intelligence reports, alarming or not" when he succeeded Andropov in 1984.

In early 1984, Chernenko was hospitalized for over a month but kept working by sending the Politburo notes and letters. During the summer, his doctors sent him to Kislovodsk for the mineral spas, but on the day of his arrival at the resort Chernenko's health deteriorated, and he contracted pneumonia. Chernenko did not return to the Kremlin until later in 1984. He awarded Orders to cosmonauts and writers in his office, but was unable to walk through the corridors and was driven in a wheelchair. By the end of 1984, Chernenko could hardly leave the Central Clinical Hospital, a heavily guarded facility in west Moscow, and the Politburo was affixing a facsimile of his signature to all letters, as Chernenko had done with Andropov's when he was dying. Chernenko's illness was first acknowledged publicly on 22 February 1985 by the First Secretary of the Moscow City Committee, Viktor Grishin, during a televised election rally in Kuibyshev Borough of northeast Moscow. Two days later, in a televised scene that shocked the nation, Grishin dragged the terminally ill Chernenko from his hospital bed to a ballot box to vote. On 28 February 1985, Chernenko appeared once more on television to receive parliamentary credentials and read out a brief statement on his electoral victory: "the election campaign is over and now it is time to carry out the tasks set for us by the voters and the Communists who have spoken out".

Emphysema and the associated lung and heart damage worsened significantly for Chernenko in the last three weeks of February 1985. According to the Chief Kremlin doctor, Yevgeniy Chazov, Chernenko had also developed both chronic hepatitis and cirrhosis of the liver. On 10 March at 15:00, Chernenko fell into a coma and died later that evening. An autopsy revealed the cause of death to be a combination of chronic emphysema, an enlarged and damaged heart, congestive heart failure and liver cirrhosis. A three-day period of mourning across the country was announced. India, Brazil, Iraq, Syria and Nicaragua all declared three days of mourning; Pakistan North Korea and Guinea-Bissau declared two days of mourning; East Germany, Yugoslavia and Czechoslovakia declared one day of mourning.

Chernenko became the third Soviet leader to die in two and a half years. Upon being informed in the middle of the night of his death, U.S. President Ronald Reagan is reported to have remarked, "How am I supposed to get anyplace with the Russians if they keep dying on me?"

Chernenko was honored with a state funeral and is buried in the Kremlin Wall Necropolis, in one of the twelve individual tombs located between the Lenin Mausoleum and the Kremlin Wall. He is the last person to have been interred there.

The impact of Chernenko—or the lack thereof—was evident in the way in which his death was reported in the Soviet press. Soviet newspapers carried stories about Chernenko's death and Gorbachev's selection on the same day. The papers had the same format: page 1 reported the party Central Committee session on 11 March that elected Mikhail Gorbachev and printed the new leader's biography and a large photograph of him; page 2 announced the demise of Chernenko and printed his obituary.

After the death of a Soviet leader it was customary for his successors to open his safe. When Gorbachev had Chernenko's safe opened, it was found to contain a small folder of personal papers and several large bundles of money; more money was found in his desk. It is not known where he had obtained the money or what he intended to use it for.

== Honors and awards ==
- Hero of Socialist Labour, three times (1976, 1981, 1984)
- Order of Lenin, four times (1971, 1976, 1981, 1984)
- Order of the Red Banner of Labour, three times (1949, 1957, 1965)
- Medal "For Valiant Labour in the Great Patriotic War 1941–1945" (1945)
- Jubilee Medal "In Commemoration of the 100th Anniversary of the Birth of Vladimir Ilyich Lenin" (1969)
- Jubilee Medal "Thirty Years of Victory in the Great Patriotic War 1941–1945" (1975)
- Jubilee Medal "60 Years of the Armed Forces of the USSR" (1978)
- Lenin Prize (1982)
- USSR State Prize (1982)
- Order of Karl Marx (East Germany)
- Order of Georgi Dimitrov (Bulgaria)
- Order of Klement Gottwald (Czechoslovakia)
- Order of Sukhbaatar (Mongolia)

== Personal life ==
Chernenko had a son with his first wife, Faina Vassilyevna Chernenko, named Albert. With his second wife, Anna Dmitrevna Lyubimova, who married him in 1944, he had two daughters, Yelena and Vera, and a son, Vladimir. In 2015 archival documents were published, according to which Chernenko had other wives, and more children with them; this circumstance, perhaps, was the reason for the slowing of Chernenko's career growth in the 1940s.

== Sources ==
- Bialer, Seweryn (1986). The Soviet Paradox: External Expansion, Internal Decline. London: I.B. Tauris & Co. Ltd. ISBN 1-85043-030-6.
- Brown, Archie (April 1984). "The Soviet Succession: From Andropov to Chernenko". World Today. 40: 134–141.
- Daniels, Robert V. (20 February 1984). "The Chernenko Comeback". New Leader. 67: 3–5.
- Halstead, John (May–June 1984). "Chernenko in Office". International Perspectives: 19–21.
- Meissner, Boris (April 1985). "Soviet Policy: From Chernenko to Gorbachev". Aussenpolitik. 36 (4). Bonn: 357–375.
- Miles, Simon (2020). Engaging the Evil Empire: Washington, Moscow, and the Beginning of the End of the Cold War. Cornell University Press. ISBN 9781501751707.
- Mitchell, R. Judson (1990). Getting to the Top in the USSR: Cyclical Patterns in the Leadership Succession Process. Hoover Institution Press. ISBN 0-8179-8921-8.
- Ostrovsky, Alexander (2010). Кто поставил Горбачёва? (Who put Gorbachev?) — М.: Алгоритм-Эксмо, 2010. — 544 с. ISBN 978-5-699-40627-2.
- Pribytkov, Victor (December 1985). "Soviet-U.S. Relations: The Selected Writings and Speeches of Konstantin U. Chernenko". American Political Science Review. 79 (4): 1277. doi:10.2307/1956397. JSTOR 1956397. S2CID 161571675.
- Urban, Michael E. (1986). "From Chernenko to Gorbachev: A Repolitization of Official Soviet Discourse". Soviet Union/Union Soviétique. 13 (2): 131–161.
- Volkogonov, Dmitri. (1998), The Rise and Fall of the Soviet Empire. pp 383–431.
- Zemtsov, Ilya. Chernenko: The Last Bolshevik: The Soviet Union on the Eve of Perestroika (1989), 308p. covers 1970 to 1985.

Party political offices
Preceded by Yuri Andropov	General Secretary of the Communist Party of the Soviet Union; 13 February 1984 – 10 March 1985	Succeeded by Mikhail Gorbachev
Preceded by Yuri Andropov	Second Secretary of the Communist Party of the Soviet Union; 10 November 1982 – 9 February 1984	Succeeded by Mikhail Gorbachev
Preceded by Mikhail Suslov	Senior Secretary of Ideology of the Communist Party of the Soviet Union; 25 January 1982 – 24 May 1982	Succeeded by Yuri Andropov
Preceded by Andrei Kirilenko	Senior Secretary of Cadres for the Communist Party of the Soviet Union; March 1976 – January 1983	Succeeded by Mikhail Gorbachev
Government offices
Preceded by Yuri Andropov	Chairman of the Presidium of the Supreme Soviet; 11 April 1984 – 10 March 1985	Succeeded by Andrei Gromyko
Sporting positions
Preceded by (Canada) Jean Doré	President of Organizing Committee for Summer Olympic Games; 1980	Succeeded by (United States) Peter Ueberroth
