= Zezezino =

Rural locality in Idrinsky District, Russia

Coordinates: 54°33′43″N 092°26′19″E

Zezezino (Russian: Зезезино) is a rural locality (a village) in Idrinsky District of Krasnoyarsk Krai, Russia.
