= Yemelyanovo, Krasnoyarsk Krai =

Yemelyanovo Емельяново
- Urban-type settlement
- Interactive map of Yemelyanovo
- Location of Yemelyanovo Yemelyanovo (Krasnoyarsk Krai)
- Coordinates: 56.1670°N 92.6858°E
- Country: Russia
- Federal subject: Krasnoyarsk Krai
- Administrative district: Yemelyanovsky District
- Founded: 1700

Population (2010 Census)
  - Total: 12,055
  - Estimate (2025): 15,637 (+29.7%)
- Time zone: UTC+7 (MSK+4)
- Postal code: 663020
- OKTMO ID: 04614151051

Yemelyanovo (Russian: Емелья́ново) is an urban locality (an urban-type settlement) in Yemelyanovsky District of Krasnoyarsk Krai, Russia. Population: 12,055 (2010 census); 11,919 (2002 census); 15,408 (1989 Soviet census).
