= Albert Chernenko =

Russian philosopher (1935–2009)

Albert Konstantinovich Chernenko (Russian: Альберт Константинович Черненко; 6 January 1935 – 11 April 2009) was a Russian philosopher, best known for his innovations in the field of social and legal philosophy. He was the son of Konstantin Chernenko, the fifth General Secretary of the Communist Party of the Soviet Union, and Faina Chernenko.

During the rule of the Soviet Union, Chernenko created the theory of "historical causality," which asserts that the multilevel nature of cause-effect relationships plays a significant part in historical processes. This was an essential step in the development of the Soviets' understanding of historical events. According to Chernenko, causality in history has three levels of self-development: "general" (the building of a concrete formation), "special" (historical conditions), and "individual" (actions of historic figures).

In the early 1990s, he developed the idea of "legal technology," in which the methodology of social engineering is used to design social processes and to reform a social system. The purpose of legal technology, according to Chernenko, is the creation of a rational and effective legal system in light of the multilevel nature of causality and system-substantial understanding of the right. In this sense as the social phenomenon has the right not only external (the social environment), but also internal potential of inconsistent "self-development", that allows to consider the legal phenomena in a context sociocultural determinations (at a macrolevel) and self-determinations (microlevel).
