= Kozulsky District =

Kozulsky District Козульский район (Russian)
- District
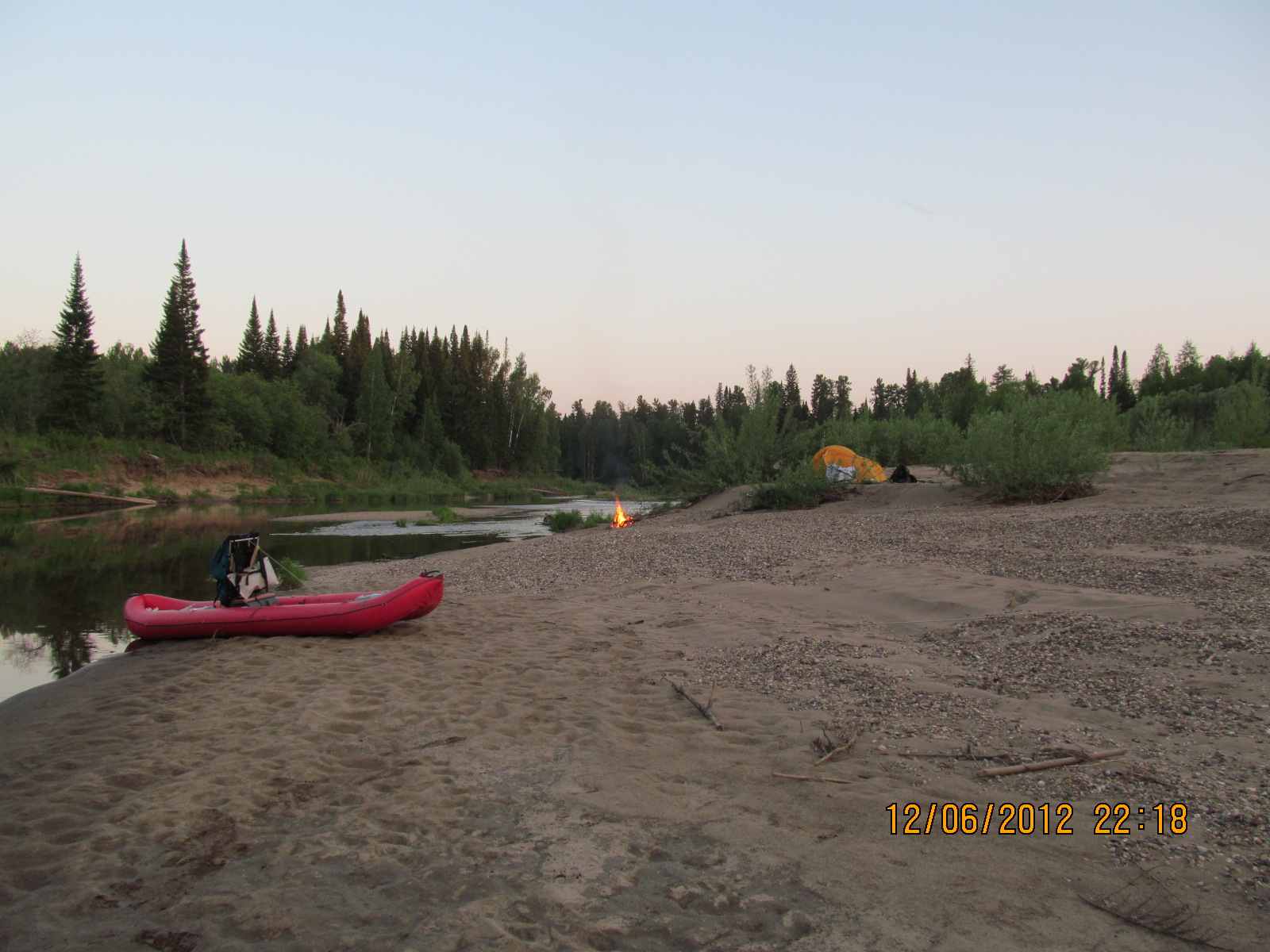
- Evening on a riverbank, Kozulsky District

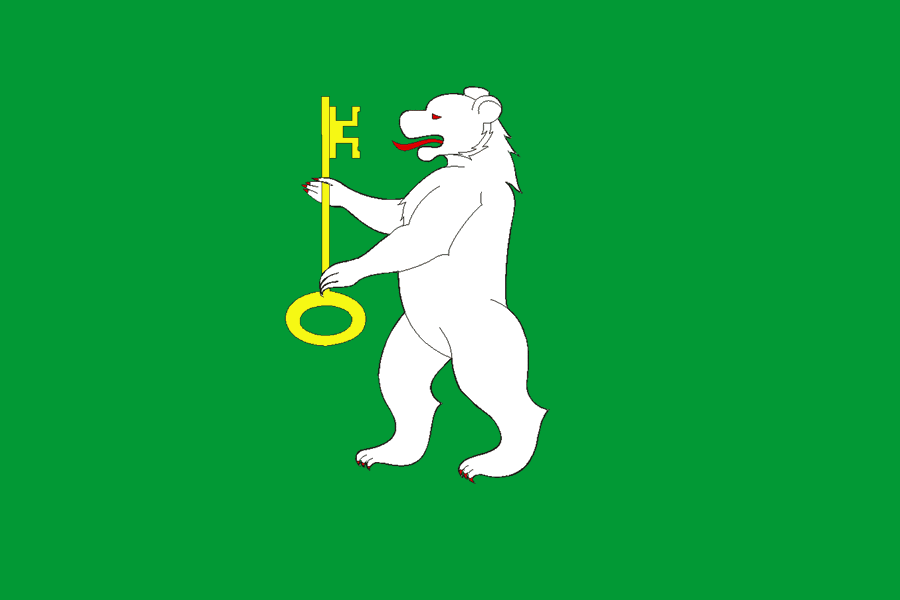
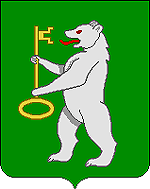
- Flag Coat of arms
- Location of Kozulsky District in Krasnoyarsk Krai
- Coordinates: 56°10′N 91°24′E
- Country: Russia
- Federal subject: Krasnoyarsk Krai
- Established: 1924
- Administrative center: Kozulka

Government
  - Type: Local government
  - Body: Kozulsky District Council of Deputies
  - Head: Igor V. Krivenkov

Area
  - Total: 5,305 km^{2} (2,048 sq mi)

Population (2010 Census)
  - Total: 16,689
  - Density: 3.146/km^{2} (8.148/sq mi)
  - Urban: 70.7%
  - Rural: 29.3%

Administrative structure
  - Administrative divisions: 2 Urban-type settlements, 5 Selsoviets
  - Inhabited localities: 2 urban-type settlements, 32 rural localities

Municipal structure
  - Municipally incorporated as: Kozulsky Municipal District
  - Municipal divisions: 2 urban settlements, 5 rural settlements
- Time zone: UTC+7 (MSK+4)
- OKTMO ID: 04626000
- Website: http://admkozulka.ru/

Kozulsky District (Russian: Козу́льский райо́н) is an administrative and municipal district (raion), one of the forty-three in Krasnoyarsk Krai, Russia. It is located in the southwest of the krai and borders with Birilyussky District in the north, Yemelyanovsky District in the east, Balakhtinsky District in the south, and with Nazarovsky, Achinsky and Bolsheuluysky Districts in the west. The area of the district is 5,305 square kilometers (2,048 sq mi). Its administrative center is the urban locality (an urban-type settlement) of Kozulka. Population: 16,689 (2010 census); 19,010 (2002 Census); 22,076 (1989 Soviet census). The population of Kozulka accounts for 47.9% of the district's total population.

== Government ==
As of 2013, the Head of District and the Chairman of the District Council is Igor V. Krivenkov.

== Economy ==
=== Transportation ===
The Trans-Siberian Railway runs through the district from west to east. A part of the federal highway M53 passes through the district as well.
