= Yemelyanovsky District =

Yemelyanovsky District Емельяновский район (Russian)
- District
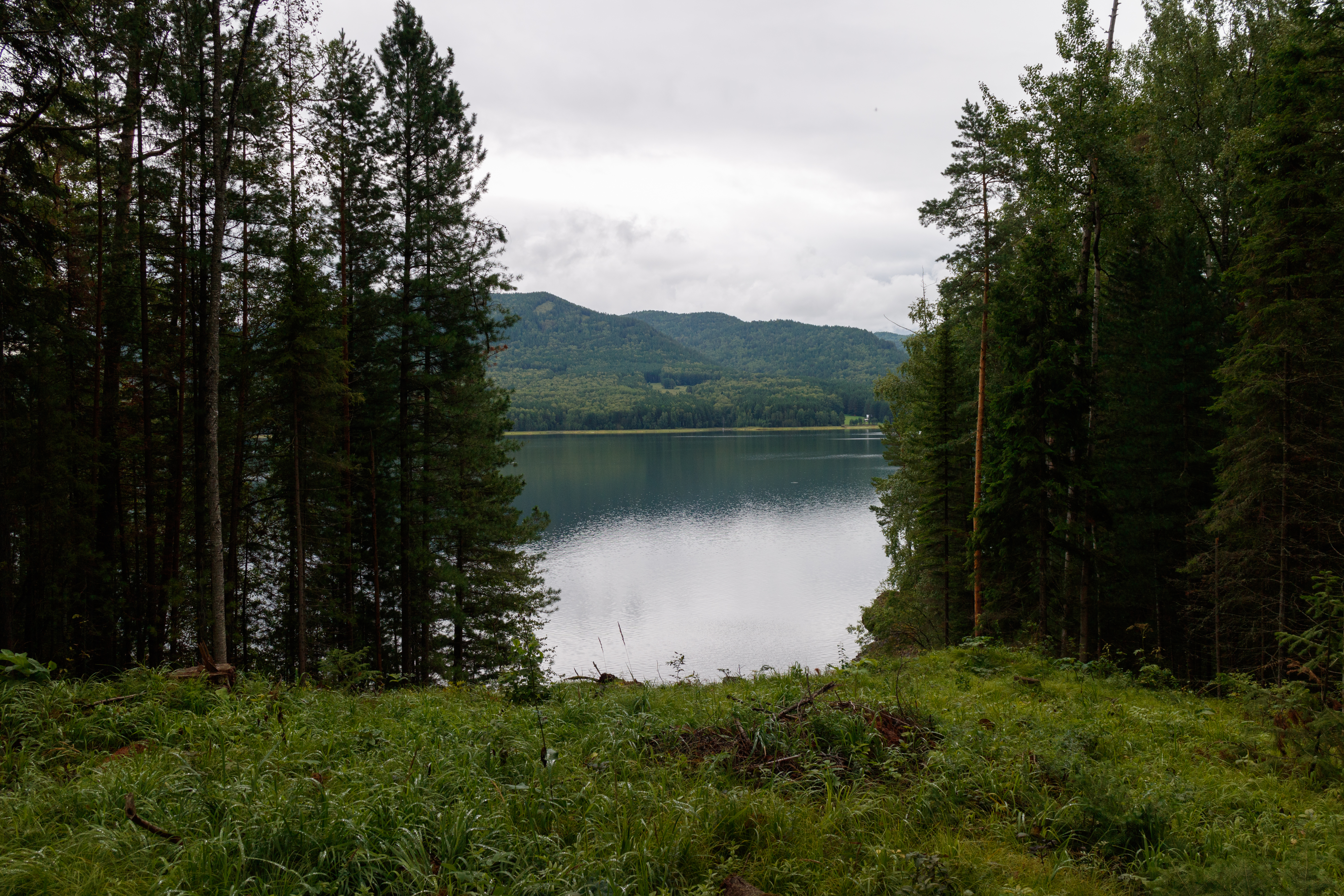
- Landscape in Yemelyanovsky District

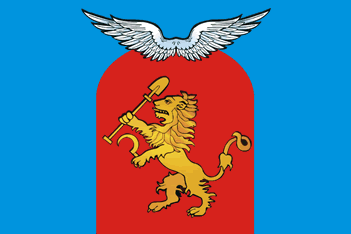
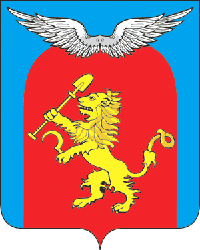
- Flag Coat of arms
- Location of Yemelyanovsky District in Krasnoyarsk Krai
- Coordinates: 56°10′14″N 92°40′20″E
- Country: Russia
- Federal subject: Krasnoyarsk Krai
- Established: May 3, 1938
- Administrative center: Yemelyanovo

Government
  - Type: Local government
  - Body: Yemelyanovsky District Council of Deputies
  - Head: Eduard G. Reyngardt

Area
  - Total: 7,441 km^{2} (2,873 sq mi)

Population (2010 Census)
  - Total: 50,998
  - Estimate (January 2011): 51,159
  - Density: 6.854/km^{2} (17.75/sq mi)
  - Urban: 38.7%
  - Rural: 61.3%

Administrative structure
  - Administrative divisions: 2 Urban-type settlements, 13 Selsoviets
  - Inhabited localities: 2 urban-type settlements, 63 rural localities

Municipal structure
  - Municipally incorporated as: Yemelyanovsky Municipal District
  - Municipal divisions: 1 urban settlements, 13 rural settlements
- Time zone: UTC+7 (MSK+4)
- OKTMO ID: 04614000
- Website: http://www.emelyanovo.ru/

Yemelyanovsky District (Russian: Емель́яновский райо́н) is an administrative and municipal district (raion), one of the forty-three in Krasnoyarsk Krai, Russia. It is located in the southern central part of the krai and borders with Bolshemurtinsky District in the north, Sukhobuzimsky District in the northeast, Beryozovsky District and the territory of the krai city of Krasnoyarsk in the east, Balakhtinsky District in the south, Kozulsky District in the west, and with Birilyussky District in the northwest. The area of the district is 7,441 square kilometers (2,873 sq mi). Its administrative center is the urban locality (an urban-type settlement) of Yemelyanovo. Population: 51,159 (2011 est.); 50,998 (2010 census); 45,656 (2002 Census); 48,375 (1989 Soviet census). The population of Yemelyanovo accounts for 23.6% of the district's total population.

== History ==
The district was founded on May 3, 1938.

== Administrative and municipal divisions ==
Within the framework of administrative divisions, Yemelyanovsky District is one of the forty-three in the krai. The urban-type settlement of Yemelyanovo serves as its administrative center. The district is divided into thirteen selsoviets and two urban-type settlements.

As a municipal division, the district is incorporated as Yemelyanovsky Municipal District and is divided into thirteen rural settlements (corresponding to the administrative district's selsoviets) and one urban settlement. Kedrovy Urban-Type Settlement, however, is incorporated separately from the municipal district as Kedrovy Urban Okrug.

== Government ==
As of 2013, the Head of the District and the Chairman of the District Council is Eduard G. Reyngardt. As of 2010, the District Council consists of twenty deputies.

== Transportation ==
The Trans-Siberian Railway runs through the district territory from west to east. A part of the federal highway M53 passes through the district as well.
