= Balakhtinsky District =

Balakhtinsky District Балахтинский район (Russian)
- District
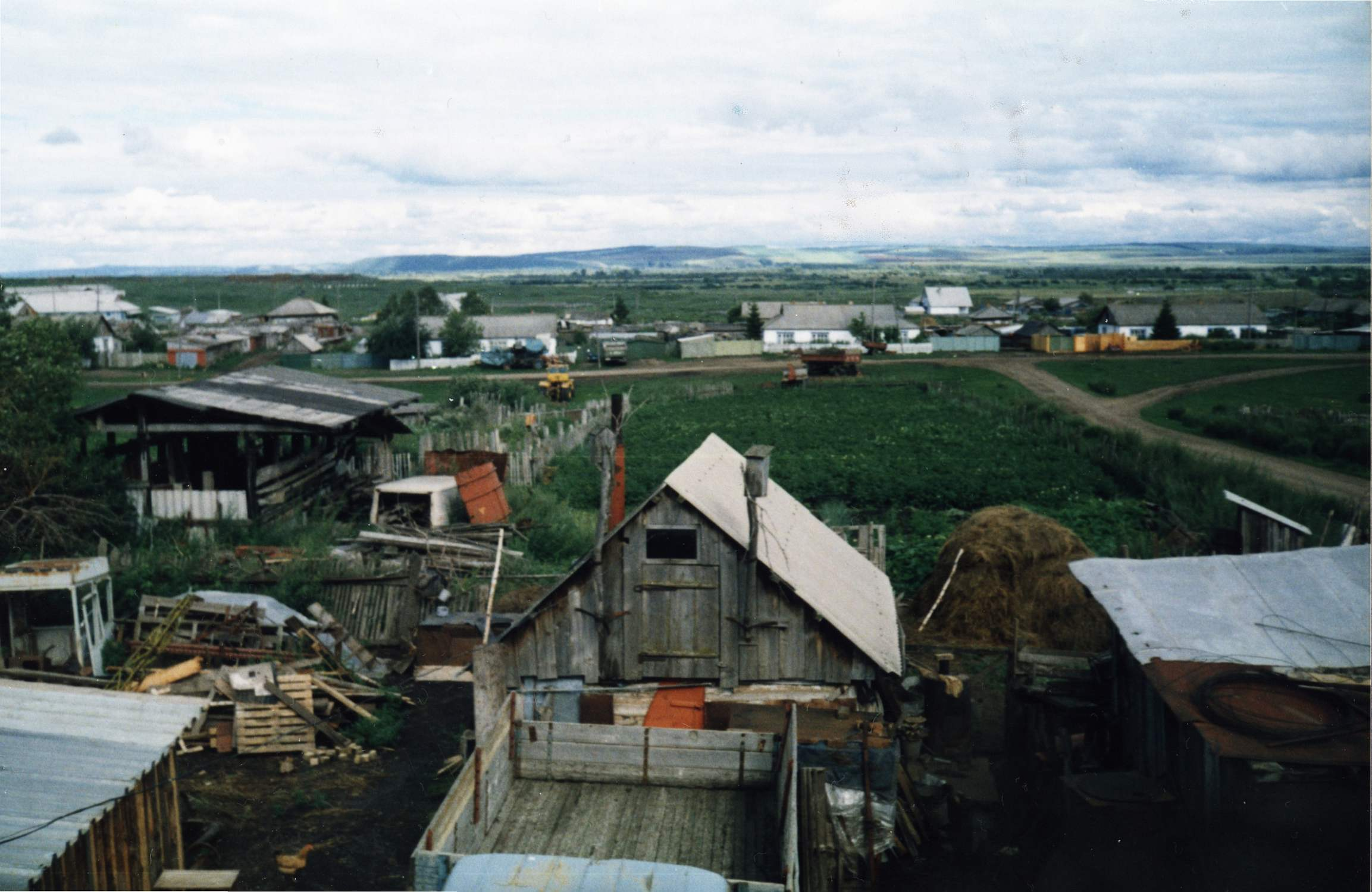
- Landscape in Balakhtinsky District

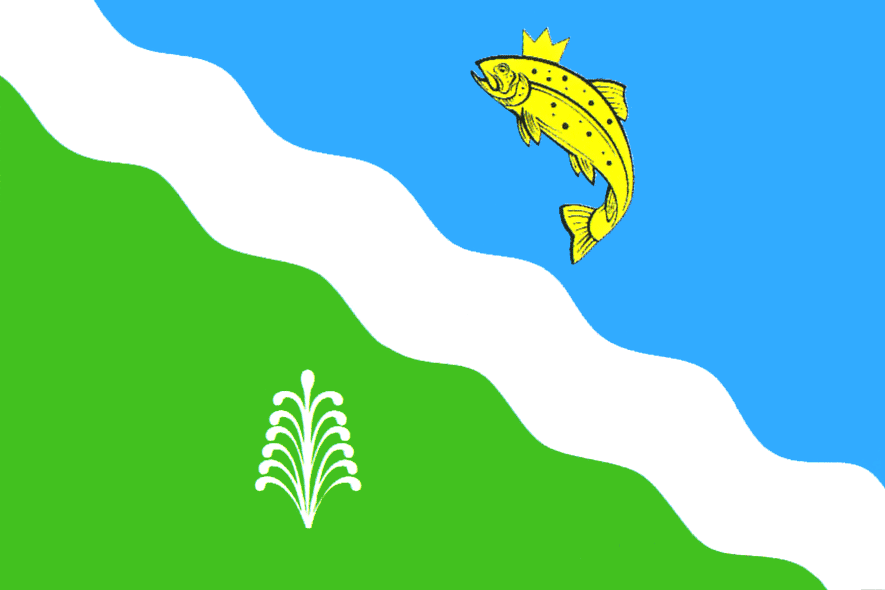
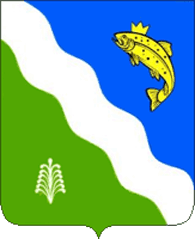
- Flag Coat of arms
- Location of Balakhtinsky District in Krasnoyarsk Krai
- Coordinates: 55°23′00″N 91°37′50″E
- Country: Russia
- Federal subject: Krasnoyarsk Krai
- Established: April 4, 1924
- Administrative center: Balakhta

Government
  - Type: Local government
  - Body: Balakhtinsky District Council of Deputies
  - Head: Nikolay M. Yurtayev

Area
  - Total: 10,250 km^{2} (3,960 sq mi)

Population (2010 Census)
  - Total: 21,000
  - Density: 2.0/km^{2} (5.3/sq mi)
  - Urban: 35.3%
  - Rural: 64.7%

Administrative structure
  - Administrative divisions: 1 Urban-type settlements, 12 Selsoviets
  - Inhabited localities: 1 urban-type settlements, 47 rural localities

Municipal structure
  - Municipally incorporated as: Balakhtinsky Municipal District
  - Municipal divisions: 1 urban settlements, 12 rural settlements
- Time zone: UTC+7 (MSK+4)
- OKTMO ID: 04604000
- Website: http://www.balahta.ru/

Balakhtinsky District (Russian: Балахти́нский райо́н) is an administrative and municipal district (raion), one of the forty-three in Krasnoyarsk Krai, Russia. It is located in the southwest of the krai and borders with Kozulsky and Yemelyanovsky Districts in the north, Beryozovsky District in the northeast, Mansky District in the east, Kuraginsky District in the southeast, Idrinsky, Krasnoturansky, and Novosyolovsky Districts in the south, Uzhursky District in the west, and with Nazarovsky District in the northwest. The area of the district is 10,250 square kilometers (3,960 sq mi). Its administrative center is the urban locality (an urban-type settlement) of Balakhta. Population: 21,000 (2010 census); 25,518 (2002 Census); 28,572 (1989 Soviet census). The population of Balakhta accounts for 35.3% of the district's total population.

== Geography ==
The district is situated in the valley between the Chulym and Yenisei Rivers.

== History ==
The district was founded on April 4, 1924.

== Government ==
As of 2013, the Head of the district is Nikolay M. Yurtayev.

== Demographics ==
As of the 2002 Census, the ethnic composition of the population was as follows:

- Russians: 86.4%
- Germans: 6.3%
- Chuvash: 1.8%
- Ukrainians: 1.4%
- Mordvins: 0.7%
- Belarusians: 0.6%
- Tatars: 0.5%
- Khakas: 0.1%

The rate of the natural decline of the district population was 4.3 persons per 1,000 in 2009, which is in sharp contrast to the krai's average increase of 0.2 persons per 1,000.
