= Krasnoturansky District =

Krasnoturansky District Краснотуранский район (Russian)
- District
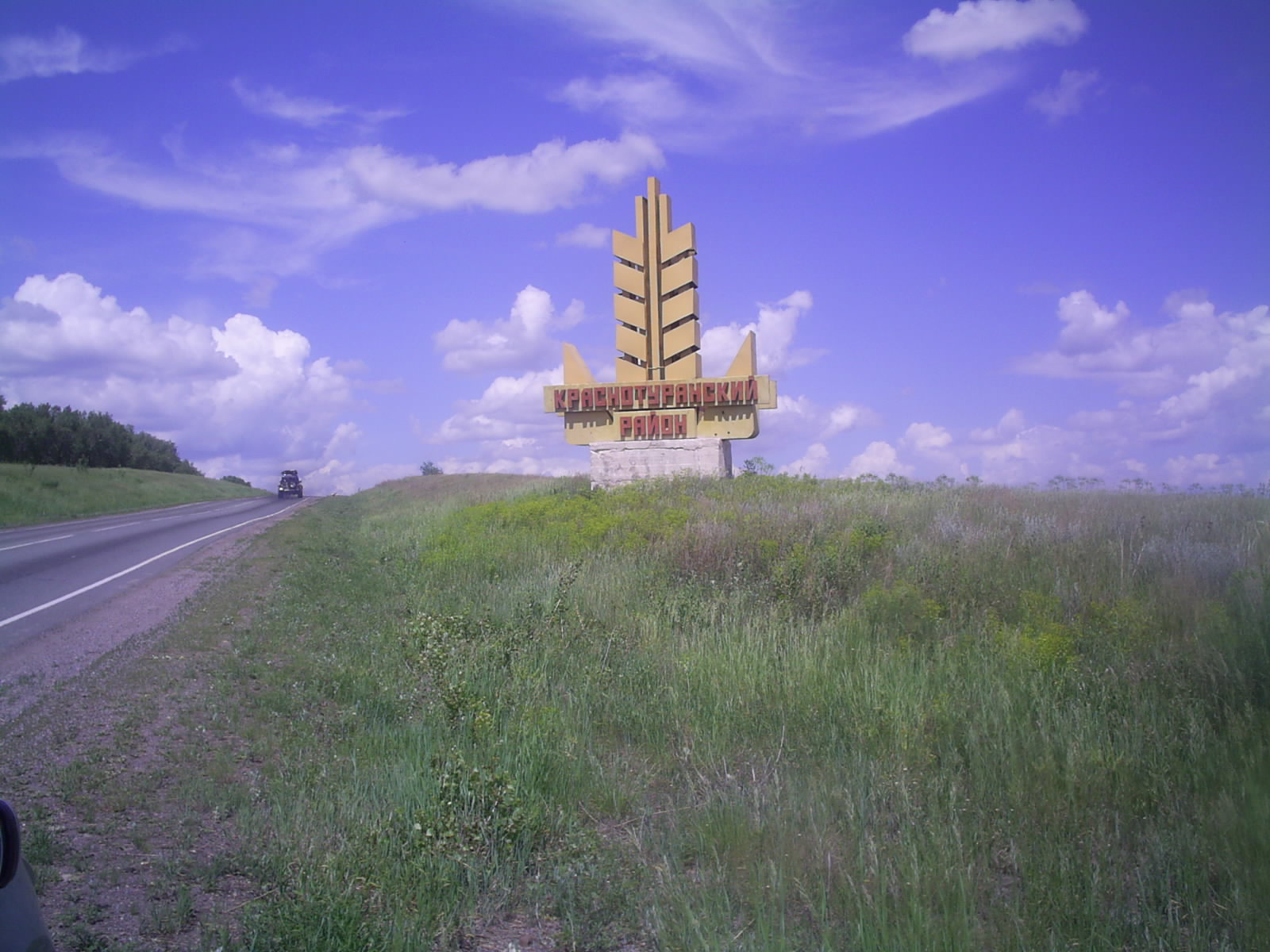
- Welcome sign at the entrance to Krasnoturansky District

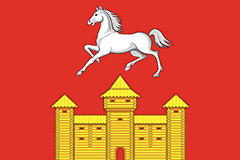
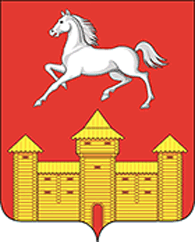
- Flag Coat of arms
- Location of Krasnoturansky District in Krasnoyarsk Krai
- Coordinates: 54°18′54″N 91°33′38″E
- Country: Russia
- Federal subject: Krasnoyarsk Krai
- Established: April 4, 1924
- Administrative center: Krasnoturansk

Government
  - Type: Local government
  - Body: Krasnoturansky District Council of Deputies
  - Head: Mikhail I. Kapturov

Area
  - Total: 3,462 km^{2} (1,337 sq mi)

Population (2010 Census)
  - Total: 15,562
  - Density: 4.495/km^{2} (11.64/sq mi)
  - Urban: 0%
  - Rural: 100%

Administrative structure
  - Administrative divisions: 9 selsoviet
  - Inhabited localities: 25 rural localities

Municipal structure
  - Municipally incorporated as: Krasnoturansky Municipal District
  - Municipal divisions: 0 urban settlements, 9 rural settlements
- Time zone: UTC+7 (MSK+4)
- OKTMO ID: 04628000
- Website: http://www.ktr24.ru/

Krasnoturansky District (Russian: Краснотура́нский райо́н) is an administrative and municipal district (raion), one of the forty-three in Krasnoyarsk Krai, Russia. It is located in the southwest of the krai and borders with Novosyolovsky District in the north, Balakhtinsky District in the northeast, Idrinsky District in the east, Kuraginsky District in the southeast, Minusinsky District in the south, and with the Republic of Khakassia in the west. The area of the district is 3,462 square kilometers (1,337 sq mi). Its administrative center is the rural locality (a selo) of Krasnoturansk. Population: 15,562 (2010 census); 17,322 (2002 Census); 18,629 (1989 Soviet census). The population of Krasnoturansk accounts for 37.2% of the district's total population.

== Geography ==
The district is located on the right bank of the Yenisei River.

== History ==
The district was founded on April 4, 1924.

== Government ==
The Head of the District and the Chairman of the District Council is Mikhail I. Kapturov.
