= Novobirilyussy =

Rural locality in Krasnoyarsk Krai, Russia

Coordinates: 56°57′21″N 90°40′51″E

Novobirilyussy (Russian: Новобирилю́ссы) is a rural locality (a selo) and the administrative center of Birilyussky District, Krasnoyarsk Krai, Russia. Population: 4,141 (2010 census); 4,342 (2002 census); 5,039 (1989 Soviet census).
