= Tyukhtet =

Rural locality in Krasnoyarsk Krai, Russia

Coordinates: 56°32′17″N 89°19′05″E

Tyukhtet (Russian: Тюхте́т) is a rural locality (a selo) and the administrative center of Tyukhtetsky District, Krasnoyarsk Krai, Russia. Population: 4,791 (2010 census); 5,219 (2002 census); 5,937 (1989 Soviet census).
