= Shalinskoye (rural locality) =

Rural locality in Krasnoyarsk Krai, Russia

Coordinates: 55°43′08″N 93°45′50″E

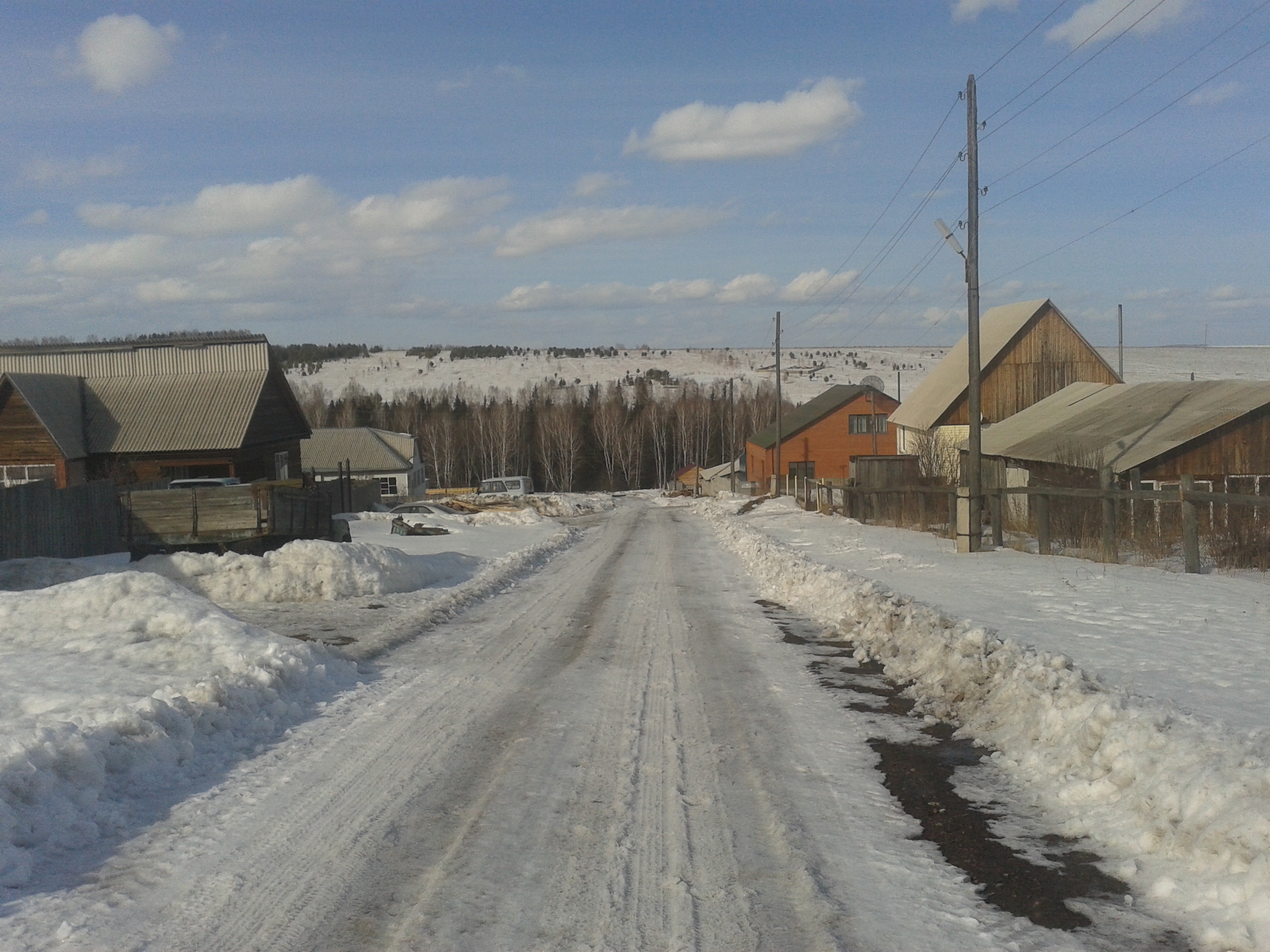

Shalinskoye (Russian: Ша́линское) is a rural locality (a selo) and the administrative center of Mansky District, Krasnoyarsk Krai, Russia. Population: 3,932 (2010 census); 4,264 (2002 census); 5,115 (1989 Soviet census).
