= Partizanskoye, Krasnoyarsk Krai =

Rural locality in Krasnoyarsk Krai, Russia

- Interactive map of Partizanskoye, Krasnoyarsk Krai
- Location of Partizanskoye, Krasnoyarsk Krai
- Coordinates: 55°29′58″N 94°23′42″E
- Country: Russia
- Federal subject: Krasnoyarsk Krai
- Founded: 1825

Population
  - Estimate (2010): 3,525 )
- Time zone: UTC+7 (MSK+4)
- Postal code: 663540
- OKTMO ID: 04643422101

Partizanskoye (Russian: Партиза́нское) is a rural locality (selo) and the administrative center of Partizansky District, Krasnoyarsk Krai, Russia.

Population: 3,525 (2010 census); 3,977 (2002 census); 5,049 (1989 Soviet census).

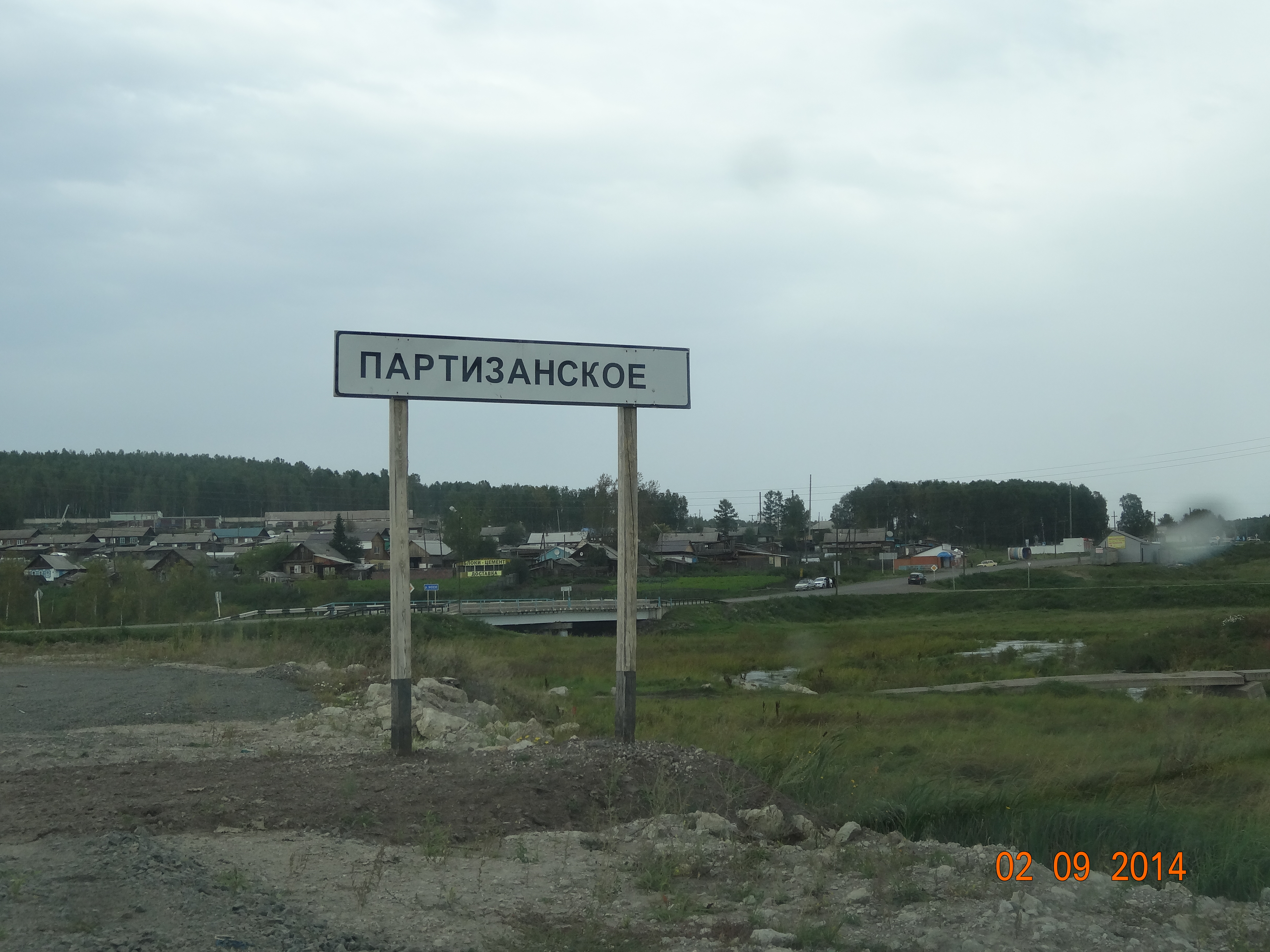
The village of Partizanskoye. A road bridge across the Noek River.
