= Yanov Stan =

Rural settlement in Turukhansky District, Krasnoyarsk Krai, Russia

Coordinates: 65°58′34″N 84°19′19″E

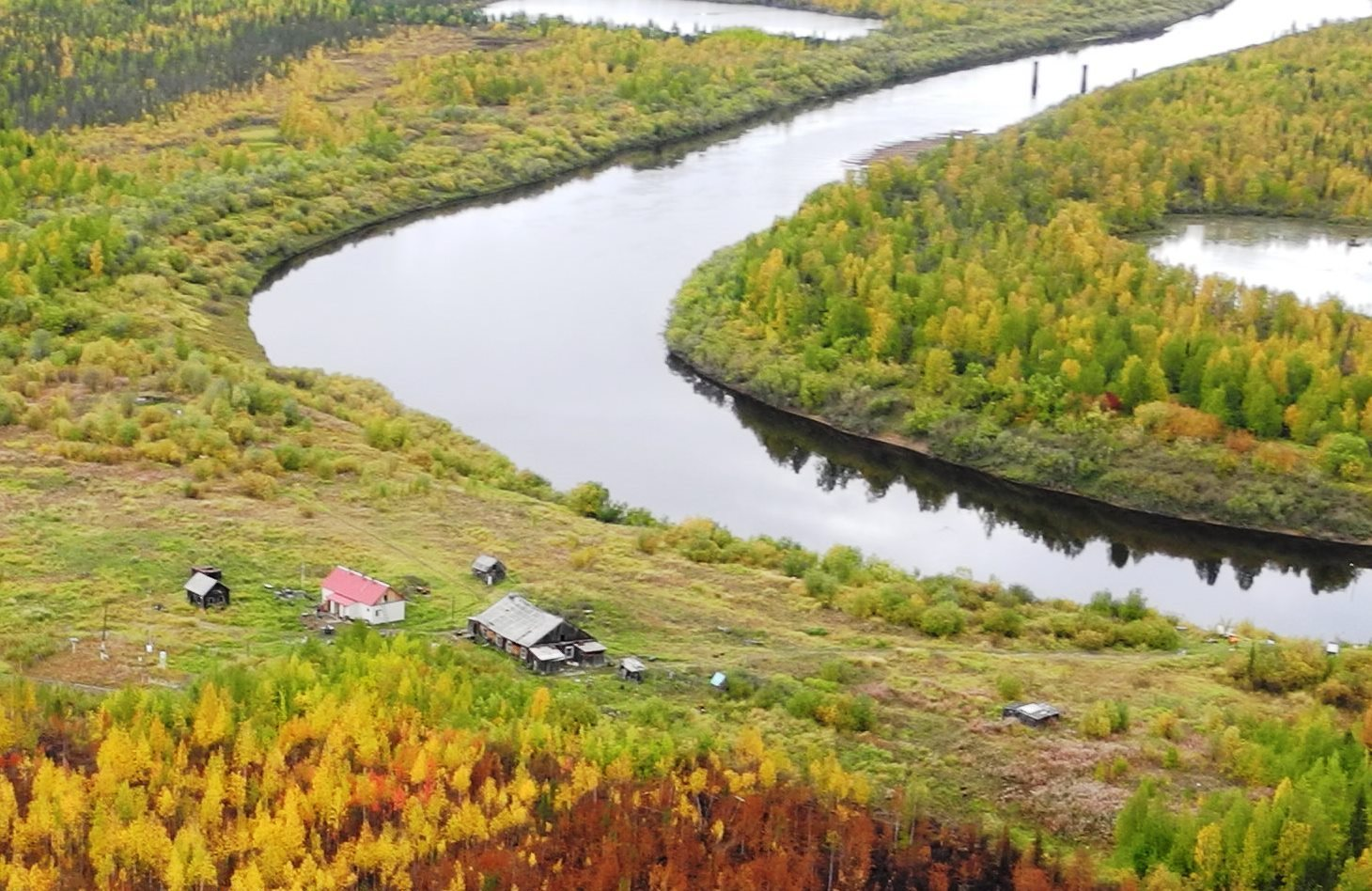
The Turukhan River flowing through Yanov Stan

Yanov Stan (Russian: Я́нов Стан) is a rural locality (a settlement) in Turukhansky District of Krasnoyarsk Krai, Russia, located in the upper flows of the Turukhan River, 240 kilometers (150 mi) from Turukhansk, the administrative center of the district, and 40 kilometers (25 mi) from the border with Krasnoselkupsky District in Yamalo-Nenets Autonomous Okrug. It had a population of 20 as of 2010.

Yanov Stan is home to an abandoned railway station on the unused branch of the Salekhard–Igarka Railway.

The climate is bone chilling subarctic (Köppen climate classification Dfc).

Climate data for Yanov Stan, Turuhansky district
Month	Jan	Feb	Mar	Apr	May	Jun	Jul	Aug	Sep	Oct	Nov	Dec	Year
Daily mean °C (°F)	−28.0 (−18.4)	−26.0 (−14.8)	−17.1 (1.2)	−9.7 (14.5)	−.7 (30.7)	10 (50)	15.4 (59.7)	11.6 (52.9)	4.9 (40.8)	−6.6 (20.1)	−19.8 (−3.6)	−24.8 (−12.6)	−7.6 (18.3)
Average precipitation mm (inches)	29.3 (1.15)	21.8 (0.86)	26.3 (1.04)	27.8 (1.09)	28.7 (1.13)	46.2 (1.82)	51.0 (2.01)	60.4 (2.38)	54.8 (2.16)	59.7 (2.35)	43.0 (1.69)	34.9 (1.37)	483.7 (19.04)
Mean daily daylight hours	6.1	9.2	12.7	16.6	20.5	23	21	18	13.9	10.4	7	4.8	13.6
