= Bolshoy Uluy =

Rural locality in Krasnoyarsk Krai, Russia

Coordinates: 56°39′18″N 90°34′25″E

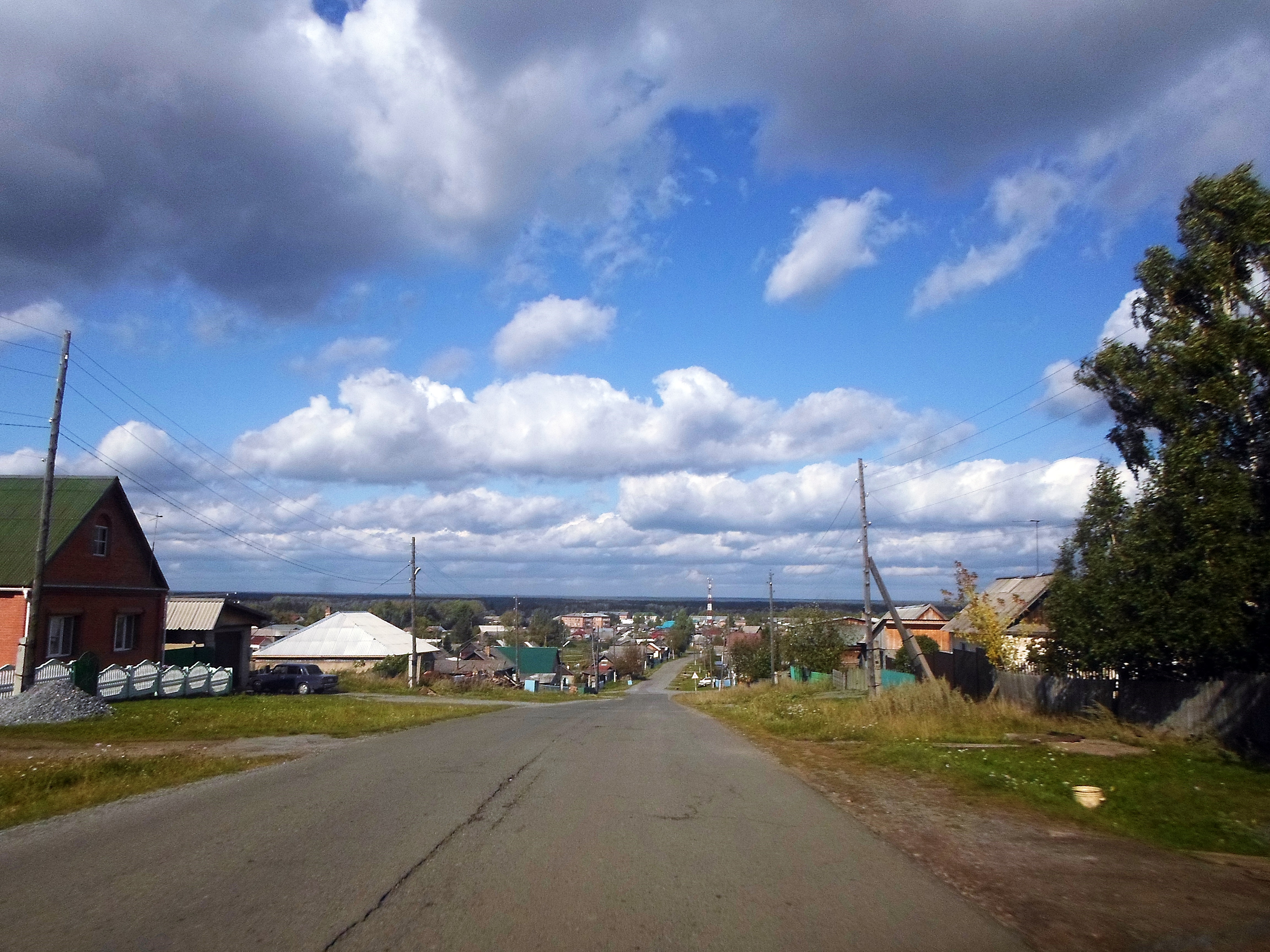
Street view

Bolshoy Uluy (Russian: Большо́й Улу́й) is a rural locality (a selo) and the administrative center of Bolsheuluysky District, Krasnoyarsk Krai, Russia. Population: 3,340 (2010 census); 3,417 (2002 census); 4,003 (1989 Soviet census).
