= Birilyussky District =

Birilyussky District Бирилюсский район (Russian)
- District
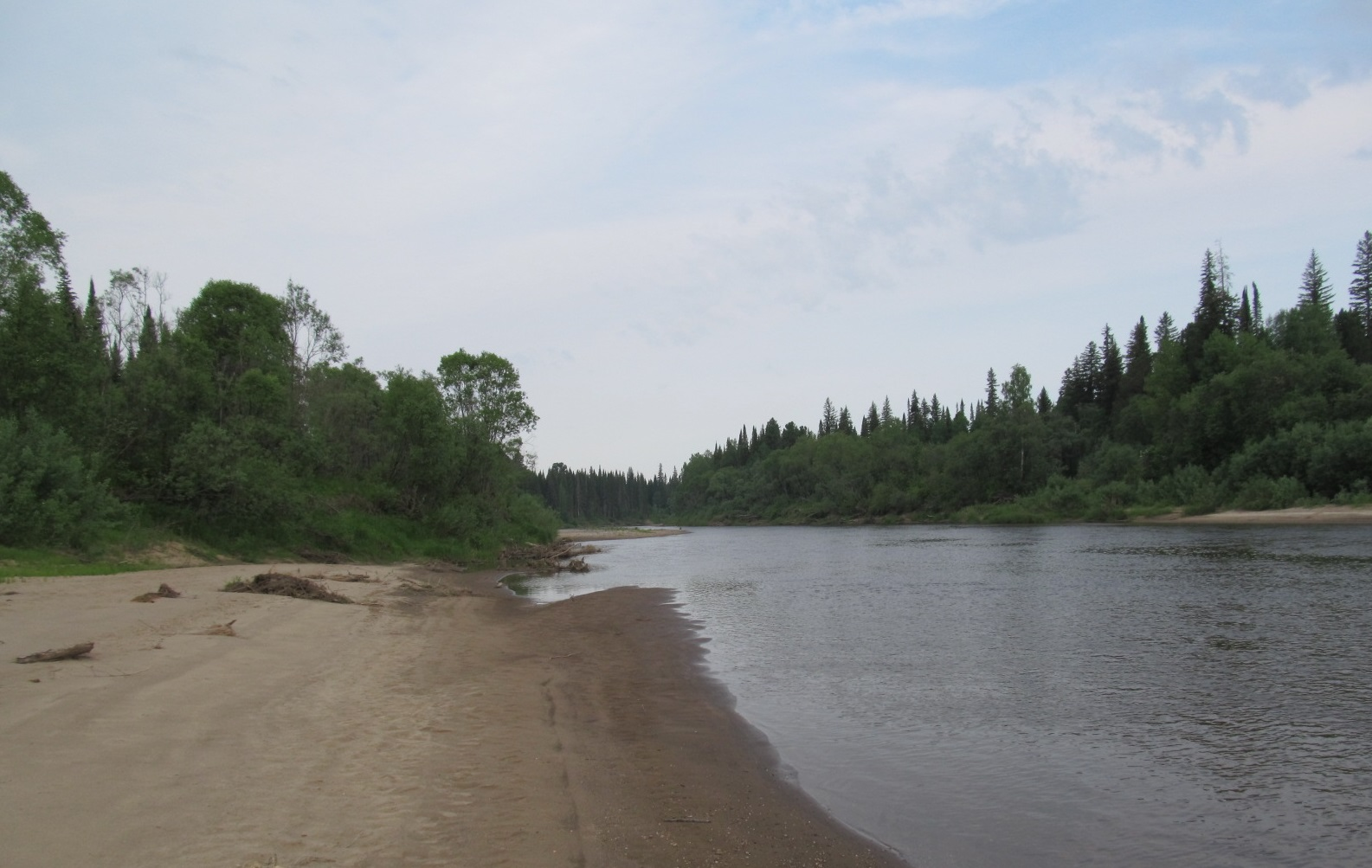
- Kemchug River, Birilyussky District

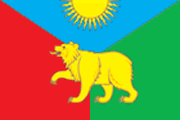
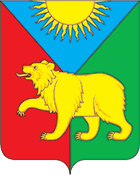
- Flag Coat of arms
- Location of Birilyussky District in Krasnoyarsk Krai
- Coordinates: 56°53′52″N 90°39′42″E
- Country: Russia
- Federal subject: Krasnoyarsk Krai
- Established: April 4, 1924
- Administrative center: Novobirilyussy

Government
  - Type: Local government
  - Body: Birilyussky District Council of Deputies
  - Head: Vladimir V. Belenya

Area
  - Total: 11,779 km^{2} (4,548 sq mi)

Population (2010 Census)
  - Total: 10,927
  - Density: 0.92767/km^{2} (2.4026/sq mi)
  - Urban: 25.1%
  - Rural: 74.9%

Administrative structure
  - Administrative divisions: 11 selsoviet
  - Inhabited localities: 42 rural localities

Municipal structure
  - Municipally incorporated as: Birilyussky Municipal District
  - Municipal divisions: 0 urban settlements, 11 rural settlements
- Time zone: UTC+7 (MSK+4)
- OKTMO ID: 04606000
- Website: http://www.birilussy.ru/

Birilyussky District (Russian: Бирилю́сский райо́н) is an administrative and municipal district (raion), one of the forty-three in Krasnoyarsk Krai, Russia. It is located in the southwest of the krai and borders with Yeniseysky District in the north, Pirovsky District in the northeast, Bolshemurtinsky and Yemelyanovsky Districts in the east, Bolsheuluysky and Kozulsky Districts in the south, and with Tyukhtetsky District in the west. The area of the district is 11,779 square kilometers (4,548 sq mi). Its administrative center is the rural locality (a selo) of Novobirilyussy. Population: 10,927 (2010 census); 13,090 (2002 Census); 16,806 (1989 Soviet census). The population of Novobirilyussy accounts for 37.9% of the district's total population.

== History ==
The district was founded on April 4, 1924.

== Government ==
As of 2013, the Head of the District and Chairman of the District Council is Vladimir V. Belenya.

== Education ==
There are twenty-two schools in the district, including nine secondary schools, two junior secondary schools, and eleven primary schools. In Novobirilyussy, there is also a correctional boarding school.

Other educational facilities include five pre-school centers, a youth activity center, youth sports club "Ares", and Professional Lyceum #40, which trains tractor maintenance technicians, agricultural equipment technicians, machinists, drivers, and tractor operators.

== Public health services ==
Medical services in the district are provided by the 95-bed Central District Hospital, 20-bed local hospital, and by 23 medical and obstetric centers.
