= Novosyolovo, Krasnoyarsk Krai =

Rural locality in Krasnoyarsk Krai, Russia

Coordinates: 55°00′08″N 90°58′48″E

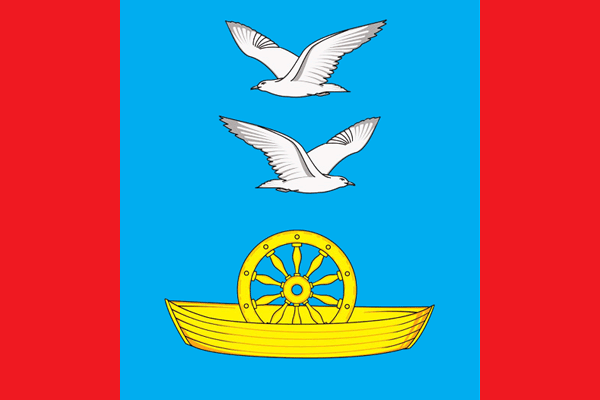
Flag of Novosyolovo

Novosyolovo (Russian: Новосёлово) is a rural locality (a selo) and the administrative center of Novosyolovsky District, Krasnoyarsk Krai, Russia. Population: 5,980 (2010 census); 6,350 (2002 census); 6,595 (1989 Soviet census).
