= Tyukhtetsky District =

Tyukhtetsky District Тюхтетский район (Russian)
- District
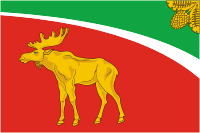
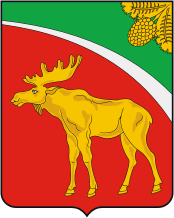
- Flag Coat of arms
- Location of Tyukhtetsky District in Krasnoyarsk Krai
- Coordinates: 56°31′48″N 89°18′36″E
- Country: Russia
- Federal subject: Krasnoyarsk Krai
- Established: May 25, 1925
- Administrative center: Tyukhtet

Government
  - Type: Local government
  - Body: Tyukhtetsky District Council of Deputies
  - Head: Gennady P. Dzalba

Area
  - Total: 9,339 km^{2} (3,606 sq mi)

Population (2010 Census)
  - Total: 8,858
  - Density: 0.9485/km^{2} (2.457/sq mi)
  - Urban: 0%
  - Rural: 100%

Administrative structure
  - Administrative divisions: 10 selsoviet
  - Inhabited localities: 34 rural localities

Municipal structure
  - Municipally incorporated as: Tyukhtetsky Municipal District
  - Municipal divisions: 0 urban settlements, 10 rural settlements
- Time zone: UTC+7 (MSK+4)
- OKTMO ID: 04655000
- Website: http://tuhtet-adm.ru/

Tyukhtetsky District (Russian: Тюхте́тский райо́н) is an administrative and municipal district (raion), one of the forty-three in Krasnoyarsk Krai, Russia. It is located in the southwest of the krai and borders with Yeniseysky District in the north, Birilyussky and Bolsheuluysky Districts in the east, Bogotolsky District in the south, and with Kemerovo and Tomsk Oblasts in the west. The area of the district is 9,339 square kilometers (3,606 sq mi). Its administrative center is the rural locality (a selo) of Tyukhtet. Population: 8,858 (2010 census); 10,386 (2002 Census); 12,814 (1989 Soviet census). The population of Tyukhtet accounts for 54.1% of the district's total population.

== History ==
The district was founded on May 25, 1925.

== Government ==
As of 2013, the Head of the district is Gennady P. Dzalba and the Chairman of the District Council is Viktor S. Petrovich.
