= Abalakovo, Irkutsk Oblast =

Abalakovo Абалаково
- Selo
- Location within Irkutsk Oblast Location within Russia
- Coordinates: 54°44′N 99°06′E
- Country: Russia
- Region: Irkutsk Oblast
- District: Nizhneudinsky District
- Time zone: [[UTC+8:00]]

Abalakovo (Russian: Абалаково) is a rural locality (a selo) in Nizhneudinsky District, Irkutsk Oblast, Russia. The population was 114 as of 2010. There are 3 streets.

== Geography ==
Abalakovo is located 21 km south of Nizhneudinsk (the district's administrative centre) by road. Solontsy is the nearest rural locality.
