= Abakumovka =

Abakumovka Абакумовка
- Village
- Location within Krasnoyarsk Krai Location within Russia
- Coordinates: 55°44′N 96°13′E
- Country: Russia
- Region: Krasnoyarsk Krai
- District: Ilansky District
- Time zone: UTC+3:00

Abakumovka (Russian: Абаку́мовка) is a rural locality (a village) in Novonikolayevsky Selsovet of Ilansky District, Krasnoyarsk Krai, Russia. The population was 6 as of 2010. There is 1 street.

== Geography ==
Abakumovka is located 63 km south of Ilansky (the district's administrative centre) by road. Roslyaki is the nearest rural locality.
