= Bolsheuluysky District =

Bolsheuluysky District Большеулуйский район (Russian)
- District
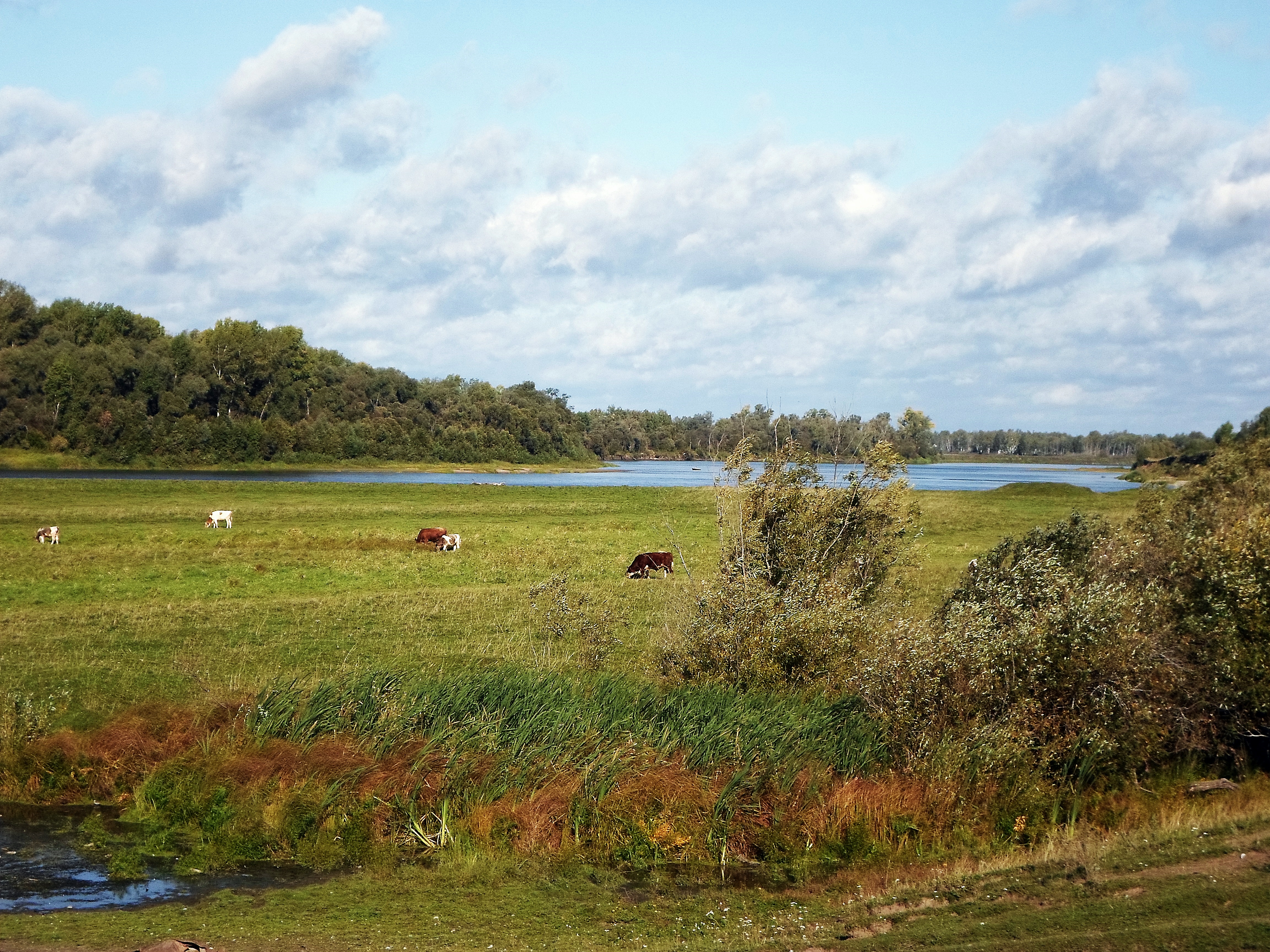
- Chulym River, Bolsheuluysky District

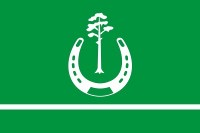
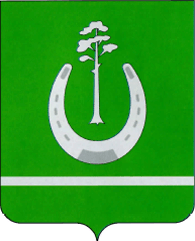
- Flag Coat of arms
- Location of Bolsheuluysky District in Krasnoyarsk Krai
- Coordinates: 56°39′26″N 90°34′37″E
- Country: Russia
- Federal subject: Krasnoyarsk Krai
- Established: April 4, 1924
- Administrative center: Bolshoy Uluy

Government
  - Type: Local government
  - Body: Bolsheuluysky District Council of Deputies
  - Head: Sergey A. Lyubkin

Area
  - Total: 2,708 km^{2} (1,046 sq mi)

Population (2010 Census)
  - Total: 7,658
  - Density: 2.828/km^{2} (7.324/sq mi)
  - Urban: 0%
  - Rural: 100%

Administrative structure
  - Administrative divisions: 9 selsoviet
  - Inhabited localities: 36 rural localities

Municipal structure
  - Municipally incorporated as: Bolsheuluysky Municipal District
  - Municipal divisions: 0 urban settlements, 9 rural settlements
- Time zone: UTC+7 (MSK+4)
- OKTMO ID: 04611000
- Website: http://www.buluy.achim.ru/

Bolsheuluysky District (Russian: Большеулу́йский райо́н) is an administrative and municipal district (raion), one of the forty-three in Krasnoyarsk Krai, Russia. It is located in the southwest of the krai and borders with Birilyussky District in the north, Kozulsky District in the east, Achinsky District in the south, Bogotolsky District in the southwest, and with Tyukhtetsky District in the west. The area of the district is 2,708 square kilometers (1,046 sq mi). Its administrative center is the rural locality (a selo) of Bolshoy Uluy. Population: 7,658 (2010 census); 8,948 (2002 Census); 10,758 (1989 Soviet census). The population of Bolshoy Uluy accounts for 43.6% of the district's total population.

== History ==
The district was founded on April 4, 1924.

== Government ==
The Head of the District and the Chairman of the District Council is Sergey A. Lyubkin.
