= Rybinsky (rural locality) =

Rybinsky (Russian: Рыбинский; masculine), Rybinskaya (Рыбинская; feminine), or Rybinskoye (Рыбинское; neuter) is the name of several rural localities in Russia:

- Rybinsky, Oryol Oblast, a settlement in Medvedkovsky Selsoviet of Bolkhovsky District of Oryol Oblast
- Rybinsky, Rostov Oblast, a khutor in Kalininskoye Rural Settlement of Sholokhovsky District of Rostov Oblast
