= Loshchinka =

Loshchinka Лощинка
- Village
- Location within Krasnoyarsk Krai Location within Russia
- Coordinates: 55°45′N 95°09′E
- Country: Russia
- Region: Krasnoyarsk Krai
- District: Rybinsky District, Krasnoyarsk Krai
- Time zone: UTC+7:00 (CET)

Loshchinka (Russian: Лощи́нка) is a village located in the Siberia taiga in Rybinsky District, Krasnoyarsk Krai, Russia. In 2018 and 2019, its population was around 25 residents. A state-owned sovkhoz existed nearby until the early 2000s, which formerly provided jobs for village residents. There is 4 streets.

As of 2018, foods are typically delivered to the village by truck, and water is pumped in via pipeline due to no wells existing in the village. Shops that used to exist had closed long ago. Most of the village's residents are highly reliant upon pension payments from the state, which provides a subsistence-level of income. As of 2018, a medical clinic exists, but it was reported that its owner has plans for retirement.
