= Poligus =

Poligus Полигус
- Selo
- Location of Poligus
- Location of Poligus Poligus (Krasnoyarsk Krai)
- Coordinates: 61°59′20″N 94°39′30″E
- Country: Russia
- Federal subject: Krasnoyarsk Krai
- Administrative district: Evenkiysky District
- Elevation: 140 m (460 ft)

Population (2010 Census)
  - Total: 302
  - Estimate (2015): 242
- Time zone: UTC+7 (MSK+4)
- Postal code(s): 648371
- OKTMO ID: 04650420101

Poligus (Russian: По́лигус) is a rural locality in Evenkiysky District of Krasnoyarsk Krai, Russia, located on the right bank of the Podkamennaya Tunguska River, 380 km from the district center. The village name is of Evenki origin, of a legendary Poligus shaman(Фёдор Полигус).

The village has a kindergarten, schools, district hospital, rural culture house, post office, shop, weather station, fuel storage.

== Population ==
The population of Poligus, as of January 1, 2015, was 242.

Population:

2012 - 282

2013 - 262

2014 - 244

2015 - 242

Population
2002	2005	2006	2007	2008	2009	2010
408	411	362	363	353	330	302

Ethnic structure (2005): Selkups 0, Kets 3, Evenkis 262.

According to another source: Russians 29%, Evenkis 67%, Ukrainians 4%.

According to the expedition of 2005 the demographic situation in Poligus: a population of 492 people, Evenki 292 people (59%). Intrafamily language transmission was interrupted. Children speak only Russian, although some know a small amount of Evenk words. Some young people understood some Evenki as well. Evenki language spoken only among the forty-fifty years generation. Some families live on deer keeping, but traditional economy can not prevent the loss of the ethnic language.

== History ==
A 1904, 1906, 1913 and 1923 ethnographic, scientific expeditions were led to the location by Alexei Makarenko (b. 1860) a Siberian studies ethnographer and writer .

In Soviet times, the local farm "Poligusovsky" (Полигусовский) kept up to 10 thousand reindeer. Today the main occupations include hunting, harvesting, purchasing, processing and fur marketing.

Status and borders of rural settlements established by the Law of the Krasnoyarsk Territory on October 6, 2011, No. 13–6271 "On establishing the boundaries of the municipality Evenk municipal district and located within its boundaries of other municipalities"

== Transportation ==
Poligus is served by the Poligus Airport (ПГУ), located 1 km from the center. Poligus Airport takes only domestic flights. It is also used for special and freight traffic.

== Climate ==
Poligus weather station has been established in 1959.

Generally, it is cold temperate in Poligus, with a great deal of rainfall, even in the driest month. The average annual temperature is −5.7 °C. The average annual rainfall is 539 mm. The least amount of rainfall occurs in February with the average of 20 mm. The greatest amount of precipitation occurs in August, with an average of 76 mm. The temperatures are highest on average in July, at around 17.1 °C. The lowest average temperatures occur in January, when it is around −28.5 °C. The variation in the precipitation between the driest and wettest months is 56 mm. The variation in temperatures throughout the year is 45.6 °C.

Poligus weather:
