= Krasnoturansk =

Rural locality in Krasnoyarsk Krai, Russia

Krasnoturansk Краснотуранск
- Settlement
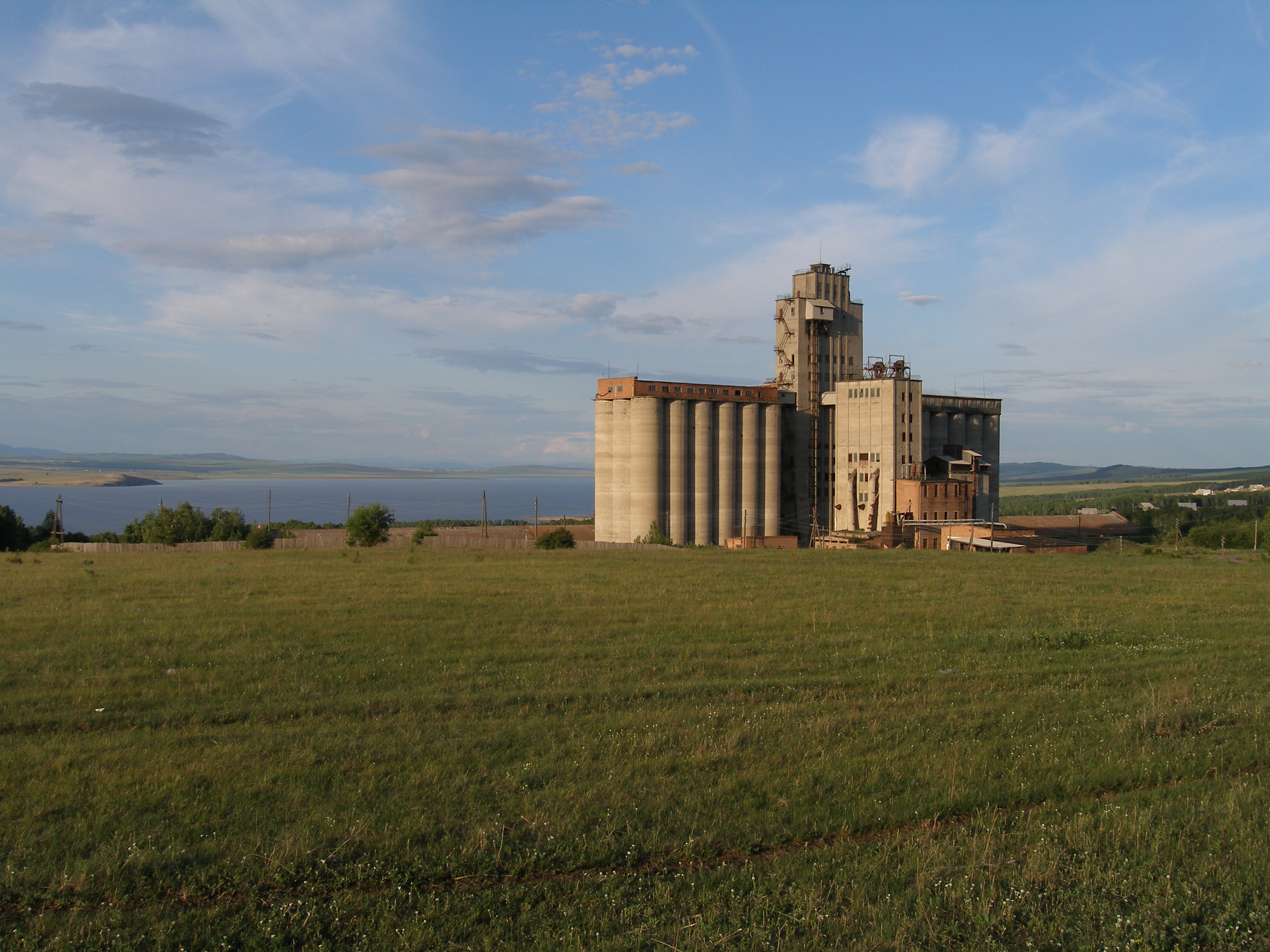
- Interactive map of Krasnoturansk
- Location of Krasnoturansk Krasnoturansk (Krasnoyarsk Krai)
- Coordinates: 54°18′55″N 91°33′45″E
- Country: Russia
- Federal subject: Krasnoyarsk Krai
- Administrative district: Krasnoturansky District
- Selsoviet: Krasnoturansky Selsoviet
- Established: 1962

Population (2010 Census)
  - Total: 9,187
  - Estimate (2017): 5,478 (−40.4%)

Administrative status
  - Capital of: Krasnoturansky District, Krasnoturansky Selsoviet

Municipal status
  - Municipal district: Krasnoturansky Municipal District
  - Rural settlement: Krasnoturansky Rural Settlement
  - Capital of: Krasnoturansky Municipal District, Krasnoturansky Rural Settlement
- Time zone: UTC+7 (MSK+4)
- Postal code: 662660
- Dialing code: +7 39134
- OKTMO ID: 04628413101

Krasnoturansk (Russian: Краснотура́нск) is a rural locality (a selo) and the administrative center of Krasnoturansky District, Krasnoyarsk Krai, Russia. Population: 5,790 (2010 census); 5,937 (2002 census); 6,882 (1989 Soviet census).
