= Idrinskoye =

Rural locality in Krasnoyarsk Krai, Russia

Coordinates: 54°22′26″N 92°08′20″E

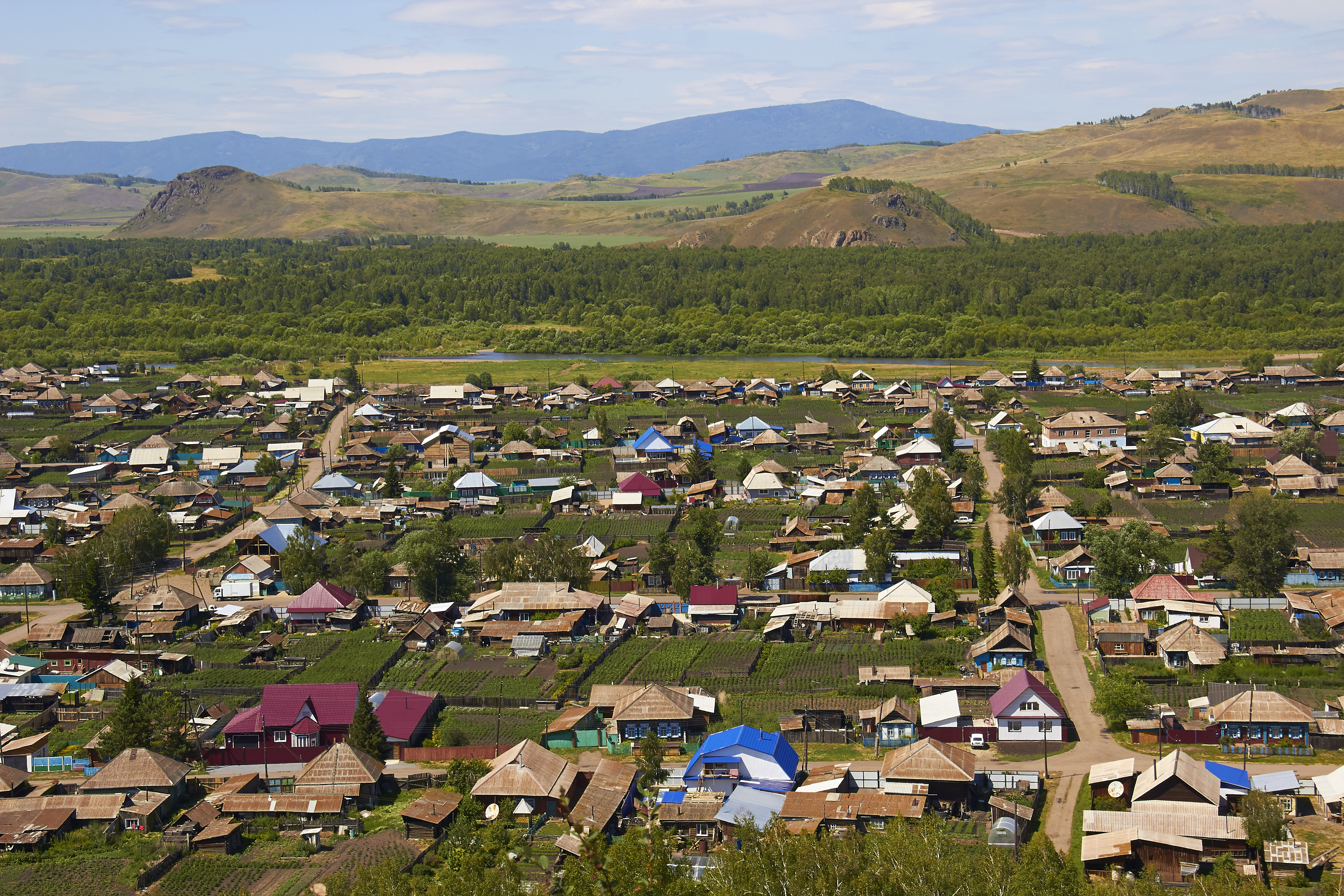
Idrinskoye

Flag of Irdinskoye

Idrinskoye (Russian: И́дринское) is a rural locality (a selo) and the administrative center of Idrinsky District, Krasnoyarsk Krai, Russia. Population: 5,135 (2010 census); 5,585 (2002 census); 6,513 (1989 Soviet census).
