= Abalakovo, Yeniseysky District, Krasnoyarsk Krai =

Abalakovo Абалаково
- Selo
- Location within Krasnoyarsk Krai Location within Russia
- Coordinates: 58°06′N 92°42′E
- Country: Russia
- Region: Krasnoyarsk Krai
- District: Yeniseysky District
- Time zone: [[UTC+7:00]]

Abalakovo (Russian: Абала́ково) is a rural locality (a selo) and the administrative center of Abalakovsky Selsoviet of Yeniseysky District, Krasnoyarsk Krai, Russia. The population was 1451 as of 2010. There are 25 streets.

== Geography ==
Abalakovo is located 62 km southeast of Yeniseysk (the district's administrative centre) by road. Ust-Tunguska is the nearest rural locality.
