= Irbeysky District =

Irbeysky District Ирбейский район (Russian)
- District
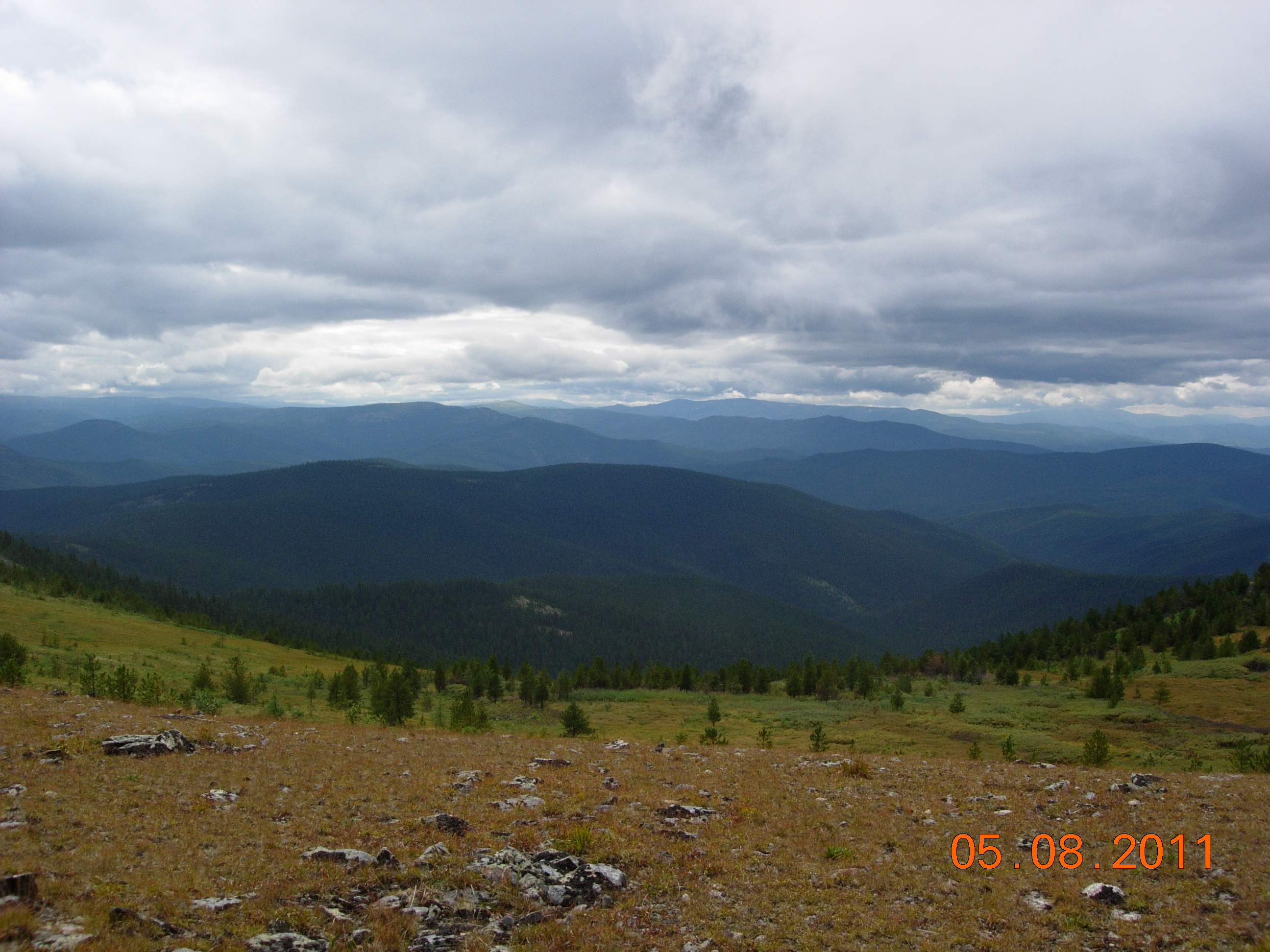
- Mountain landscape, Irbeysky District

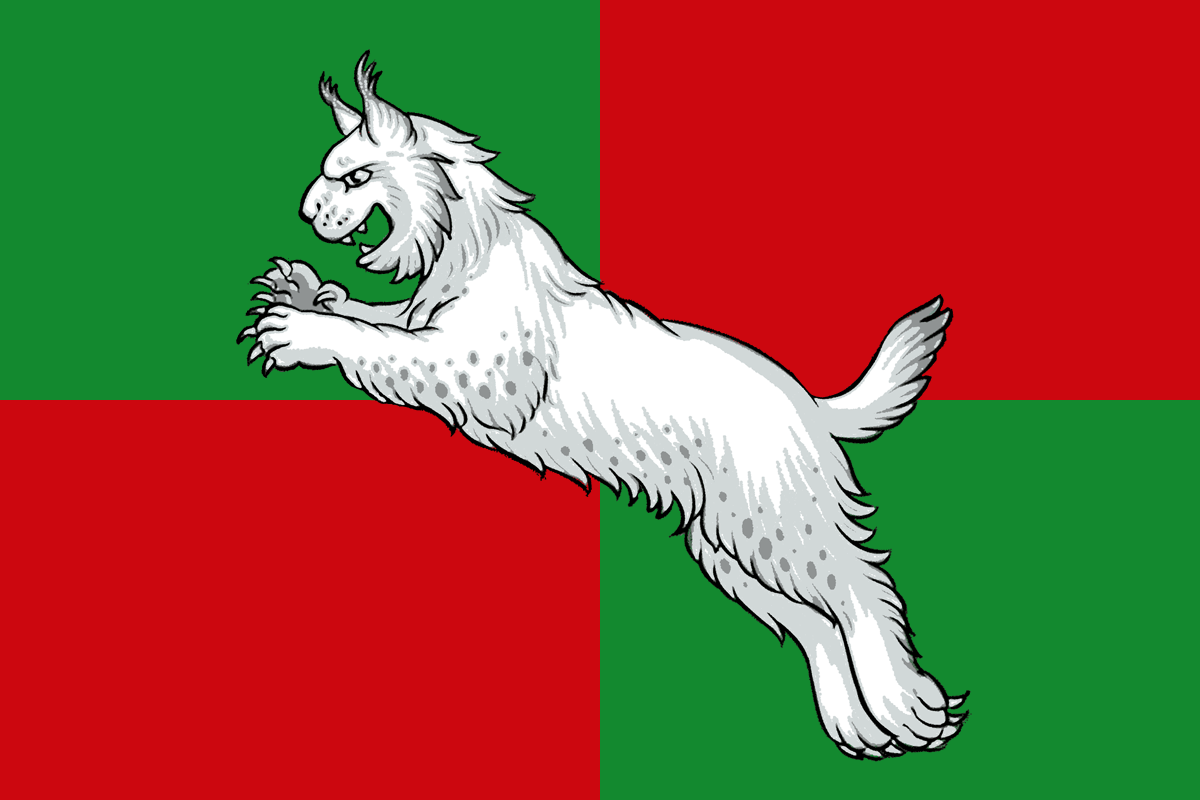
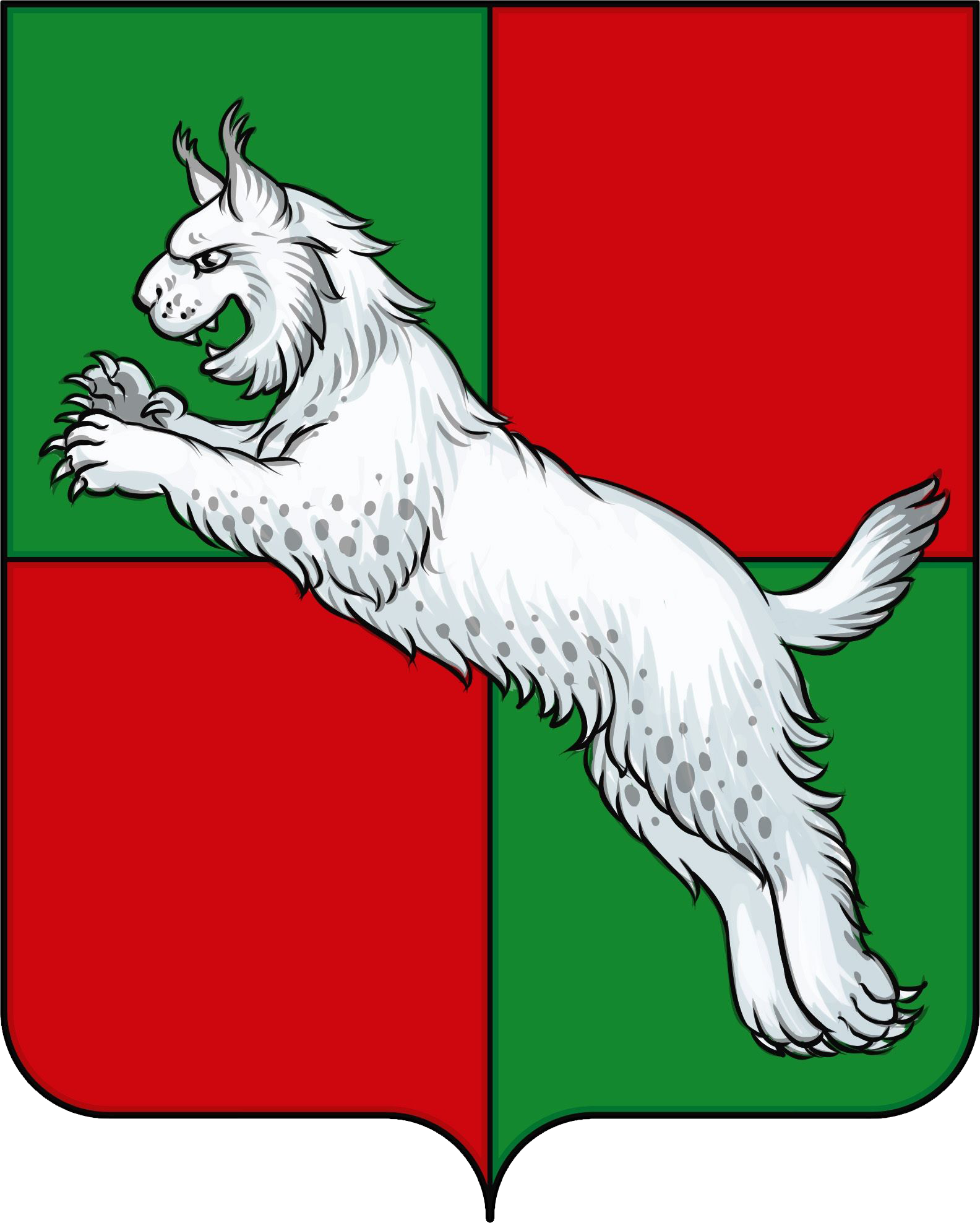
- Flag Coat of arms
- Location of Irbeysky District in Krasnoyarsk Krai
- Coordinates: 55°38′49″N 95°26′46″E
- Country: Russia
- Federal subject: Krasnoyarsk Krai
- Established: April 4, 1924
- Administrative center: Irbeyskoye

Government
  - Type: Local government
  - Body: Irbeysky District Council of Deputies
  - Head: Dmitry Kh. Gushanu

Area
  - Total: 10,921 km^{2} (4,217 sq mi)

Population (2010 Census)
  - Total: 16,784
  - Density: 1.5369/km^{2} (3.9804/sq mi)
  - Urban: 0%
  - Rural: 100%

Administrative structure
  - Administrative divisions: 18 selsoviet
  - Inhabited localities: 49 rural localities

Municipal structure
  - Municipally incorporated as: Irbeysky Municipal District
  - Municipal divisions: 0 urban settlements, 18 rural settlements
- Time zone: UTC+7 (MSK+4)
- OKTMO ID: 04619000
- Website: http://xn--90aiajhg2alm.xn--p1ai/index.php?id=24

Irbeysky District (Russian: Ирбе́йский райо́н) is an administrative and municipal district (raion), one of the forty-three in Krasnoyarsk Krai, Russia. It is located in the southwest of the krai and borders with Kansky and Ilansky Districts in the north, Irkutsk Oblast in the east and south, Rybinsky District in the southwest, and with Sayansky District in the west. The area of the district is 10,921 square kilometers (4,217 sq mi). Its administrative center is the rural locality (a selo) of Irbeyskoye. Population: 16,784 (2010 census); 19,181 (2002 Census); 21,572 (1989 Soviet census). The population of Irbeyskoye accounts for 27.9% of the district's total population.

== History ==
The district was founded on April 4, 1924.
