= Rybinsky District =

Location of Krasnoyarsk Krai in Russia

Location of Yaroslavl Oblast in Russia

Rybinsky District is the name of several administrative and municipal districts in Russia:

- Rybinsky District, Krasnoyarsk Krai, an administrative and municipal district of Krasnoyarsk Krai
- Rybinsky District, Yaroslavl Oblast, an administrative and municipal district of Yaroslavl Oblast
