= Irbeyskoye =

Rural locality in Krasnoyarsk Krai, Russia

Coordinates: 55°39′07″N 95°28′22″E

Irbeyskoye (Russian: Ирбе́йское) is a rural locality (a selo) and the administrative center of Irbeysky District, Krasnoyarsk Krai, Russia. Population: 4,687 (2010 census); 4,755 (2002 census); 5,109 (1989 Soviet census).
