= Novosyolovsky District =

Novosyolovsky District Новосёловский район (Russian)
- District
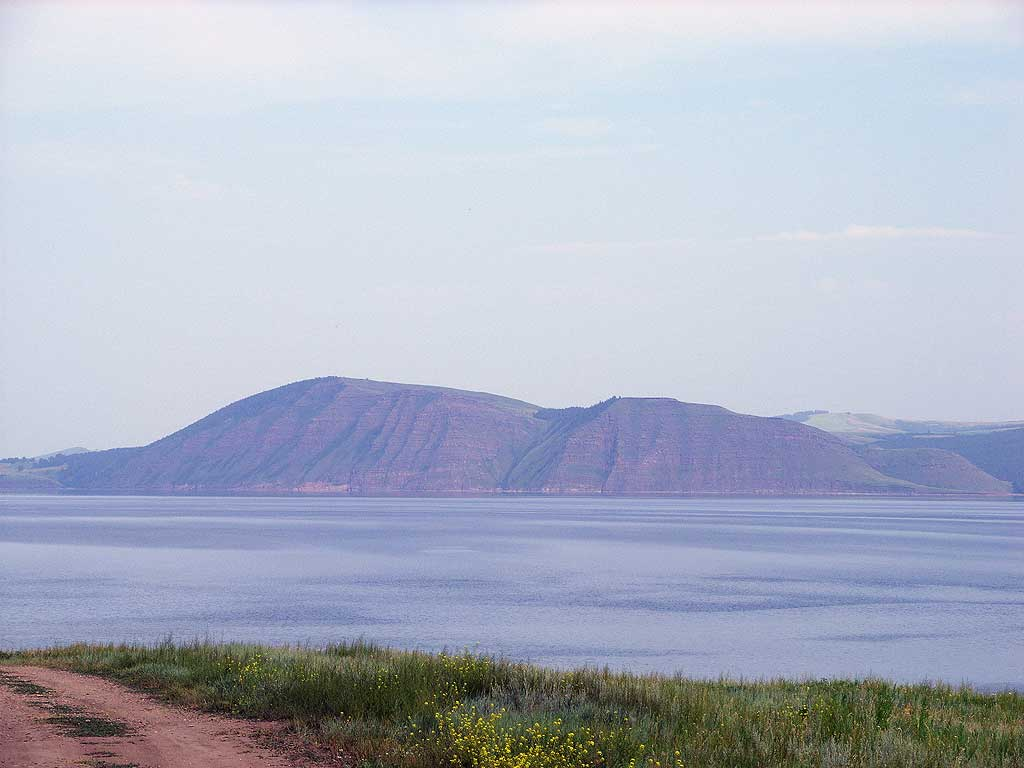
- Krasnoyarsk Reservoir near the selo of Novosyolovo in Novosyolovsky District

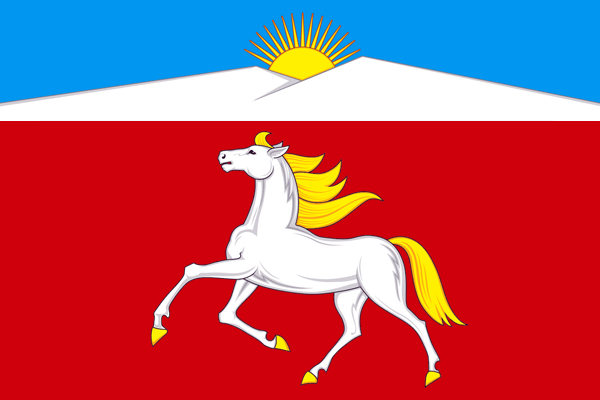
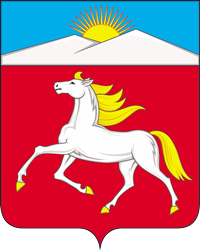
- Flag Coat of arms
- Location of Novosyolovsky District in Krasnoyarsk Krai
- Coordinates: 55°00′N 90°53′E
- Country: Russia
- Federal subject: Krasnoyarsk Krai
- Established: April 4, 1924
- Administrative center: Novosyolovo

Government
  - Type: Local government
  - Body: Novosyolovsky District Council of Deputies
  - Head: Andrey V. Volodin

Area
  - Total: 3,881 km^{2} (1,498 sq mi)

Population (2010 Census)
  - Total: 14,135
  - Density: 3.642/km^{2} (9.433/sq mi)
  - Urban: 0%
  - Rural: 100%

Administrative structure
  - Administrative divisions: 8 selsoviet
  - Inhabited localities: 30 rural localities

Municipal structure
  - Municipally incorporated as: Novosyolovsky Municipal District
  - Municipal divisions: 0 urban settlements, 8 rural settlements
- Time zone: UTC+7 (MSK+4)
- OKTMO ID: 04641000
- Website: http://nov-krs.ru

Novosyolovsky District (Russian: Новосёловский райо́н) is an administrative and municipal district (raion), one of the forty-three in Krasnoyarsk Krai, Russia. It is located in the southwest of the krai and borders with Balakhtinsky District in the north and east, Krasnoturansky District in the southeast, the Republic of Khakassia in the southwest and west, and with Uzhursky District in the northwest. The area of the district is 3,881 square kilometers (1,498 sq mi). Its administrative center is the rural locality (a selo) of Novosyolovo. Population: 14,135 (2010 census); 16,382 (2002 Census); 17,358 (1989 Soviet census). The population of Novosyolovo accounts for 42.3% of the district's total population.

== Geography ==
The Yenisey River flows through the district.

== History ==
The district was founded on April 4, 1924.

In 1911, General Secretary of the Communist Party of the Soviet Union Konstantin Chernenko was born in the village of Bolshaya Tes, which is currently located in the district.

== Divisions and government ==
As of 2013, the Head of the district and the Chairman of the District Council is Andrey V. Volodin.
