= Idrinsky District =

Idrinsky District Идринский район (Russian)
- District
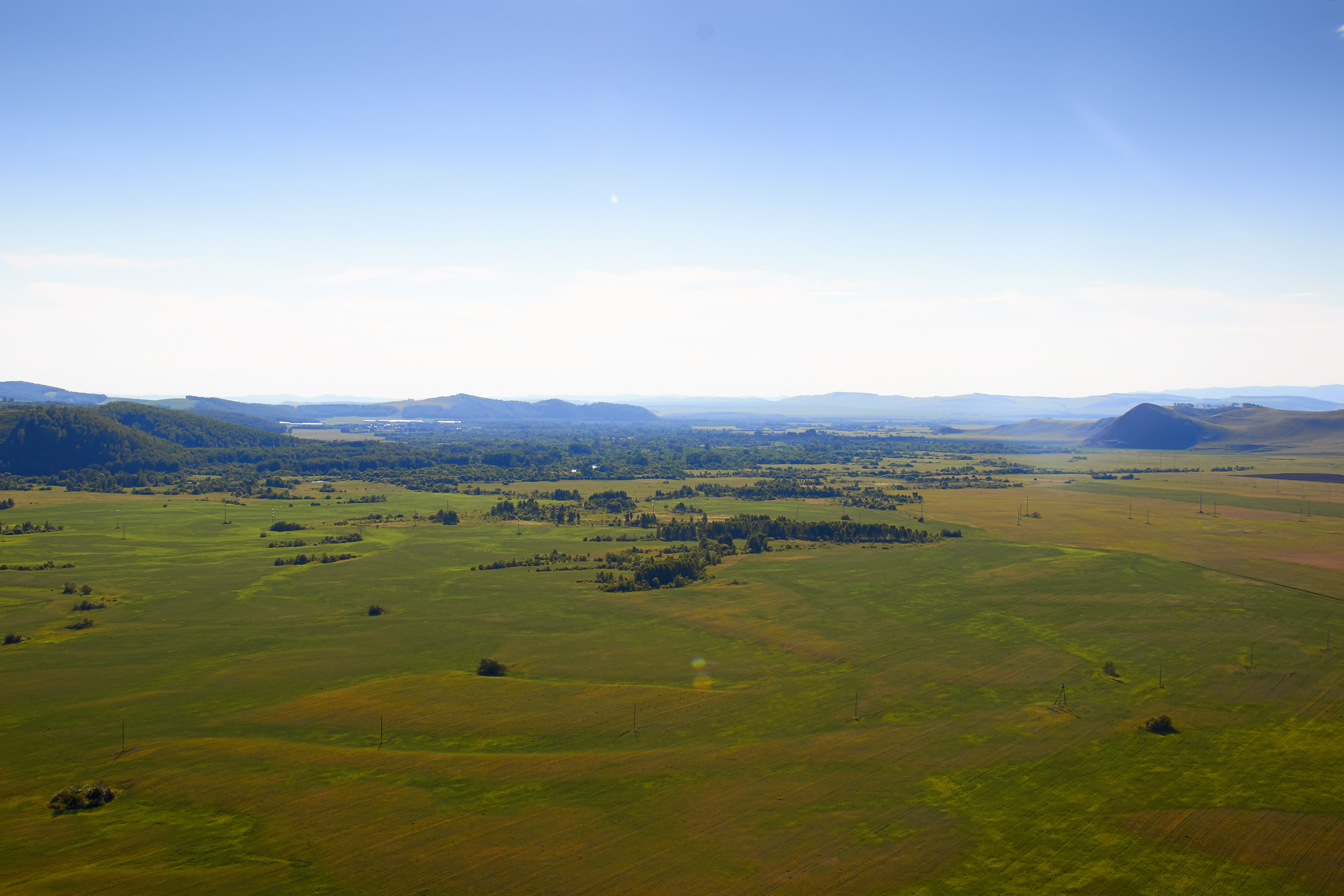
- Landscape in Idrinsky District

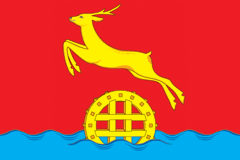
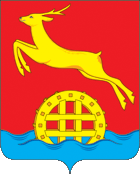
- Flag Coat of arms
- Location of Idrinsky District in Krasnoyarsk Krai
- Coordinates: 54°22′37″N 92°07′48″E
- Country: Russia
- Federal subject: Krasnoyarsk Krai
- Established: April 4, 1924
- Administrative center: Idrinskoye

Government
  - Type: Local government
  - Body: Idrinsky District Council of Deputies
  - Head: Anatoly G. Bukatov

Area
  - Total: 6,115 km^{2} (2,361 sq mi)

Population (2010 Census)
  - Total: 12,472
  - Density: 2.040/km^{2} (5.282/sq mi)
  - Urban: 0%
  - Rural: 100%

Administrative structure
  - Administrative divisions: 16 selsoviet
  - Inhabited localities: 37 rural localities

Municipal structure
  - Municipally incorporated as: Idrinsky Municipal District
  - Municipal divisions: 0 urban settlements, 16 rural settlements
- Time zone: UTC+7 (MSK+4)
- OKTMO ID: 04617000
- Website: http://www.idra.org.ru/

Idrinsky District (Russian: И́дринский райо́н) is an administrative and municipal district (raion), one of the forty-three in Krasnoyarsk Krai, Russia. It is located in the southwest of the krai and borders with Balakhtinsky District in the north, Kuraginsky District in the east and south, and with Krasnoturansky District in the west. The area of the district is 6,115 square kilometers (2,361 sq mi). Its administrative center is the rural locality (a selo) of Idrinskoye. Population: 12,472 (2010 census); 15,399 (2002 Census); 17,780 (1989 Soviet census). The population of Idrinskoye accounts for 41.2% of the district's total population.

== History ==
The district was founded on April 4, 1924.

== Government ==
The Head of the District and the Chairman of the District Council is Anatoly G. Bukatov.
