= Divnogorsk constituency =

Legislative constituency in Russia

Divnogorsk single-member constituency
- Constituency of the Russian State Duma

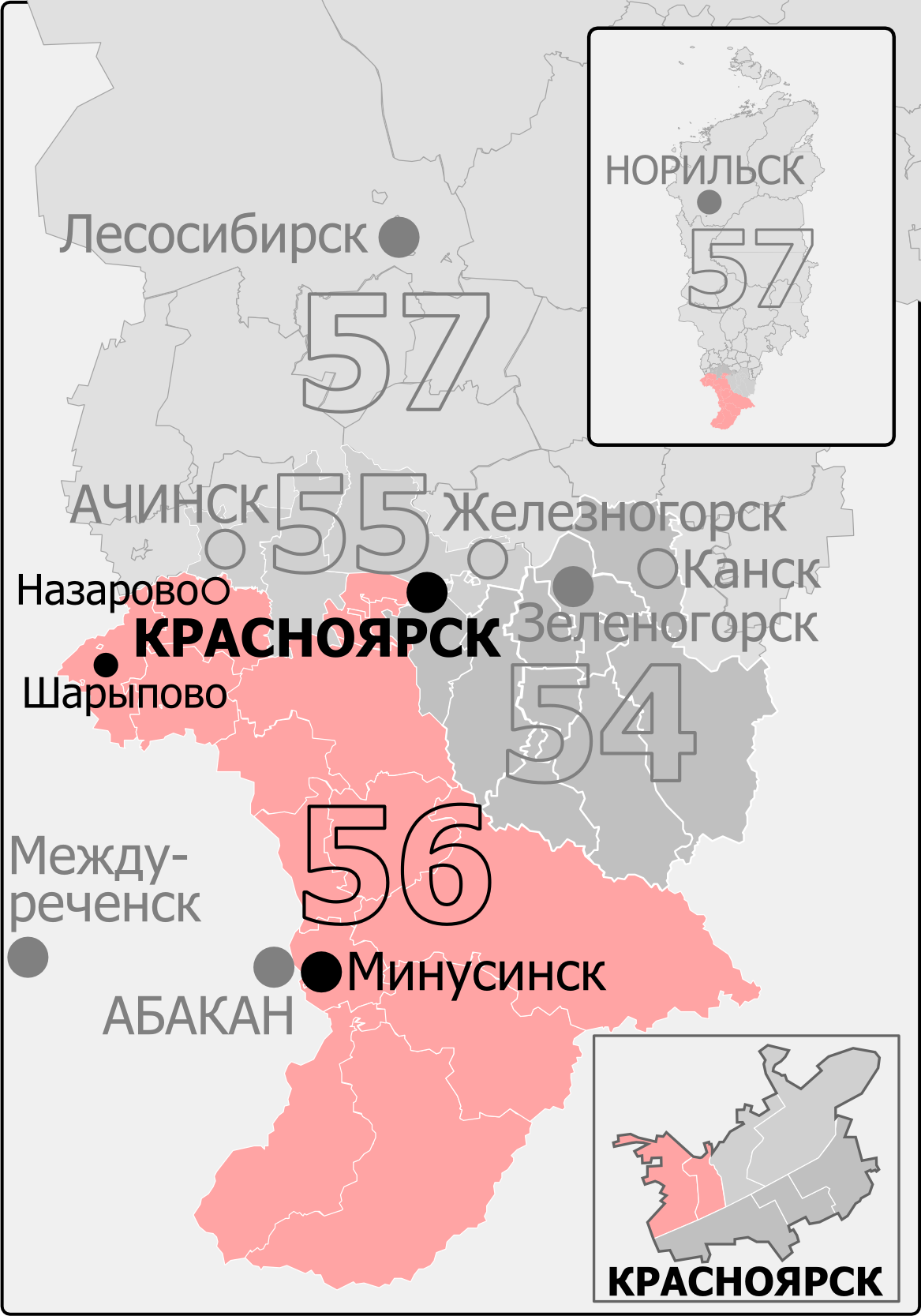
- Constituency boundaries since 2016
- Deputy: Sergey Yeryomin; United Russia
- Federal subject: Krasnoyarsk Krai
- Districts: Balakhtinsky, Divnogorsk, Idrinsky, Karatuzsky, Krasnoturansky, Krasnoyarsk (Oktyabrsky, Zheleznodorozhny), Kuraginsky, Minusinsk, Minusinsky, Nazarovo, Nazarovsky, Novosyolovsky, Sharypovo, Sharypovsky, Shushensky, ZATO Solnechny, Uzhursky, Yemelyanovsky (Mininsky, Zeledeyevsky), Yermakovsky
- Voters: 524,485 (2026)

The Divnogorsk constituency (No.60 (Note: Achinsk constituency No.46 in 1993-1995, Achinsk constituency No.45 in 1995-2003, Achinsk constituency No.47 in 2003-2007, No.56 in 2016–2026)) is a Russian legislative constituency in Krasnoyarsk Krai. The constituency covers southern Krasnoyarsk Krai.

The constituency has been represented since 2023 by United Russia deputy Sergey Yeryomin, former Mayor of Krasnoyarsk, who succeeded four-term United Russia deputy Viktor Zubarev after his death in May 2023.

== Boundaries ==
1993–1995 Achinsk constituency: Achinsk, Achinsky District, Balakhtinsky District, Birilyussky District, Bogotol, Bogotolsky District, Bolshemurtinsky District, Bolsheuluysky District, Idrinsky District, Karatuzsky District, Kozulsky District, Krasnoturansky District, Kuraginsky District, Minusinsk, Minusinsky District, Nazarovo, Nazarovsky District, Novosyolovsky District, Sharypovo, Sharypovsky District, Shushensky District, Sukhobuzimsky District, Tyukhtetsky District, Uzhursky District, Yermakovsky District
The constituency covered southern and western Krasnoyarsk Krai, including the industrial towns of Achinsk, Bogotol, Nazarovo and Sharypovo.

1995–2007 Achinsk constituency: Achinsk, Achinsky District, Balakhtinsky District, Birilyussky District, Bogotol, Bogotolsky District, Bolsheuluysky District, Idrinsky District, Karatuzsky District, Kozulsky District, Krasnoturansky District, Kuraginsky District, Minusinsk, Minusinsky District, Nazarovo, Nazarovsky District, Novosyolovsky District, Sharypovo, Sharypovsky District, Shushensky District, Solnechny, Tyukhtetsky District, Uzhursky District, Yermakovsky District
After the 1995 redistricting the constituency was slightly changed, losing Bolshemurtinsky and Sukhobuzimsky to Krasnoyarsk constituency.

2016–present: Balakhtinsky District, Divnogorsk, Idrinsky District, Karatuzsky District, Krasnoturansky District, Krasnoyarsk (Oktyabrsky, Zheleznodorozhny), Kuraginsky District, Minusinsk, Minusinsky District, Nazarovo, Nazarovsky District, Novosyolovsky District, Sharypovo, Sharypovsky District, Shushensky District, Solnechny, Uzhursky, Yemelyanovsky District (Mininsky, Zeledeyevsky), Yermakovsky District
The constituency was re-created for the 2016 election, it retained southern Krasnoyarsk Krai and most of its western portion, losing its northern part to Yeniseysk constituency and Achinsk to Central constituency. This seat gained areas to the south of Krasnoyarsk, including Divnogorsk, from Krasnoyarsk constituency.

== Members elected ==
Election	Member	Party
1993	Vasily Zhurko	Liberal Democratic Party
1995	Valery Sergiyenko	Congress of Russian Communities
1999	Sergey Generalov	Independent
2003	Aleksandr Klyukin	United Russia
2007	Proportional representation - no election by constituency	
2011	Proportional representation - no election by constituency	
2016	Viktor Zubarev (Note: died in May 2023)	United Russia
2021	Viktor Zubarev	United Russia
2023	Sergey Yeryomin	United Russia
2026	Sergey Yeryomin	United Russia

== Election results ==
=== 1993 ===
==== Declared candidates ====
- Gennady Mantsvetov (Independent), construction executive
- Anna Shushakova (PRES), Deputy Head of Uzhursky District (1993–present)
- Vasily Zhurko (LDPR), former Member of Ust-Kulsk Rural Council of People's Deputies (1985–1986), bus driver

==== Results ====
Summary of the 12 December 1993 Russian legislative election in the Achinsk constituency
Candidate	Party	Votes	%
Vasily Zhurko	Liberal Democratic Party	102,795	32.09%
Anna Shushakova	Party of Russian Unity and Accord	70,836	22.10%
Gennady Mantsvetov	Independent	63,621	19.86%
against all		58,191	18.16%
Total		320,369	100%

=== 1995 ===
==== Declared candidates ====
- Valery Kolmakov (Independent), Member of State Duma (1994–present)
- Valery Sergiyenko (KRO), former First Deputy Governor of Krasnoyarsk Krai (1992–1993), former People's Deputy of the Soviet Union (1989–1991), 1993 gubernatorial candidate
- Lilia Skolkova (Independent), entrepreneur
- Vasily Zhurko (LDPR), incumbent Member of State Duma (1994–present)

==== Results ====
Summary of the 17 December 1995 Russian legislative election in the Achinsk constituency
Candidate	Party	Votes	%
Valery Sergiyenko	Congress of Russian Communities	119,937	32.56%
Valery Kolmakov	Independent	94,818	25.74%
Vasily Zhurko (incumbent)	Liberal Democratic Party	49,480	13.43%
Lilia Skolkova	Independent	43,933	11.93%
against all		52,973	14.38%
Total		368,317	100%

=== 1999 ===
==== Declared candidates ====
- Valery Barmin (Independent), Achinsk Oil Refinery deputy director
- Sergey Generalov (Independent), former Minister of Fuel and Energy of Russia (1998–1999)
- Anatoly Nazeykin (Nikolayev–Fyodorov Bloc), chairman of the All-Russian Union of Communications Workers (1988–present)
- Oleg Pashchenko (Independent), Member of Legislative Assembly of Krasnoyarsk Krai (1997–present), journalist
- Valery Sergiyenko (Independent), incumbent Member of State Duma (1996–present), 1993 and 1998 gubernatorial candidate
- Vasily Zhurko (Independent), Member of State Duma (1994–present)

==== Failed to qualify ====
- Gennady Komarov (Independent), state liquor trade executive
- Yevgeny Semchenko (Independent)
- Viktor Suslov (Independent), nonprofit president
- Sergey Tikhonov (DN), coordinator of the Eastern party group

==== Did not file ====
- Anatoly Bykov (Independent), Member of Legislative Assembly of Krasnoyarsk Krai (1997–present), Krasnoyarsk Aluminium Plant board of directors chairman

==== Results ====
Summary of the 19 December 1999 Russian legislative election in the Achinsk constituency
Candidate	Party	Votes	%
Sergey Generalov	Independent	74,776	23.12%
Oleg Pashchenko	Independent	59,031	18.25%
Valery Sergiyenko (incumbent)	Independent	54,069	16.72%
Valery Barmin	Independent	37,379	11.56%
Anatoly Nazeykin	Andrey Nikolayev and Svyatoslav Fyodorov Bloc	10,533	3.26%
Vasily Zhurko	Independent	6,604	2.04%
against all		74,539	23.05%
Total		323,408	100%

=== 2003 ===
Results by district: Aleksandr Klyukin: 20–30% 30–40% 40–50%; Yevgeny Vasilyev: 20–30% 30–40%; Against all: 30–40% 40–50%

==== Declared candidates ====
- Vladimir Dmitriyevsky (LDPR), Member of Kozulsky District Council of Deputies
- Aleksandr Klyukin (United Russia), Member of State Duma (2000–present)
- Valery Kolmakov (Independent), former First Deputy Head of the Federal Tax Police Service Main Department of Security and Anti-Corruption (1996–2001), former Member of State Duma (1994–1995)
- Oleg Pashchenko (APR), Member of Legislative Assembly of Krasnoyarsk Krai (1997–present), 1999 candidate for this seat
- Anatoly Sidorov (VR–ES), Irkutskenergo executive
- Yevgeny Vasilyev (Independent), former Chief Federal Inspector for Taymyr Autonomous Okrug and Evenk Autonomous Okrug (2000–2001), former Deputy Governor of Krasnoyarsk Krai (1992–1997, 1999–2000)

==== Withdrawn candidates ====
- Anatoly Bykov (Independent), former Member of Legislative Assembly of Krasnoyarsk Krai (1997–2001, 2002–2003), convicted felon, 1999 candidate for this seat (disqualified on November 30, 2003)

==== Did not file ====
- Mikhail Chernyakov (Independent), pensioner
- Oleg Gonchar (Independent), cossack commander

==== Declined ====
- Sergey Generalov (SPS), incumbent Member of State Duma (2000–present)

==== Results ====
Summary of the 7 December 2003 Russian legislative election in the Achinsk constituency
Candidate	Party	Votes	%
Aleksandr Klyukin	United Russia	80,157	30.12%
Yevgeny Vasilyev	Independent	61,843	23.24%
Oleg Pashchenko	Agrarian Party	26,531	9.97%
Vladimir Dmitriyevsky	Liberal Democratic Party	15,931	5.99%
Valery Kolmakov	Independent	5,465	2.05%
Anatoly Sidorov	Great Russia – Eurasian Union	3,985	1.50%
against all		60,521	22.74%
Total		266,251	100%

=== 2016 ===
==== Declared candidates ====
- Irina Ivanova (CPCR), former Member of Krasnoyarsk City Council of Deputies (2008–2013), television executive
- Dmitry Nosov (CPRF), Member of State Duma (2011–present)
- Yaroslav Pitersky (Yabloko), journalist
- Gennady Semigin (Patriots of Russia), former Member of State Duma (2000–2007), chairman of the Patriots of Russia party (2005–present)
- Roman Ulskikh (LDPR), Member of Divnogorsk City Council of Deputies (2015–present), lawyer
- Valentina Ulyanova (GP), secretary of the Khabarovsk Krai party regional office
- Sergey Yerbyagin (The Greens), former aide to Supreme Council of the Republic of Khakassia chairman Vladimir Shtygashev (2011–2013), 2004 Khakassia head candidate
- Maksim Zolotukhin (A Just Russia), Member of Krasnoyarsk City Council of Deputies (2013–present), businessman
- Viktor Zubarev (United Russia), Deputy Premier of Krasnoyarsk Krai – Minister of Economic Development, Investment Policy, and External Relations (2014–present), former Member of State Duma (2007–2011, 2012–2014)

==== Withdrawn candidates ====
- Irina Romashechkina (Rodina), nonprofit president (withdrew on September 9, 2016)

==== Declined ====
- Mikhail Yashin (United Russia), Member of State Duma (2014–present) (lost the primary, ran on the party list)
- Vladislav Zyryanov (United Russia), Member of Legislative Assembly of Krasnoyarsk Krai (2007–present) (lost the primary)

==== Results ====
Summary of the 18 September 2016 Russian legislative election in the Divnogorsk constituency
Candidate	Party	Votes	%
Viktor Zubarev	United Russia	90,661	40.95%
Dmitry Nosov	Communist Party	38,318	17.31%
Roman Ulskikh	Liberal Democratic Party	21,818	9.85%
Gennady Semigin	Patriots of Russia	19,281	8.71%
Irina Ivanova	Communists of Russia	13,608	6.15%
Maksim Zolotukhin	A Just Russia	10,776	4.87%
Yaroslav Pitersky	Yabloko	5,741	2.59%
Sergey Yerbyagin	The Greens	4,945	2.23%
Valentina Ulyanova	Civic Platform	3,517	1.59%
Total		221,412	100%

=== 2021 ===
==== Declared candidates ====
- Leonid Fedotenko (RPPSS), former Head of Mansky District (2010), former Member of Legislative Assembly of Krasnoyarsk Krai (1997–2007)
- Vladimir Katsaurov (New People), fire safety consultant
- Yaroslav Khavron (LDPR), Member of Supreme Council of the Republic of Khakassia (2018–present), businessman
- Sergey Kornyushkin (SR–ZP), Member of Lesosibirsk City Council of Deputies (2020–present), construction executive
- Oleg Lyutykh (CPCR), history associate professor
- Boris Melnichenko (CPRF), former Member of Legislative Assembly of Krasnoyarsk Krai (2007–2016), agribusinessman, former co-chairman of the Party of Rural Revival (2012–2019)
- Viktor Zubarev (United Russia), incumbent Member of State Duma (2007–2011, 2012–2014, 2016–present))

==== Failed to qualify ====
- Tatyana Davydenko (Independent), Member of Sharypovo City Council of Deputies (2020–present), former Chairwoman of the Accounts Chamber of Krasnoyarsk Krai (2011–2019)
- Tatyana Gornostayeva (Independent), former farmer
- Aleksey Melnichenko (Independent), entrepreneur

==== Results ====
Summary of the 17-19 September 2021 Russian legislative election in the Divnogorsk constituency
Candidate	Party	Votes	%
Viktor Zubarev (incumbent)	United Russia	79,451	34.38%
Boris Melnichenko	Communist Party	65,677	28.42%
Vladimir Katsaurov	New People	18,066	7.82%
Oleg Lyutykh	Communists of Russia	17,978	7.78%
Yaroslav Khavron	Liberal Democratic Party	16,126	6.98%
Sergey Kornyushkin	A Just Russia — For Truth	12,640	5.47%
Leonid Fedotenko	Party of Pensioners	9,637	4.17%
Total		231,105	100%

=== 2023 ===
==== Declared candidates ====
- Grigory Gavrilov (LDPR), Member of Divnogorsk City Council of Deputies (2023–present), aide to State Duma member Sergey Karginov
- Ksenia Kadakina (SR–ZP), personnel manager
- Andrey Kucheryavy (Yabloko), retired police colonel
- Dmitry Semirenko (CPRF), Deputy Chairman of Shushensky District Council of Deputies (2020–present), businessman, veteran of the Russian invasion of Ukraine
- Ivan Serebryakov (Rodina), former Member of Legislative Assembly of Krasnoyarsk Krai (2016–2021), 2014, 2018 and 2023 gubernatorial candidate
- Sergey Yeryomin (United Russia), Deputy Governor of Krasnoyarsk Krai (2022–present), former Mayor of Krasnoyarsk (2017–2022)

==== Declined ====
- Maksim Markert (SR–ZP), Member of Legislative Assembly of Krasnoyarsk Krai (2011–2016, 2018–present) (running for Governor)
- Boris Melnichenko (CPRF), Member of Legislative Assembly of Krasnoyarsk Krai (2007–2016, 2021–present), agribusinessman, 2021 candidate for this seat

==== Results ====
Summary of the 8–10 September 2023 by-election in the Divnogorsk constituency
Candidate	Party	Votes	%
Sergey Yeryomin	United Russia	111,032	57.54%
Dmitry Semirenko	Communist Party	20,352	10.55%
Grigory Gavrilov	Liberal Democratic Party	19,732	10.23%
Ivan Serebryakov	Rodina	14,849	7.70%
Ksenia Kadakina	A Just Russia – For Truth	12,159	6.30%
Andrey Kucheryavy	Yabloko	5,665	2.94%
Total		192,967	100%

=== 2026 ===
==== Declared candidates ====
- Denis Brazauskas (CPCR), former Member of Supreme Council of the Republic of Khakassia (2013–2023), perennial candidate
- Vyacheslav Dyukov (The Greens), former Member of Krasnoyarsk City Council of Deputies (2018–2025), nonprofit chairman
- Grigory Gavrilov (LDPR), Member of Divnogorsk City Council of Deputies (2023–present), economist, 2023 candidate for this seat
- Valery Isayev (CPRF), Member of Legislative Assembly of Krasnoyarsk Krai (2007–present), agribusinessman
- Ilona Kostetskaya (New People), nutritionist
- Maksim Markert (A Just Russia), Member of Legislative Assembly of Krasnoyarsk Krai (2011–2016, 2018–present), 2023 gubernatorial candidate
- Mikhail Orda (RPPSS), Member of Bolshemurtinsko-Sukhobuzimsky District Council of Deputies (2025–present), construction businessman
- Dmitry Popov (PPD), individual entrepreneur
- Sergey Yeryomin (United Russia), incumbent Member of State Duma (2023–present)

==== Results ====
Summary of the 18-20 September 2026 Russian legislative election in the Divnogorsk constituency
Candidate	Party	Votes	%
Sergey Yeryomin (incumbent)	United Russia	113,426	41.72%
Valery Isayev	Communist Party	46,837	17.23%
Grigory Gavrilov	Liberal Democratic Party	27,378	10.07%
Ilona Kostetskaya	New People	22,267	8.19%
Denis Brazauskas	Communists of Russia	13,085	4.81%
Vyacheslav Dyukov	The Greens	12,412	4.56%
Maksim Markert	A Just Russia	9,074	3.34%
Mikhail Orda	Party of Pensioners	8,819	3.24%
Dmitry Popov	Party of Direct Democracy	6,069	2.23%
Total		271,902	100%
