= 2023 Krasnoyarsk Krai gubernatorial election =

- 8–10 September 2023
- Turnout: 35.49%
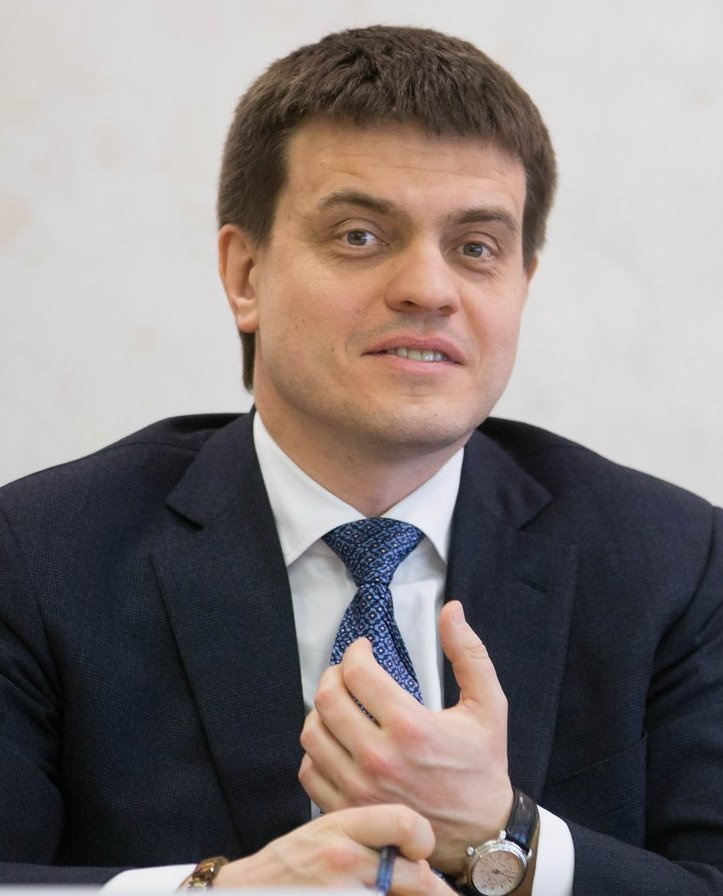
| | | LDPR |
| Candidate | Mikhail Kotyukov | Aleksandr Gliskov |
| Party | United Russia | LDPR |
| Popular vote | 512,325 | 82,586 |
| Percentage | 70.21% | 11.32% |
| | Greens | CPRF |
| Candidate | Irina Ivanova | Andrey Novak |
| Party | The Greens | CPRF |
| Popular vote | 60,220 | 43,740 |
| Percentage | 8.25% | 5.99% |
Governor before election
Mikhail Kotyukov (acting)
Independent
Governor-elect
Mikhail Kotyukov
United Russia

The 2023 Krasnoyarsk Krai gubernatorial election took place on 8–10 September 2023, on common election day. Acting governor Mikhail Kotyukov was elected to a full term in office.

== Background ==
In September 2017 first-term Governor of Krasnoyarsk Krai Viktor Tolokonsky asked for his resignation, which was approved by President of Russia Vladimir Putin, and Aleksandr Uss was appointed acting Governor. Uss is a fixture in Krasnoyarsk Krai politics as he has held public offices in the region since 1993, most recently serving as Chairman of the Legislative Assembly of Krasnoyarsk Krai (since 1998). Uss also previously ran for governor in 2002, losing to Alexander Khloponin in a second round by 6 points. Aleksandr Uss won an election for a full term in September 2018 with 60.2% of the vote, facing just two opponents from LDPR and A Just Russia.

Despite being a longtime politician in the region, during his gubernatorial term Uss faced low approval ratings as he was viewed as an out-of-touch oligarch – Uss consistently ranked one of the wealthiest governors in Russia. In summer 2019 Siberia faced one the most devastating wildfires in history, meanwhile Aleksandr Uss said that fire fighting in remote forests is "useless and in some cases – even harmful", for which he received public criticism. Former Krasnoyarsk Krai Accounts Chamber chair Tatyana Davydenko even suggested that the lack of response to wildfires was caused by deliberate attempt to cover up mass illegal logging. In June 2020 Vladimir Putin criticised Uss's report about Norilsk oil spill for an absence of adequate response and potential solutions. In June 2022 a massive corruption scandal hit Krasnoyarsk as former Rosprirodnadzor deputy chairman Oleg Mitvol and Krasnoyarsk Krai transportation minister Konstantin Dimitrov were arrested for an embezzlement of more than 900 million rubles in the Krasnoyarsk Metro construction. Another scandal hit Uss personally: his son Artyom Uss was arrested in Italy at the request of the US Department of Justice on the charges of sanctions evasion and Venezuelan oil smuggling. Artyom Uss was able to escape from custody and return to Russia in April 2023.

Due to governor's low public ratings and numerous conflicts, Aleksandr Uss was named a potential candidate for replacement prior to the 2023 election. His age and lack of necessary education (the so-called "School of Governors" courses) also contributed to speculations about his potential resignation at the end of the first term. Nevertheless, Uss publicly announced his intention to run for a second term in November 2022. Among Uss's possible replacements were mentioned State Duma members Yury Shvytkin, Aleksandr Drozdov and Aleksey Veller, former Moscow Oblast vice governor Natalya Virtuozova, Norilsk Nickel vice president Andrey Grachev, Minister of Natural Resources and Environment of Russia Alexander Kozlov and Federal Antimonopoly Service deputy head Vitaly Korolyov. On 20 April 2023 Governor Uss announced his resignation, President Putin appointed Deputy Minister of Finance of Russia Mikhail Kotyukov, a Krasnoyarsk native who previously served as regional finance minister, acting Governor of Krasnoyarsk Krai.

== Candidates ==
In Krasnoyarsk Krai candidates for governor can be nominated only by registered political parties, self-nomination is not possible. However, candidates are not obliged to be members of the nominating party. Candidate for Governor of Krasnoyarsk Krai should be a Russian citizen and at least 30 years old. Candidates for governor should not have a foreign citizenship or residence permit. Each candidate in order to be registered is required to collect at least 5% of signatures of members and heads of municipalities. Also gubernatorial candidates present 3 candidacies to the Federation Council and election winner later appoints one of the presented candidates.

=== Registered ===
- Aleksandr Gliskov (LDPR), Member of Legislative Assembly of Krasnoyarsk Krai (2016–present)
- Irina Ivanova (The Greens), Member of Legislative Assembly of Krasnoyarsk Krai (2021–present)
- Mikhail Kotyukov (United Russia), acting Governor of Krasnoyarsk Krai (2023–present), former Minister of Science and Higher Education of Russia (2018–2020)
- Maksim Markert (SR–ZP), Member of Legislative Assembly of Krasnoyarsk Krai (2011–2016, 2018–present)
- Andrey Novak (CPRF), Deputy Chairman of the Legislative Assembly of Krasnoyarsk Krai (2021–present), Member of Legislative Assembly (2015–present)

=== Did not file ===
- Ivan Serebryakov (Rodina), former Member of Legislative Assembly of Krasnoyarsk Krai (2016–2021), 2014 and 2018 Patriots of Russia gubernatorial candidate
- Denis Terekhov (New People), Member of Legislative Assembly of Krasnoyarsk Krai (2021–present)

=== Eliminated at United Russia convention ===
- Edkham Akbulatov, rector of Siberian State Aerospace University, former mayor of Krasnoyarsk (2011–2017)
- Sergey Skripkin, chief doctor of Krasnoyarsk ambulance station
- Mikhail Speransky, Mayor of Zelenogorsk (2018–present)
- Aleksey Tumanin, head of Krasnoyarsk Railway

=== Declined ===
- Boris Melnichenko (CPRF), Member of Legislative Assembly of Krasnoyarsk Krai (2007–2016, 2021–present), agribusinessman
- Vasily Zhurko (LDPR), former Member of State Duma (1994–1999, 2007–2016), 2002 gubernatorial candidate

=== Candidates for Federation Council ===
- Mikhail Kotyukov (United Russia):
  - Marina Filippova, head of the Committee of Defenders' of the Fatherland Families regional office
  - Natalya Grushevskaya, Member of Civic Chamber of the Russian Federation (2023–present)
  - Andrey Klishas, incumbent Senator from Krasnoyarsk Krai (2012–present), Chairman of the Council Committee on Constitutional Legislation and State Building (2012–present)
- Andrey Novak (CPRF):
  - Aleksandr Boychenko, Member of Legislative Assembly of Krasnoyarsk Krai (2016–present)
  - Aleksandr Ratakhin, Member of Legislative Assembly of Krasnoyarsk Krai (2021–present)
  - Yelena Rodikova, aide to Legislative Assembly of Krasnoyarsk Krai member

== Finances ==
All sums are in rubles.

| Financial Report | Source | Gliskov | Ivanova | Kotyukov | Markert | Novak | Serebryakov | Terekhov |
|---|---|---|---|---|---|---|---|---|
| First | | 31,265 | 530,000 | 4,000,000 | 1,000,000 | 2,510,000 | 0 | 5,000,000 |
| Final | | 2,242,614 | 1,930,000 | 140,000,000 | 3,670,650 | 23,695,660 | 0 | 5,000,000 |

== Polls ==
| Fieldwork date | Polling firm | Kotyukov | Gliskov | Ivanova | Novak | Markert | None | Lead |
|---|---|---|---|---|---|---|---|---|
| 18–24 August 2023 | WCIOM | 71% | 12% | 8% | 6% | 2% | 1% | 60% |

== Results ==
Summary of the 8–10 September 2023 Krasnoyarsk Krai gubernatorial election results
| Candidate | Party | Votes | % |
|---|---|---|---|
| Mikhail Kotyukov (incumbent) | United Russia | 512,325 | 70.21 |
| Aleksandr Gliskov | Liberal Democratic Party | 82,586 | 11.32 |
| Irina Ivanova | The Greens | 60,220 | 8.25 |
| Andrey Novak | Communist Party | 43,740 | 5.99 |
| Maksim Markert | A Just Russia — For Truth | 12,369 | 1.70 |
| Valid votes | | 711,240 | 97.47 |
| Blank ballots | | 18,457 | 2.53 |
| Total | | 729,697 | 100.00 |
| Turnout | | 729,697 | 35.49 |
| Registered voters | | 2,055,777 | 100.00 |

Governor Kotyukov re-appointed incumbent senator Andrey Klishas to the Federation Council.

== See also ==
- 2023 Russian regional elections
