= Krasnoyarsk constituency =

Russian legislative constituency

Krasnoyarsk single-member constituency
- Constituency of the Russian State Duma

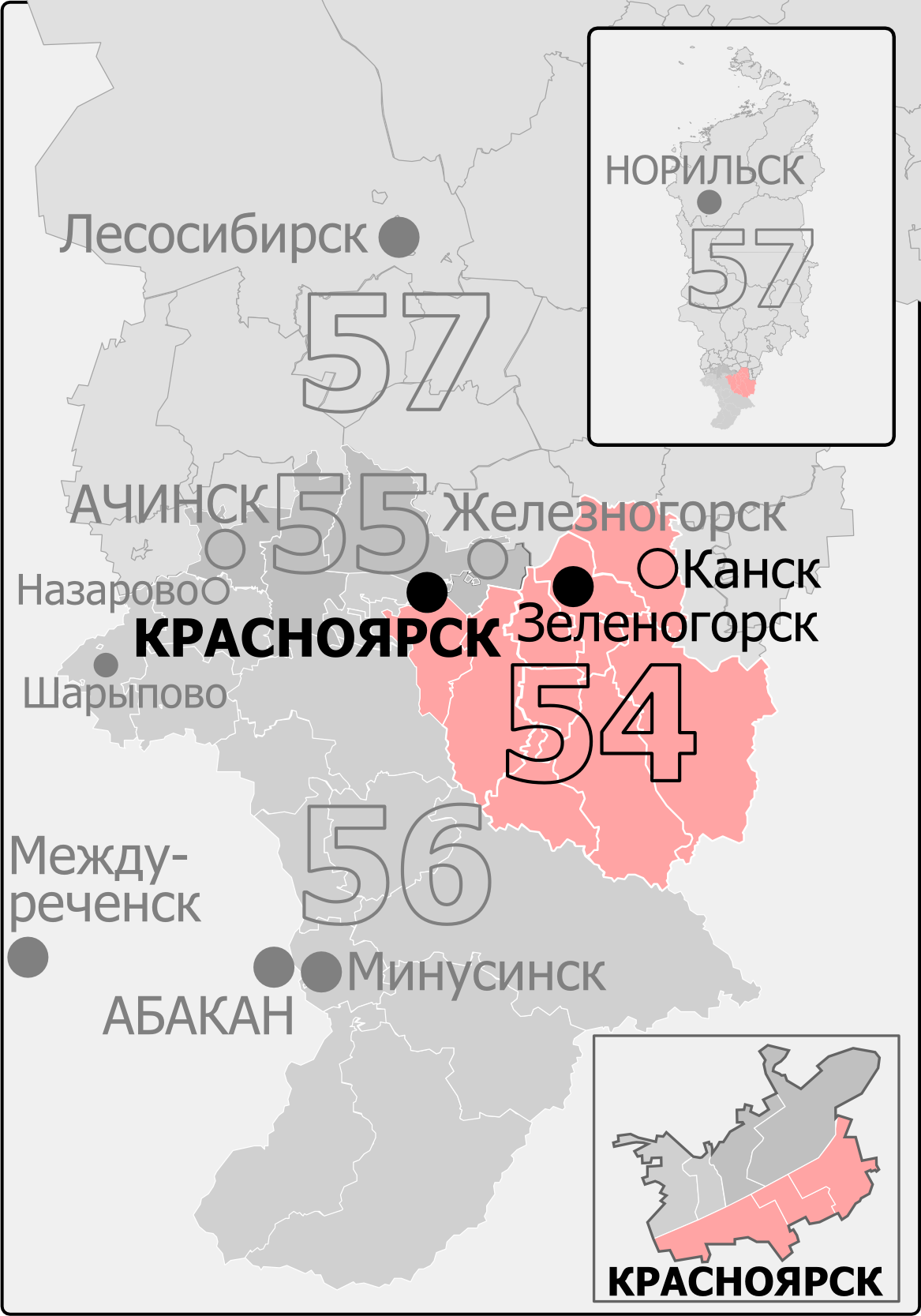
- Constituency boundaries since 2016
- Deputy: Oleg Likontsev; United Russia
- Federal subject: Krasnoyarsk Krai
- Districts: Beryozovsky (Magansky, Zykovsky), Borodino, Irbeysky, Kansk, Kansky, Krasnoyarsk (Kirovsky, Leninsky, Sverdlovsky), Mansky, Partizansky, Rybinsky, Sayansky, Uyarsky, ZATO Zelenogorsk
- Voters: 496,002 (2026)

The Krasnoyarsk constituency (No.58 (Note: No.49 in 1993-1995, No.48 in 1995-2003, No.50 in 2003-2007, No.54 in 2016–2026)) is a Russian legislative constituency in Krasnoyarsk Krai. The constituency covers southern half of Krasnoyarsk on the right bank of Yenisey as well as eastern Krasnoyarsk Krai.

The constituency has been represented since 2026 by United Russia deputy Oleg Likontsev, cossack ataman and Hero of Russia, who won the open seat left vacant following the death of two-term United Russia deputy Yury Shvytkin in March 2026.

== Boundaries ==
1993–1995: Beryozovsky District, Divnogorsk, Krasnoyarsk (Kirovsky, Leninsky, Sverdlovsky), Mansky District, Sosnovoborsk, Uyarsky District, Yemelyanovsky District
The constituency covered southern half of Krasnoyarsk on the right bank of Yenisey and areas in central Krasnoyarsk Krai surrounding the city.

1995–2007: Beryozovsky District, Bolshemurtinsky District, Divnogorsk, Kedrovy, Krasnoyarsk (Kirovsky, Leninsky, Sverdlovsky), Mansky District, Sosnovoborsk, Sukhobuzimsky District, Uyarsky District, Yemelyanovsky District, Zheleznogorsk
After the 1995 redistricting the constituency was slightly changed, gaining Bolshemurtinsky and Sukhobuzimsky districts to the north from Achinsk constituency.

2016–present: Beryozovsky District (Magansky, Zykovsky), Borodino, Irbeysky District, Kansk, Kansky District, Krasnoyarsk (Kirovsky, Leninsky, Sverdlovsky), Mansky District, Partizansky District, Krasnoyarsk Krai, Rybinsky District, Sayansky District, Uyarsky District, Zelenogorsk
The constituency was re-created for the 2016 election, it retained its portion of Krasnoyarsk but was reconfigured to eastern Krasnoyarsk Krai, which formerly constituted southern part of Kansk constituency. The rest of its former territory was split between Divnogorsk (southern half), Central and Yeniseysk (northern half) constituencies.

== Members elected ==
Election	Member	Party
1993	Vladimir Tikhonov	Independent
1995	Vladimir Tetelmin	Democratic Choice of Russia – United Democrats
1999	Valery Zubov	Independent
2003	Valery Zubov	Independent
2007	Proportional representation - no election by constituency	
2011	Proportional representation - no election by constituency	
2016	Yury Shvytkin (Note: died in March 2026)	United Russia
2021	Yury Shvytkin	United Russia
2026	Oleg Likontsev	United Russia

== Election results ==
=== 1993 ===
==== Declared candidates ====
- Yury Bybin (Independent), nonprofit chairman
- Valery Gladchuk (APR), chairman of the regional agricultural union
- Yury Grudin (Choice of Russia), chief of Krasnoyarsk Sverdlovsky City District militsiya
- Vladimir Sheremetov (Independent), businessman
- Boris Shirobokov (BR–NI), secretary of the Russian Union of Youth regional office
- Vladimir Tikhonov (Independent), former People's Deputy of Russia (1990–1993)

==== Results ====
Summary of the 12 December 1993 Russian legislative election in the Krasnoyarsk constituency
Candidate	Party	Votes	%
Vladimir Tikhonov	Independent	61,366	20.64%
Yury Grudin	Choice of Russia	–	15.70%
Yury Bybin	Independent	–	–
Valery Gladchuk	Agrarian Party	–	–
Vladimir Sheremetov	Independent	–	–
Boris Shirobokov	Future of Russia–New Names	–	–
Total		246,109	100%

=== 1995 ===
==== Declared candidates ====
- Yury Abakumov (Independent), Member of Legislative Assembly of Krasnoyarsk Krai (1994–present), businessman
- Vladimir Ivanov (LDPR), Member of State Duma (1994–present)
- Nikolay Park (Independent), former People's Deputy of Russia (1990–1993), pipe blanks factory director
- Valery Pozdnyakov (NDR), Mayor of Krasnoyarsk (1991–present), 1993 gubernatorial candidate
- Aleksandr Puzanov (Independent), further mathematics associate professor
- Vladimir Shkutan (Independent), sovkhoz director
- Igor Smirnov (Yabloko), former People's Deputy of Russia (1990–1993)
- Anatoly Tayursky (Independent), Member of Legislative Assembly of Krasnoyarsk Krai (1994–present), tekhnikum union director
- Vladimir Tetelmin (DVR–OD), Member of State Duma (1994–present)
- Vladimir Tikhonov (V–N!), incumbent Member of State Duma (1994–present)

==== Results ====
Summary of the 17 December 1995 Russian legislative election in the Krasnoyarsk constituency
Candidate	Party	Votes	%
Vladimir Tetelmin	Democratic Choice of Russia – United Democrats	49,556	14.36%
Valery Pozdnyakov	Our Home – Russia	49,306	14.29%
Yury Abakumov	Independent	38,974	11.29%
Vladimir Ivanov	Liberal Democratic Party	29,471	8.54%
Igor Smirnov	Yabloko	26,598	7.71%
Nikolay Park	Independent	24,227	7.02%
Vladimir Tikhonov (incumbent)	Power to the People	23,885	6.92%
Anatoly Tayursky	Independent	23,701	6.87%
Vladimir Shkutan	Independent	22,196	6.43%
Aleksandr Puzanov	Independent	6,897	2.00%
against all		44,407	12.87%
Total		345,066	100%

=== 1999 ===
==== Declared candidates ====
- Yury Abakumov (CPRF), Member of Legislative Assembly of Krasnoyarsk Krai (1994–present), businessman, 1995 candidate for this seat
- Sergey Bykov (Independent), former Member of Legislative Assembly of Krasnoyarsk Krai (1994–1997), businessman
- Oleg Fyodorov (Independent), chairman of the Yury Boldyrev Movement regional office
- Yury Kachayev (ROS), businessman
- Andrey Kochenov (Independent), journalist, community activist
- Sergey Nefedov (Independent), garrison House of Military Officers chief
- Svetlana Oskina (Independent), sanatorium chief doctor
- Sergey Pokidko (Independent), businessman
- Aleksandr Puzanov (RSP), Member of Krasnoyarsk City Council (1997–present), 1995 candidate for this seat
- Vladimir Tetelmin (Independent), incumbent Member of State Duma (1994–present)
- Sergey Vidov (Independent), television presenter
- Valery Zubov (Independent), former Governor of Krasnoyarsk Krai (1993–1998)

==== Failed to qualify ====
- Sergey Arefyev (Independent)

==== Did not file ====
- Viktor Astafyev (Independent)
- Valery Bochkaryov (Independent), chairman of the Congress of Russian Communities regional office
- Aleksandr Kuznetsov (Independent)
- Yury Makagon (Independent)
- Anatoly Mamayev (Independent), entrepreneur
- Aleksandr Potylitsyn (Independent), merchandiser
- Yevgeny Savinov (Independent), steel plant director
- Vladimir Shubkin (Independent), Krasnoyarsk State Medical Academy department of traumatology, orthopedics and field medicine head
- Vladimir Yegorov (Independent)

==== Results ====
Summary of the 19 December 1999 Russian legislative election in the Krasnoyarsk constituency
Candidate	Party	Votes	%
Valery Zubov	Independent	99,743	33.30%
Yury Abakumov	Communist Party	55,795	18.63%
Sergey Bykov	Independent	39,918	13.33%
Sergey Pokidko	Independent	21,721	7.25%
Vladimir Tetelmin (incumbent)	Independent	18,099	6.04%
Svetlana Oskina	Independent	4,732	1.58%
Sergey Vidov	Independent	4,273	1.43%
Yury Kachayev	Russian All-People's Union	3,495	1.17%
Oleg Fyodorov	Independent	2,511	0.84%
Andrey Kochenov	Independent	2,266	0.76%
Aleksandr Puzanov	Russian Socialist Party	1,935	0.65%
Sergey Nefedov	Independent	1,310	0.44%
against all		39,428	13.16%
Total		299,561	100%

=== 2003 ===
==== Declared candidates ====
- Vladimir Bedarev (CPRF), aide to State Duma member Pyotr Romanov
- Artyom Chernykh (LDPR), Member of Krasnoyarsk City Council of Deputies (2002–present)
- Marina Dobrovolskaya (Independent), Member of Legislative Assembly of Krasnoyarsk Krai (2001–present), television presenter
- Tamara Dobryak (Independent), housing utilities expert
- Vladimir Germanovich (PVR-RPZh), space technology executive
- Olga Likhtina (Independent), lawyer
- Yelena Martynenko (Independent), journalist
- Leonid Pankrats (VR–ES), businessman
- Sergey Zhabinsky (SPS), Member of Achinsk City Council of People's Deputies (2000–present)
- Valery Zubov (Independent), incumbent Member of State Duma (2000–present), Chairman of the Duma Committee on Credit Organizations and Financial Markets (2002–present)

==== Did not file ====
- Vladimir Frolov (Independent), rail engineer
- Ivan Lebedintsev (DPR), refrigerator plant chief power engineer
- Fyodor Maryasov (KPE), marketing executive
- Aleksandr Potylitsyn (Independent), merchandiser, 1999 candidate for this seat, 2002 gubernatorial candidate

==== Results ====
Summary of the 7 December 2003 Russian legislative election in the Krasnoyarsk constituency
Candidate	Party	Votes	%
Valery Zubov (incumbent)	Independent	101,190	40.79%
Marina Dobrovolskaya	Independent	74,264	29.94%
Vladimir Bedarev	Communist Party	19,509	7.86%
Artyom Chernykh	Liberal Democratic Party	5,263	2.12%
Vladimir Germanovich	Party of Russia's Rebirth-Russian Party of Life	3,776	1.52%
Yelena Martynenko	Independent	3,238	1.31%
Olga Likhtina	Independent	2,888	1.16%
Sergey Zhabinsky	Union of Right Forces	2,357	0.95%
Tamara Dobryak	Independent	1,969	0.79%
Leonid Pankrats	Great Russia – Eurasian Union	525	0.21%
against all		29,337	11.83%
Total		248,372	100%

=== 2016 ===
==== Declared candidates ====
- Aleksandr Gornostayev (Rodina), construction businessman
- Tatyana Osipova (CPCR), Member of Kansk City Council of Deputies (2005–present), legal intern
- Sergey Shakhmatov (The Greens), former Deputy Minister of Natural Resources and Forestry of Krasnoyarsk Krai (2013–2015), former Member of Legislative Assembly of Krasnoyarsk Krai (2007–2011)
- Yury Shvytkin (United Russia), Member of Legislative Assembly of Krasnoyarsk Krai (2001–present)
- Aleksey Slonov (CPRF), former Member of Zelenogorsk City Council of Deputies (2005–2011)
- Artyom Tarasov (Yabloko), former Member of State Duma (1994–1995), 1996 presidential candidate, 2002 gubernatorial candidate
- Sergey Titov (LDPR), Member of Irbeysky District Council of Deputies (2015–present), businessman
- Vladimir Vladimirov (Patriots of Russia), Member of Krasnoyarsk City Council of Deputies (2013–present), businessman
- Andrey Zberovsky (A Just Russia), Krasnoyarsk State Pedagogical University department of general history head, 2002 gubernatorial candidate

==== Results ====
Summary of the 18 September 2016 Russian legislative election in the Krasnoyarsk constituency
Candidate	Party	Votes	%
Yury Shvytkin	United Russia	83,257	44.21%
Sergey Titov	Liberal Democratic Party	21,799	11.58%
Aleksey Slonov	Communist Party	21,557	11.45%
Vladimir Vladimirov	Patriots of Russia	15,204	8.07%
Andrey Zberovsky	A Just Russia	10,618	5.64%
Tatyana Osipova	Communists of Russia	10,587	5.62%
Aleksandr Gornostayev	Rodina	5,794	3.08%
Artyom Tarasov	Yabloko	5,578	2.96%
Sergey Shakhmatov	The Greens	3,494	1.86%
Total		188,305	100%

=== 2021 ===
==== Declared candidates ====
- Sergey Buchenik (RPPSS), technical equipment businessman
- Igor Flyagin (SR–ZP), Member of Zelenogorsk City Council of Deputies (2014–2016, 2018–present)
- Oleg Kolesnikov (CPCR), security guard
- Ivan Korostelev (New People), former municipal school food production facility director
- Sergey Natarov (LDPR), Member of State Duma (2016–present)
- Sergey Shakhmatov (The Greens), Member of Krasnoyarsk City Council of Deputies (2018–present), former Member of Legislative Assembly of Krasnoyarsk Krai (2007–2011), 2016 candidate for this seat
- Yury Shvytkin (United Russia), incumbent Member of State Duma (2016–present)
- Sergey Tokov (CPRF), Member of Kansk City Council of Deputies (2015–present)

==== Results ====
Summary of the 17-19 September 2021 Russian legislative election in the Krasnoyarsk constituency
Candidate	Party	Votes	%
Yury Shvytkin (incumbent)	United Russia	73,325	36.96%
Sergey Natarov	Liberal Democratic Party	29,519	14.88%
Sergey Tokov	Communist Party	26,846	13.53%
Oleg Kolesnikov	Communists of Russia	13,629	6.87%
Ivan Korostelev	New People	13,500	6.81%
Igor Flyagin	A Just Russia — For Truth	13,353	6.73%
Sergey Shakhmatov	The Greens	10,672	5.38%
Sergey Buchenik	Party of Pensioners	6,840	3.45%
Total		198,367	100%

=== 2026 ===
==== Declared candidates ====
- Vladislav Aleynikov (The Greens), travel blogger
- Konstantin Bazarny (New People), entrepreneur, housing utilities expert
- Nikolay Gorkovenko (RPPSS), veterans' organization chairman
- Irina Kraynik (A Just Russia), Member of Mansky District Council of Deputies (2010–present), entrepreneur
- Oleg Likontsev (United Russia), Member of Kansky District Council of Deputies (2025–present), cossack yesaul, Hero of Russia (2023)
- Ivan Petrov (LDPR), Member of Krasnoyarsk City Council of Deputies (2023–present), businessman
- Aleksandr Shatilov (Rodina), chairman of the party regional office (2020–present)
- Maksim Zolotukhin (CPRF), Member of Legislative Assembly of Krasnoyarsk Krai (2021–present)

==== Did not file ====
- Aleksandr Podyashchenko (CPCR), trading executive, perennial candidate

==== Results ====
Summary of the 18-20 September 2026 Russian legislative election in the Krasnoyarsk constituency
Candidate	Party	Votes	%
Oleg Likontsev	United Russia	71,886	31.36%
Maksim Zolotukhin	Communist Party	46,890	20.46%
Ivan Petrov	Liberal Democratic Party	34,694	15.14%
Konstantin Bazarny	New People	21,914	9.56%
Irina Kraynik	A Just Russia	13,535	5.90%
Nikolay Gorkovenko	Party of Pensioners	12,365	5.39%
Vladislav Aleynikov	The Greens	11,361	4.96%
Aleksandr Shatilov	Rodina	5,604	2.44%
Total		229,220	100%
