= Central constituency (Krasnoyarsk Krai) =

Central single-member constituency
- Constituency of the Russian State Duma

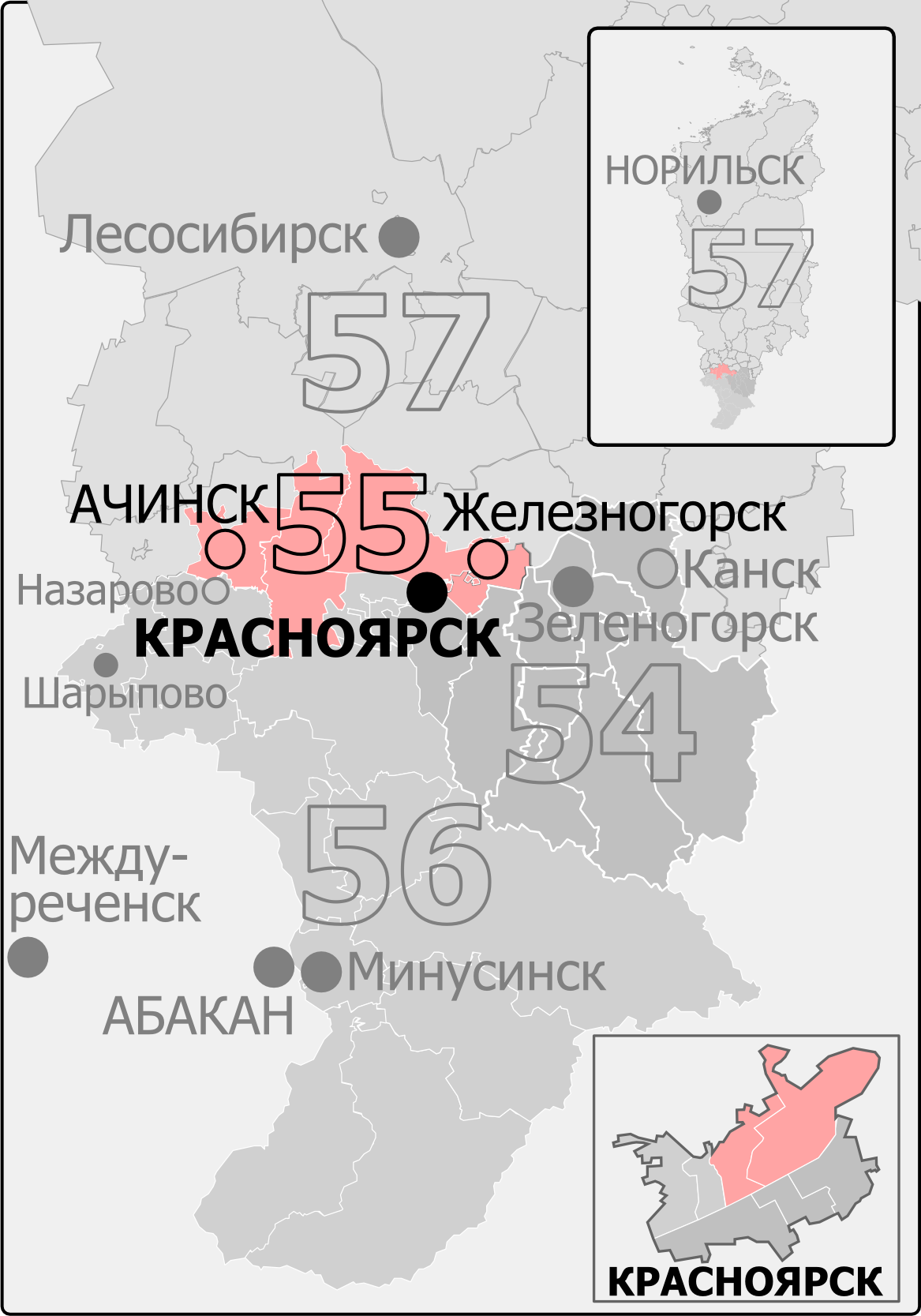
- Constituency boundaries since 2016
- Deputy: Aleksandr Drozdov; United Russia
- Federal subject: Krasnoyarsk Krai
- Districts: Achinsk, Achinsky, Beryozovsky (Barkhatovsky, Beryozovka, Voznesensky, Yesaulsky), Krasnoyarsk (Sovetsky, Tsentralny), Kozulsky, Sosnovoborsk, Yemelyanovsky (Chastoostrovsky, Elitovsky, Garevsky, Kedrovy, Mikhaylovsky, Nikolsky, Pamyati 13 Bortsov, Shuvayevsky, Solontsovsky, Talsky, Ustyugsky, Yelovsky, Yemelyanovo), ZATO Zheleznogorsk
- Voters: 572,974 (2026)

The Central constituency (No.59 (Note: Yeniseysky constituency No.47 in 1993-1995, Yeniseysky constituency No.46 in 1995-2003, Yeniseysky constituency No.48 in 2003-2007, No.55 in 2016–2026)) is a Russian legislative constituency in Krasnoyarsk Krai. The constituency covers parts of Krasnoyarsk as well as central Krasnoyarsk Krai stretching from Achinsk to Zheleznogorsk.

The constituency has been represented since 2021 by United Russia deputy Aleksandr Drozdov, a Rusal executive, who won the open seat, after defeating two-term United Russia incumbent Pyotr Pimashkov in the primary (Pimashkov died prior to the general election).

== Boundaries ==
1993–2007 Yeniseysky constituency: Krasnoyarsk (Oktyabrsky, Sovetsky, Tsentralny, Zheleznodorozhny), Norilsk
The constituency covered northern half of Krasnoyarsk on the left bank of Yenisey and the exclave city of Norilsk 1,500 km north of Krasnoyarsk. The Krasnoyarsk portion of the constituency was entirely surrounded by Krasnoyarsk constituency, while its Norilsk portion – by Taymyr constituency.

2016–present: Achinsk, Achinsky District, Beryozovsky District (Barkhatovsky, Beryozovka, Voznesensky, Yesaulsky), Kedrovy, Krasnoyarsk (Sovetsky, Tsentralny), Kozulsky District, Sosnovoborsk, Yemelyanovsky District (Chastoostrovsky, Elitovsky, Garevsky, Mikhaylovsky, Nikolsky, Pamyati 13 Bortsov, Shuvayevsky, Solontsovsky, Talsky, Ustyugsky, Yelovsky, Yemelyanovo), Zheleznogorsk
The constituency was re-created for the 2016 election, it retained only Sovetsky and Tsentralny city districts of Krasnoyarsk, losing Oktyabrsky and Zheleznodorozhny city districts to Divnogorsk constituency, and Norilsk to Yeniseysk constituency. This seat instead gained areas to the north (from Krasnoyarsk constituency) and northwest (from Achinsk constituency) of the city, including the towns of Achinsk and Zheleznogorsk.

== Members elected ==
| Election | Member | Party |
|---|---|---|
| 1993 | Valery Kolmakov | Independent |
| 1995 | Nellya Zhukova | Independent |
| 1999 | Aleksandr Klyukin | Independent |
| 2003 | Raisa Karmazina | United Russia |
| 2007 | Proportional representation - no election by constituency | |
| 2011 | Proportional representation - no election by constituency | |
| 2016 | Pyotr Pimashkov (Note: died in August 2021) | United Russia |
| 2021 | Aleksandr Drozdov | United Russia |
| 2026 | Aleksandr Drozdov | United Russia |

== Election results ==
=== 1993 ===
==== Declared candidates ====
- Yury Bykovsky (APR), regional agrarian centre director
- Aleksandr Gorelik (PRES), criminal law professor, human rights activist
- Vladimir Ivanov (LDPR), cooperative chairman
- Valery Kolmakov (Independent), Chief of Norilsk Militsiya (1988–present), militsiya colonel
- Stanislav Novokhatsky (Independent), Krasnoyarsk city polyclinic chief doctor
- Aleksey Sumarokov (Independent), entrepreneur
- Vladimir Tetelmin (Choice of Russia), former Member of Krasnoyarsk City Council of People's Deputies (1990–1993), water supply professor

==== Results ====
Summary of the 12 December 1993 Russian legislative election in the Yeniseysky constituency
| Candidate | Party | Votes | % |
|---|---|---|---|
| Valery Kolmakov | Independent | 37,394 | 17.58% |
| Vladimir Ivanov | Liberal Democratic Party | – | 14.49% |
| Yury Bykovsky | Agrarian Party | – | – |
| Aleksandr Gorelik | Party of Russian Unity and Accord | – | – |
| Stanislav Novokhatsky | Independent | – | – |
| Aleksey Sumarokov | Independent | – | – |
| Vladimir Tetelmin | Choice of Russia | – | – |
| Total | | 212,752 | 100% |

=== 1995 ===
==== Declared candidates ====
- Vera Avdeyeva (Independent), kindergarten principal
- Raisa Karmazina (NDR), Member of Legislative Assembly of Krasnoyarsk Krai (1994–present), head of the Federal Treasury Norilsk office (1992–present)
- Valery Lukinykh (KRO), former Member of Krasnoyarsk City Council of People's Deputies (1990–1993), stock exchange director
- Vladimir Minin (Independent)
- Larisa Nechayeva (LDPR), director general of FC Spartak Moscow (1994–present)
- Oleg Nifantyev (Independent), Head of the Ministry of Health of Russia Department of Scientific Research (1993–present), former People's Deputy of Russia (1990–1993)
- Oleg Pashchenko (Derzhava), journalist
- Viktor Sitnov (Independent), former People's Deputy of Russia (1990–1993), Norilsk Nickel union leader
- Yevgeny Strigin (Independent), retired KGB podpolkovnik
- Nellya Zhukova (Independent), former Prosecutor of Krasnoyarsk (1982–1995)

==== Declined ====
- Yelena Ivanova (LDPR), wife of State Duma member Vladimir Ivanov
- Valery Kolmakov (Independent), incumbent Member of State Duma (1994–present) (ran in the Achinsk constituency)

==== Results ====
Summary of the 17 December 1995 Russian legislative election in the Yeniseysky constituency
| Candidate | Party | Votes | % |
|---|---|---|---|
| Nellya Zhukova | Independent | 104,146 | 35.30% |
| Viktor Sitnov | Independent | 64,330 | 21.80% |
| Raisa Karmazina | Our Home – Russia | 30,577 | 10.36% |
| Oleg Pashchenko | Derzhava | 15,680 | 5.31% |
| Yevgeny Strigin | Independent | 15,215 | 5.16% |
| Larisa Nechayeva | Liberal Democratic Party | 14,448 | 4.90% |
| Oleg Nifantyev | Independent | 9,226 | 3.13% |
| Valery Lukinykh | Congress of Russian Communities | 6,388 | 2.17% |
| Vera Avdeyeva | Independent | 5,966 | 2.02% |
| Vladimir Minin | Independent | 1,219 | 0.41% |
| against all | | 24,966 | 8.46% |
| Total | | 295,053 | 100% |

=== 1999 ===
==== Declared candidates ====
- Aleksandr Kashin (Independent), Mayor of Kyzyl (1998–present)
- Valery Kirilets (Yabloko), Member of Krasnoyarsk City Council of Deputies (1997–present), 1998 gubernatorial candidate
- Aleksandr Klyukin (Independent), Member of Legislative Assembly of Krasnoyarsk Krai (1997–present), television executive
- Vladimir Rachin (ROS), non-ferrous metals plant worker
- Nikolay Rybkin (Independent), former Deputy Chief of the Yuri Gagarin Cosmonaut Training Center, retired FSB colonel
- Nadezhda Safonova (Independent), Member of Krasnoyarsk City Council of Deputies (1997–present)
- Veniamin Sokolov (Independent), Auditor of the Accounts Chamber of Russia (1995–present), former Chairman of the Supreme Council of Russia Soviet of the Republic (1993)
- Boris Turutin (RSP), Krasnoyarsk State Academy of Architecture and Construction department of water supply and sewage head
- Andrey Yavisya (Independent), chief doctor of the Krasnoyarsk Railway
- Albert Zhukov (Independent), aircraft captain at Krasnoyarsk Airlines
- Nellya Zhukova (Independent), incumbent Member of State Duma (1996–present)

==== Withdrawn candidates ====
- Valery Aralkin (NDR), chairman of the Sberbank Krasnoyarsk Bank (1995–present)
- Viktor Sitnov (Independent), former People's Deputy of Russia (1990–1993), Norilsk Nickel executive, 1995 candidate for this seat (ran for Duma of the Taymyr Autonomous Okrug)

==== Failed to qualify ====
- Vladimir Davydov (Independent)
- Viktor Rudchuk (Independent)
- Albert Vasimov (Independent)
- Kirill Zakharov (Independent), consumer cooperation expert

==== Results ====
Summary of the 19 December 1999 Russian legislative election in the Yeniseysky constituency
| Candidate | Party | Votes | % |
|---|---|---|---|
| Aleksandr Klyukin | Independent | 65,003 | 24.89% |
| Veniamin Sokolov | Independent | 40,034 | 15.33% |
| Andrey Yavisya | Independent | 22,005 | 8.43% |
| Valery Kirilets | Yabloko | 17,706 | 6.78% |
| Nellya Zhukova (incumbent) | Independent | 14,978 | 5.74% |
| Nikolay Rybkin | Independent | 13,414 | 5.14% |
| Nadezhda Safonova | Independent | 11,046 | 4.23% |
| Albert Zhukov | Independent | 9,055 | 3.47% |
| Vladimir Rachin | Russian All-People's Union | 2,904 | 1.11% |
| Aleksandr Kashin | Independent | 2,110 | 0.81% |
| Boris Turutin | Russian Socialist Party | 2,091 | 0.80% |
| against all | | 56,336 | 21.58% |
| Total | | 261,113 | 100% |

=== 2003 ===
==== Declared candidates ====
- Valentin Danilov (Independent), plasma physicist
- Raisa Karmazina (United Russia), Member of Legislative Assembly of Krasnoyarsk Krai (1994–present), 1995 NDR candidate for this seat
- Oleg Koledov (LDPR), aide to State Duma member
- Nikolay Smyk (CPRF), former Member of Legislative Assembly of Krasnoyarsk Krai (1994–2001), former People's Deputy of the Soviet Union (1989–1991)
- Natalya Sysoyeva (PVR-RPZh), former Deputy Mayor of Krasnoyarsk (1999–2001)

==== Did not file ====
- Vladimir Negodin (Independent), retired rugby player
- Galina Seibel (Independent), physician, community activist

==== Declined ====
- Aleksandr Klyukin (United Russia), incumbent Member of State Duma (2000–present) (ran in the Achinsk constituency)

==== Results ====
Summary of the 7 December 2003 Russian legislative election in the Yeniseysky constituency
| Candidate | Party | Votes | % |
|---|---|---|---|
| Raisa Karmazina | United Russia | 100,426 | 45.21% |
| Nikolay Smyk | Communist Party | 21,988 | 9.90% |
| Natalya Sysoyeva | Party of Russia's Rebirth-Russian Party of Life | 19,965 | 8.99% |
| Valentin Danilov | Independent | 14,256 | 6.42% |
| Oleg Koledov | Liberal Democratic Party | 11,292 | 5.08% |
| against all | | 50,548 | 22.75% |
| Total | | 222,336 | 100% |

=== 2016 ===
==== Declared candidates ====
- Yevgeny Baburin (PARNAS), chairman of the party regional office (2014–present)
- Aleksandr Gliskov (LDPR), Deputy Chairman of the Krasnoyarsk City Council of Deputies (2013–present), Member of the Council of Deputies (2008–present)
- Anton Gurov (CPCR), cement executive
- Maksim Markert (A Just Russia), Member of Legislative Assembly of Krasnoyarsk Krai (2011–present), construction executive
- Pyotr Pimashkov (United Russia), Member of State Duma (2011–present)
- Natalia Podolyak (The Greens), physical culture associate professor
- Ivan Serebryakov (Patriots of Russia), Member of Krasnoyarsk City Council of Deputies (2013–present), mechanical plant director
- Anatoly Urdayev (Rodina), businessman, retired FSB officer
- Pyotr Vychuzhanin (CPRF), Member of Yemelyanovsky District Council of Deputies (2010–present), party secretary

==== Failed to qualify ====
- Pyotr Moiseyev (Independent), unemployed, United Russia primary candidate
- Vladislav Patrakov (Independent), pensioner
- Aleksey Yurkov (Independent), pensioner

==== Results ====
Summary of the 18 September 2016 Russian legislative election in the Central constituency
| Candidate | Party | Votes | % |
|---|---|---|---|
| Pyotr Pimashkov | United Russia | 75,957 | 40.78% |
| Aleksandr Gliskov | Liberal Democratic Party | 34,202 | 18.36% |
| Ivan Serebryakov | Patriots of Russia | 21,661 | 11.63% |
| Pyotr Vychuzhanin | Communist Party | 18,622 | 10.00% |
| Maksim Markert | A Just Russia | 7,885 | 4.23% |
| Natalia Podolyak | The Greens | 6,053 | 3.25% |
| Anton Gurov | Communists of Russia | 5,870 | 3.15% |
| Yevgeny Baburin | People's Freedom Party | 3,799 | 2.04% |
| Anatoly Urdayev | Rodina | 3,205 | 1.72% |
| Total | | 186,260 | 100% |

=== 2021 ===
==== Declared candidates ====
- Maksim Bombakov (Yabloko), legal counsel
- Aleksandr Drozdov (United Russia), Member of Krasnoyarsk City Council of Deputies (2018–present), Rusal executive
- Maksim Markert (SR–ZP), Member of Legislative Assembly of Krasnoyarsk Krai (2011–2016, 2018–present), 2016 candidate for this seat
- Andrey Seleznyov (CPCR), former Member of Krasnoyarsk City Council of Deputies (2008–2013), social centre director, perennial candidate
- Denis Terekhov (New People), PR strategist, business consultant
- Gennady Torgunakov (RPPSS), former Member of Krasnoyarsk City Council of Deputies (2013–2018), construction businessman
- Mikhail Trebin (The Greens), chiropractor
- Vasily Yermakov (CPRF), gym teacher

==== Withdrawn candidates ====
- Aleksandr Gliskov (LDPR), Member of Legislative Assembly of Krasnoyarsk Krai (2016–present), 2016 candidate for this seat (withdrew on August 12, 2021)

==== Failed to qualify ====
- Grigory Kolesov (Independent), lawyer
- Ivan Serebryakov (Independent), Member of Legislative Assembly of Krasnoyarsk Krai (2016–present), 2014 and 2018 gubernatorial candidate, 2016 Patriots of Russia candidate for this seat

==== Declined ====
- Pyotr Pimashkov (United Russia), incumbent Member of State Duma (2011–2021) (lost the primary, ran on the party list, died on August 12, 2021)

==== Results ====
Summary of the 17-19 September 2021 Russian legislative election in the Central constituency
| Candidate | Party | Votes | % |
|---|---|---|---|
| Aleksandr Drozdov | United Russia | 61,872 | 29.21% |
| Vasily Yermakov | Communist Party | 37,722 | 17.81% |
| Denis Terekhov | New People | 26,792 | 12.65% |
| Mikhail Trebin | The Greens | 19,206 | 9.07% |
| Maksim Markert | A Just Russia — For Truth | 18,309 | 8.64% |
| Andrey Seleznyov | Communists of Russia | 17,475 | 8.25% |
| Gennady Torgunakov | Party of Pensioners | 12,167 | 5.74% |
| Maksim Bombakov | Yabloko | 5,836 | 2.75% |
| Total | | 211,843 | 100% |

=== 2026 ===
==== Declared candidates ====
- Aleksandr Drozdov (United Russia), incumbent Member of State Duma (2021–present)
- Yury Isayev (CPCR), entrepreneur
- Semyon Karayev (The Greens), businessman
- Yevgeny Kiriyenko (RPPSS), former Member of Achinsky District Council of Deputies (2010–2015, 2020–2025), oil refinery worker
- Mikhail Martynyuk (New People), attorney
- Vladimir Ozeredenko (A Just Russia), Member of Achinsky District Council of Deputies (2025–present), property management executive
- Nikolay Sattarov (CPRF), Member of Divnogorsk City Council of Deputies (2010–present), rescue worker
- Semyon Sendersky (LDPR), Member of Krasnoyarsk City Council of Deputies (2018–present)
- Vitaly Telin (Rodina), Member of Kozulsky District Council of Deputies (2010–present), lawyer

==== Results ====
Summary of the 18-20 September 2026 Russian legislative election in the Central constituency
| Candidate | Party | Votes | % |
|---|---|---|---|
| Aleksandr Drozdov (incumbent) | United Russia | 86,040 | 32.96% |
| Nikolay Sattarov | Communist Party | 35,199 | 13.48% |
| Semyon Sendersky | Liberal Democratic Party | 32,109 | 12.30% |
| Mikhail Martynyuk | New People | 32,063 | 12.28% |
| Yury Isayev | Communists of Russia | 22,479 | 8.61% |
| Yevgeny Kiriyenko | Party of Pensioners | 15,002 | 5.75% |
| Vladimir Ozeredenko | A Just Russia | 12,512 | 4.79% |
| Semyon Karayev | The Greens | 7,925 | 3.04% |
| Vitaly Telin | Rodina | 6,321 | 2.42% |
| Total | | 261,048 | 100% |
