= Krasnoyarsk State Technical University =

University in Krasnoyarsk, Russia

- Russian: Красноярский государственный технический университет
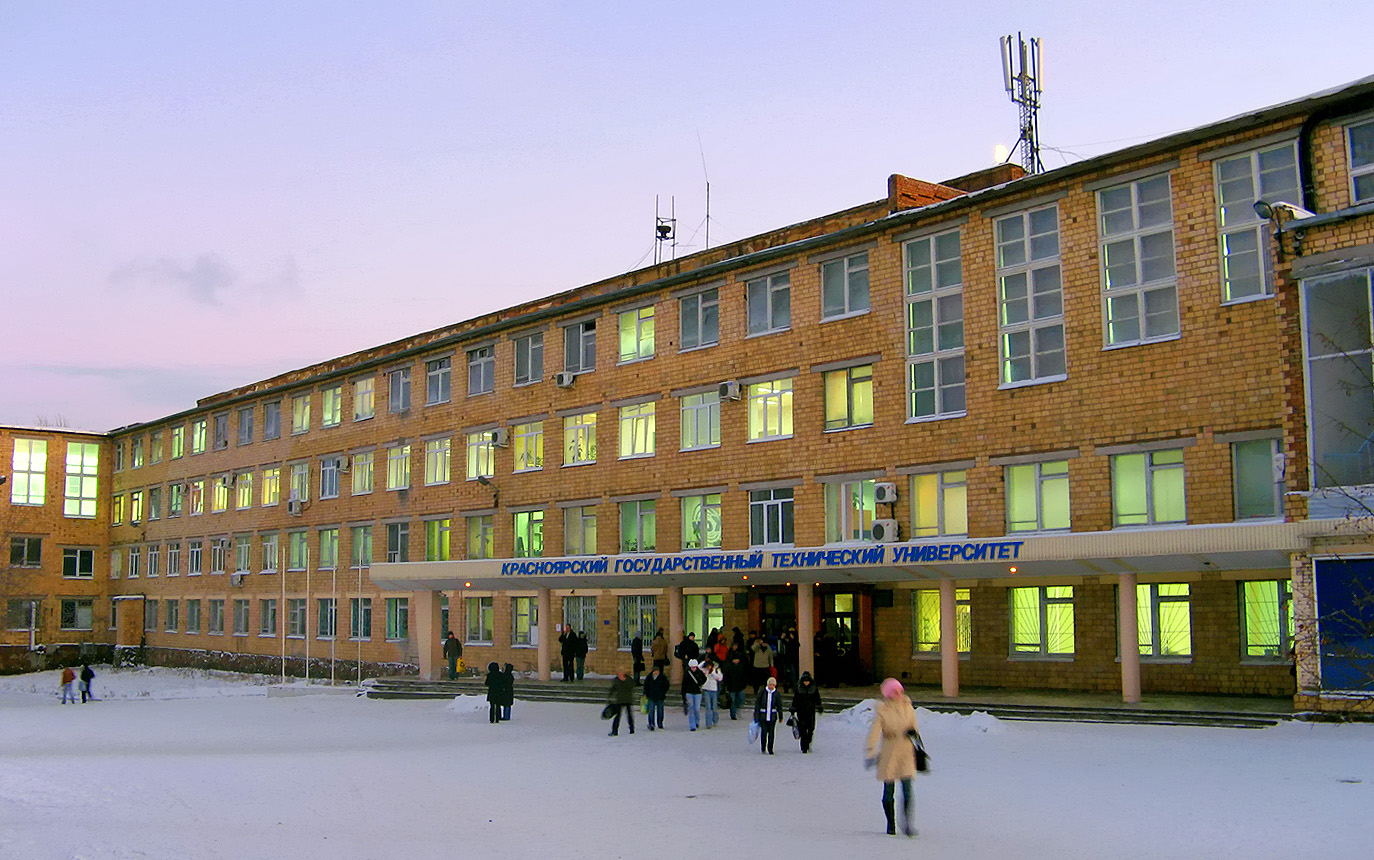
- Type: Public
- Active: 1956–2006
- Location: Krasnoyarsk, Russia; 56.0139°N 92.8715°E
- Campus: Urban

Krasnoyarsk State Technical University (KSTU) (Russian: Красноярский государственный технический университет) was a public university in the city of Krasnoyarsk, Russia. In 2006, the university joined the Siberian Federal University.

== History ==
On August 4, 1956, the Council of Ministers of the USSR, by its Decree No. 1043, allowed the opening of the Krasnoyarsk Polytechnic Institute in Krasnoyarsk. On February 23, 1974, by order of the Ministry of Higher and Secondary Specialized Education of the RSFSR, the Kyzyl branch of the Krasnoyarsk Polytechnic Institute was opened in the Tuva Autonomous Soviet Socialist Republic.

On October 18, 1981, the Krasnoyarsk Civil Engineering Institute was separated from the KrPI. On March 11, 1993, the institute received the status of a technical university and was renamed the Krasnoyarsk State Technical University.

As of 1998, KSTU provided training in 20 areas and 33 specialties in the fields of energy, manufacturing, radio electronics, computer science and computer technology, control systems, auto and air transport, economics and management. KSTU established close ties with scientific and educational institutions in the United Kingdom, Bulgaria, Hungary, Germany, China, Mongolia, the United States, Taiwan and France. KSTU was a co-founder of the international scientific and educational center "Siberia–Europe".

On November 8, 2006, the Government of the Russian Federation decided to establish the Siberian Federal University. KSTU became a part of it.

== Notable alumni ==
- Edkham Akbulatov (1960) – Russian politician, former mayor of Krasnoyarsk (2012–2017)
- Nikolay Ashlapov (1962) – Russian politician, businessman
- Lev Bashmakov (1938–2018) – Russian politician, first governor of the Ryazan Oblast (1991–1994)
- Aleksandr Bokovikov (1956–2010) – Russian politician, businessman
- Igor Farkhutdinov (1950–2003) – Russian politician, former governor of Sakhalin Oblast (1995–2003)
- Anatoliy Franchuk (1935–2021) – Ukrainian politician
- Svetlana Haustova (1968) – Russian ski-orienteering competitor
- Natalia Nazarova (1953) – Russian politician, former mayor of Nizhnekamsk, member of the 8th State Duma
- Sergei Shoigu (1955) – Russian politician and military officer, Secretary of the Security Council, former Minister of Defence
- Aleksey Shumakov (1948) – Russian wrestler
- Sergey Yeryomin (1976) – Russian politician, member of the 8th State Duma
- Viktor Zubarev (1961–2023) – Russian politician, member of the 5th, 6th, 7th and 8th State Duma

== Literature ==
- Большой энциклопедический словарь Красноярского края [Great Encyclopedic Dictionary of the Krasnoyarsk Krai] / гл. ред. А. П. Статейнов. Красноярск : Буква С, 2010. Т. 2 : [Административно-территориальное деление. Населенные пункты. Предприятия и организации]. p. 192. 515 p. (in Russian).
