= Viktor Zubarev =

Viktor Zubarev may refer to:

- Viktor Zubarev (footballer)
- Viktor Zubarev (politician)
