= Valery Zubov =

Russian politician

- Валерий Зубов
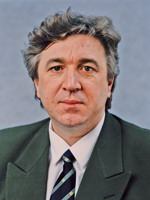

Member of the State Duma
- In office 18 January 2000 – 27 April 2016

2nd Governor of Krasnoyarsk Krai
- In office May 1993 – 4 June 1998
- Preceded by: Arkady Veprev
- Succeeded by: Alexander Lebed

Governor of Krasnoyarsk Krai (acting)
- In office 28 January 1993 – May 1993

Personal details
- Born: Valery Mikhailovich Zubov; 9 May 1953 Novospasskoye, Pervomaysky District, Tambov Oblast, Russian SFSR, Soviet Union
- Died: 27 April 2016 (aged 62) Moscow, Russia
- Party: A Just Russia (2007-2016); United Russia (until 2005); Our Home - Russia

Valery Mikhailovich Zubov (Russian: Валерий Михайлович Зубов; 9 May 1953 - 27 April 2016) was a Russian politician and economist who had served as a member of the State Duma from 2000 to 2016.

Zubov had also served as the second governor of Krasnoyarsk Krai from 1993 to 1998.

He was one of the four co-chairs of the Republican Party of Russia. He was a doctor of Economics, Professor, and specialist in the field of economic statistics. He was the author of four monographs, 27 scientific papers.

He was the professor of the Higher School of Business of Moscow State University named after M. V. Lomonosov.

== Biography ==
Valery Zubov was born on 9 May 1953 to a family of geologists.

In 1970, he graduated from high school in Lermontov, in Stavropol Krai.

In 1970 to 1971, he worked in the Kazakh SSR as a fitter of the assembly and construction department of the Ministry of Medium Machine Building.

He worked as an assistant driller in a geological exploration expedition in the Stavropol Krai, in the village of Arzgir.

In 1971, he entered the Moscow Geological Prospecting Institute named after Sergo Ordzhonikidze, but two years later he decided to transfer to the Moscow Institute of National Economy named after G.V. Plekhanov.

In 1977, he graduated with honors from the Plekhanov Moscow Institute of National Economy with a degree in national economy planning.}

In 1978 to 1979, he served in the Air Defense Forces.

In 1982, at the Moscow Institute of National Economy named after G.V. Plekhanov, he defended his dissertation for the degree of candidate of economic sciences, and, at his own request, was assigned to work in Krasnoyarsk.

Arriving from Moscow in 1982, a young candidate of sciences, Valery Mikhailovich, became the dean of the Faculty of Economics of KrasSU. Active, not indifferent, it was very interesting and happy to work with him. For everyone - whether a student, an employee - he always had kind, fair words. He, like very few, knew how to appreciate people. We were proud and proud that our Valery Mikhailovich, Doctor of Economics, became the first governor of the Krasnoyarsk Krai elected by the people. Then, having become a deputy of the State Duma, he did not prevaricate, he was not afraid to be in the minority, if his living conscience dictated so. Not only have we lost today a true friend, an intelligent person, but the country has also lost an honest statesman. Thank you for being with us...

— Yevgenya Bukharova on Zubov's death

Between 1982 and 1988, as well as from 1991 to 1992, he worked at the Krasnoyarsk State University. He went from senior lecturer to dean of the Faculty of Economics. He became the youngest dean in the country during and after Soviet times.

From 1986 to 1987, he did an internship in the United States at the University of Oklahoma, where he studied the peculiarities of the organization of labor in the US.

From 1988 to 1991, he studied at the doctoral program of the Moscow Institute of Economics and Statistics.

In 1991, at the Moscow Institute of Economics and Statistics, he defended his dissertation for the degree of Doctor of Economics on the topic "Methodology for statistical assessment of the quality of economic growth."

In 1992, Zubov became the Deputy Head of the Administration of the Krasnoyarsk Krai, as the Head of the Main Department of Economics of the Krsi Administration.

On 28 January 1993, Zubov became the acting governor (head) of Krasnoyarsk Krai. Then in April, he was elected the 2nd governor (head) of Krasnoyarsk Krai. In the fall of 1993, he supported the dissolution of the Supreme Soviet of the Russian Federation.

As Governor, he had the nickname "Regional Gaidar".

In 1993, he was nominated as a candidate member of the Federation Council in a two-mandate district from the Krasnoyarsk Krai, and from 1994 to 1995, he was a member of the Federation Council of the 1st convocation (Yenisei District No. 24), a member of the Committee on Budget, Financial, Currency and Credit Regulation, Money Issue, tax policy and customs regulation.

In 1996 to 1998, he was a member of the Federation Council of the 2nd convocation, as a deputy chairman of the Federation Council, and coordinator of the work of committees on socio-economic issues.

On 17 May 1998, Zubov was defeated in the gubernatorial election by Alexander Lebed.

In November 1998, he was the co-chairman of the Siberian socio-political movement "Union for the Future". He was a member of the Interregional Association "Siberian Agreement".

In the late 1990s, he was deputy director of the Krasnoyarsk Universal Commodity and Stock Exchange for operations with securities, as well as the founders of the Troika Krasnoyarsk stock exchange.

In 1999, he was the Professor of the Department of Social and Economic Planning of the Krasnoyarsk State University. He was a member of the National Council for Corporate Governance. He was the president of the International Association of Housing and Mortgage Funds (MAIF). He was the vice president of the Russian Chess Federation. He was a corresponding member of the Academy of Economic Sciences and Entrepreneurship of Russia.

There are very few such people in power. Valery Zubov is an absolute disinterested man, he was always guided by the interests of the country, the region, he was not a member of any clans, corporate associations, he was a true patriot of the Krasnoyarsk Krai. On the other hand, Valery Zubov is one of the most competent deputies and governors in Russia. Really understood what a budget is, how to manage it. He was not a thoughtless executor of someone's will, he was an independent person. In personal communication, a deeply intelligent, sincere and decent person. I worked with him for a long time in the administration of the region, and then maintained friendly relations. He was a trusted friend and comrade. You could always count on him, knowing that he would not let you down. Valery Zubov wanted to remain in active life, active politics, he was going to vote, but it didn’t work out ...

— Sergey Komaritsyn on Zubov

In December 1999, Zubov was elected to the State Duma from the Krasnoyarsk single-mandate constituency No. 48, gaining 33.3% of the vote. He was a member of the deputy group "People's Deputy".

From 2000 to 2002, he was a member of the State Duma Committee on Budget and Taxes.

From 2001 to 2004, he was a member of the working (tripartite) group for improving interbudgetary relations in the Russian Federation. Member of the inter-factional associations "Siberian Agreement", "Energy of Russia", "Business Russia" and "Commodity Producers of Russia". He was a member of three deputy groups in the State Duma for relations with the parliaments of Japan, Canada and Kazakhstan

In April 2002, he was elected Chairman of the State Duma Committee on Credit Organizations and Financial Markets.

In June 2002, from the State Duma, he became a member of the conciliation commission involved in overcoming disagreements on the new version of the law "On the Central Bank of Russia."

From 2002 to 2003 - Chairman of the State Duma Committee on Credit Organizations and Financial Markets.

In December 2003, he was re-elected to the State Duma from the Krasnoyarsk single-mandate constituency No. 50.

He was Deputy Chairman of the Interdepartmental Commission of the Security Council of the Russian Federation on Security in the Economic Sphere.

From 2003 to 2005, he served as First Deputy Chairman of the State Duma Committee on Credit Organizations and Financial Markets. He was a member of the Our Home - Russia party, then a member of the People's Party of the Russian Federation and the United Russia party.

On 23 April 2005, Zubov left the United Russia party and joined the Republican Party of Russia. He also left the United Russia faction in the State Duma.

From 2005 to 2007, he was a member of the political council of the Republican Party of Russia.

In 2007, he headed the electoral list of the A Just Russia party in the elections to the Legislative Assembly of the Krasnoyarsk Krai. The same year he was elected to the State Duma on the electoral list of the Just Russia party (No. 1 in the Krasnoyarsk group). He was a member of the Just Russia faction and a member of the State Duma Committee on Economic Policy and Entrepreneurship.

Valery Mikhailovich Zubov for me is not just a deputy of the State Duma, not just a governor. This is a person who is close to me, because, by chance, our destinies in the early nineties were intertwined. He played a decisive role in my entry into politics. And before that, I had to play the same role in his political fate. He was the first truly people's governor, elected without any PR, without the support of "money bags". And he had to take this post in the most difficult years in the recent history of the Krasnoyarsk Krai, when there were many months of delays in wages and an acute shortage of everything - money, coal, people's trust. And I think he did a very good job in this role. Then there were the most difficult elections, one of the most significant in our country, which could have been in favor of Zubov. And if this happened, I know for sure: he would be one of the brightest managers and politicians in Russia. He had everything for this: an excellent education (he was a real scientist), and political will, and wisdom, and the ability to talk with people. Naturally, a sharp turn in life could not but affect his personality. Nevertheless, he did not get lost - all these years he was in the public eye, he was a real deputy - with his own opinion, with a very deep state thinking, although his views on many issues sharply diverged from the official economic policy. Valery Mikhailovich Zubov is a whole era in the history of the Krasnoyarsk Krai ...

— Chairman of the Legislative Assembly of Krasnoyarsk Krai Aleskandr Uss on Zubov's death

In 2011, he again headed the party list of A Just Russia in the Krasnoyarsk Krai to participate in the Legislative Assembly. He was again elected to the State Duma the same year.

The premature departure of Valery Mikhailovich was a shock to many Krasnoyarsk residents. Valery Mikhailovich was the second governor of the Krasnoyarsk Krai, he headed the region from 1993 to 1998 - in the most difficult and turbulent period of economic and political reforms, when being in power meant taking on an enormous responsibility, not being afraid of solving the most difficult tasks and justifying trust with everyday honest work and people's hopes. This required not only knowledge, skills, managerial talent and experience, but also an outstanding character - strength, adherence to principles, courage, courage to have an opinion and be able to argue it. All these qualities, of course, were inherent in Valery Mikhailovich. He firmly and consistently defended the interests of the region both as governor and as a deputy of the State Duma, and he always perceived his positions, first of all, as an opportunity to help the development of the region, as a need to help improve the life of fellow Krasnoyarsk residents. Krasnoyarsk residents will keep the brightest, most grateful memory of Valery Mikhailovich Zubov - a bright politician, a high-class professional, a worthy person.

— Mayor of Krasnoyarsk Edkham Akbulatov and Chairman of the Krasnoyarsk City Council of Deputies Tatyana Kazanova's statement on Zubov's death

In 2014, Zubov took fourth place among the richest deputies of the State Duma from the Krasnoyarsk Krai.

Zubov was one of eight members of parliament who voted against the so-called law of Dima Yakovlev, which prohibits the adoption of Russian orphans by foreign citizens. He was also one of three deputies who abstained during the vote on the annexation of Crimea.

Valery Mikhailovich Zubov died on 27 April 2016 in Moscow after a long illness. He was buried in Moscow at the Troekurovsky cemetery.

On 9 June 2018, in Krasnoyarsk, in memory of Zubov, a memorial plaque was opened on the house number 12 "B" on Menzhinsky Street. It was there that Zubov had lived and worked from 1984 to 2016.

== Family ==
His widow, Yevgenya Zubova is an associate Porofessor of the Russian Academy of Economics. GV Plekhanov. He had a daughter, Yekaterina, son Ivan Valeryevich and grandson Ivan.
