= Sergey Yeryomin =

Russian politician

- Сергей Ерёмин
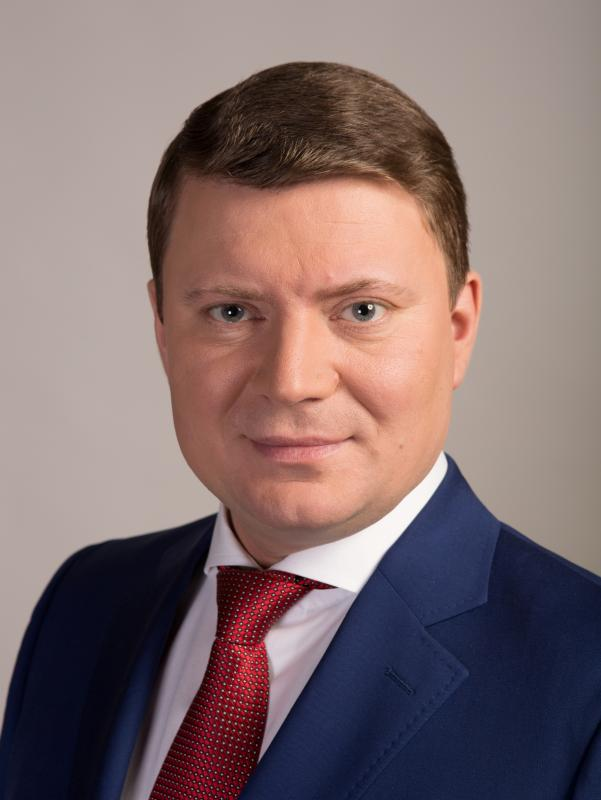

Member of the State Duma for Krasnoyarsk Krai
- Incumbent
- Assumed office 19 September 2023
- Preceded by: Viktor Zubarev
- Constituency: Divnogorsk (No. 56)

Deputy Governor of Krasnoyarsk Krai
- In office 3 August 2022 – 19 September 2023

4th Head of Krasnoyarsk
- In office 24 October 2017 – 3 August 2022
- Preceded by: Edkham Akbulatov
- Succeeded by: Vladislav Loginov

Minister of Transport of Krasnoyarsk Krai
- In office 2 May 2012 – 1 October 2017
- Preceded by: Zakhar Titov
- Succeeded by: Vadim Voitsekhovsky (Acting)

Personal details
- Born: Sergey Vasilyevich Yeryomin; 14 May 1976 Krasnoyarsk, Soviet Union
- Party: United Russia

Sergey Vasilyevich Yeryomin (Russian: Сергей Васильевич Ерёмин; born 14 May 1976), is a Russian politician who is currently a member of the State Duma since 19 September 2023.

He had also served as the Deputy Governor of Krasnoyarsk Krai from 2022 to 2023.

Yeryomin had served as the 4th Head of Krasnoyarsk from 2017 to 2022. He had also served as the Minister of Transport of the Krasnoyarsk Territory from 2012 to 2017). He is the member of the political council of the Krasnoyarsk regional branch of the United Russia party and is the chairman of the coordination council of local branches of United Russia in Krasnoyarsk.

== Biography ==
Sergey Yeryomin was born on 14 May 1976 in Krasnoyarsk.

In 1998, he graduated from the road transport department of the Krasnoyarsk State Technical University, receiving the qualification “engineer” with a specialty in “organization of transportation and management of road transport.”.

From April 1999 to March 2002, he served as an inspector of the organizational and analytical department of the State Traffic Safety Inspectorate of the Krasnoyarsk Krai.

In 2005, he graduated from Krasnoyarsk State University, receiving the qualification “lawyer” with a degree in jurisprudence.

Until June 2003, he was the leading engineer of the department of planning and organization of work on the maintenance of federal highways, as well as leading engineer of the department of planning and organization of work for the repair and maintenance of federal highways. Until August 2004, he was the acting head of the department for the development of road services and the use of rights of way. Until January 2007, he was the head of the department of road safety and road safety, as well as head of the department of road safety and toll roads; until August 2010, he was the head of the department of highway operation and road safety.

On 12 November 2010, he became the Assistant Minister of Transport of the Krasnoyarsk Krai, as well as acting Deputy Minister of Transport of the Krasnoyarsk Territory.

On 14 February 2012, he became the head of the highway department for the Krasnoyarsk Krai, and on 2 May 2012, he became the Minister of Transport of the Krasnoyarsk Krai.

On 24 October 2017, he was elected by the Krasnoyarsk City Council of Deputies (23 votes in favor out of 29) as the 4th Head of Krasnoyarsk. 26 октября 2017 года официально вступил в должность.

On 25 July 2022, it became known that Yeryomin would be appointed to the position of deputy governor of the Krasnoyarsk Krai. On July 26, the Krasnoyarsk City Council of Deputies received his appeal for early termination of powers in connection with resignation at his own request, and on 2 August 2022, the deputies agreed on the resignation at an extraordinary session.

On 3 August 2022, he became the Deputy Governor of the Krasnoyarsk Krai for the improvement of Krasnoyarsk and other cities of the region.

On 31 July 2023, the Krai Electoral Commission registered the Deputy Governor of the Krasnoyarsk Krai, Yeryomin, as a candidate from United Russia in the by-elections to the State Duma. Voting took place on September 8–10 in Divnogorsk single-mandate electoral district No. 56. Yeryomin won the elections and became a State Duma deputy. He is a member of the Committee on Transport and Transport Infrastructure.

== Scientific activity ==
In 2001, at the Krasnoyarsk State Technical University, he defended his dissertation for the degree of Candidate of Technical Sciences on the topic “Regional information system for assessing emergency situations on highways (using the example of the Krasnoyarsk Krai).”

In 2022, at Oryol State University named after. I. S. Turgenev defended his dissertation for the degree of Doctor of Technical Sciences on the topic “Methodology for organizing the transportation of passengers by urban public transport in the conditions of long-term territorial development of the city.” According to Eremin, it took him 13 years to write the work.

== Family ==
His father, Vasily Ivanovich (1953-2005), was an agronomist, director of the Tayozhny agricultural enterprise, deputy of the Legislative Assembly of the Krasnoyarsk Territory from 2001 until his death in 2005.

In 1999, Sergey married his friend Yekaterina. The date of the marriage coincided with the anniversary of the Krasnoyarsk Wedding Palace.

The couple have four daughters, Sophia, Daria and twin sisters Taisiya and Vasilisa.

He is interested in collecting airplane models.
