= Krasnoyarsk Dam =

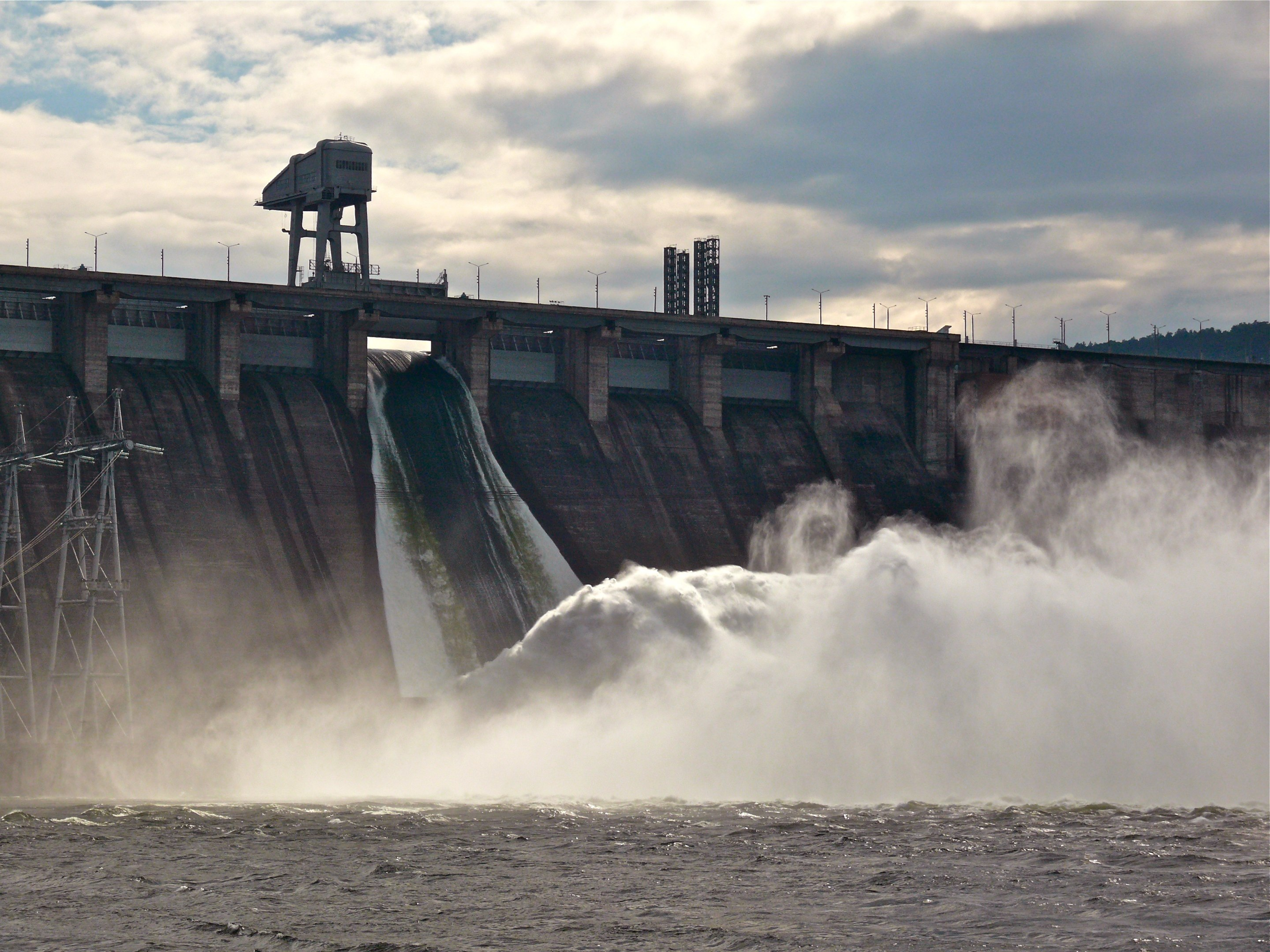
- The dam with one of its spillways open.

- Location within Krasnoyarsk Krai Location within Russia
- Interactive map of Krasnoyarsk Dam
- Location: Divnogorsk, Russia
- Coordinates: 55°56′05″N 92°17′37″E
- Construction began: 1956
- Opening date: 1972

Dam and spillways
- Type of dam: Gravity dam
- Impounds: Yenisey River
- Height: 124 m (407 ft)
- Length: 1,065 m (3,494 ft)

Reservoir
- Creates: Krasnoyarsk Reservoir
- Total capacity: 73.3 km^{3} (17.6 mi^{3})
- Surface area: 2,000 km^{2} (772 mi^{2})

Power Station
- Installed capacity: 6,000 MW

The Krasnoyarsk Dam is a 124-metre (407 ft) high concrete gravity dam located on the Yenisey River about 30 kilometres (19 mi) upstream from Krasnoyarsk in Divnogorsk, Russia. It was constructed from 1956 to 1972, and it supplies about 6,000 MW of electricity, mostly used to supply the KrAZ (Krasnoyarsky Aluminievyy Zavod, the Krasnoyarsk Aluminum Plant). Both power and aluminum plants are controlled by the RUSAL company.

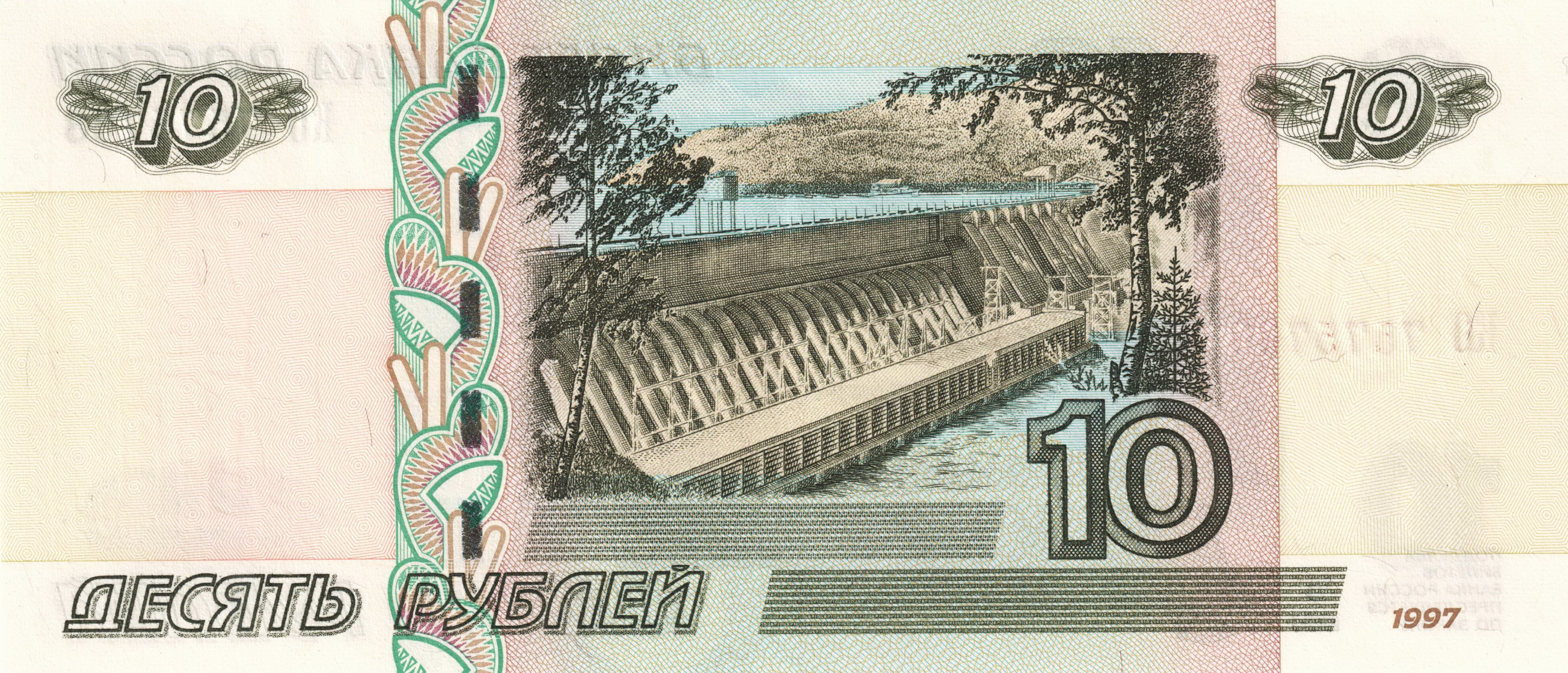
Krasnoyarsk Dam on the Russian 10-ruble banknote.

Beginning with the opening of the 10th turbine in April 1971, the powerhouse was the world's single largest power plant until the Grand Coulee Dam in Washington state reached 6,181 MW in 1983. The Krasnoyarsk Dam is held to be a landmark symbol of Krasnoyarsk, and it is depicted on the 10-ruble banknote.

As a result of the damming, the Krasnoyarsk Reservoir was created. This reservoir, informally known as the Krasnoyarsk Sea, has an area of 2,000 square kilometres (770 sq mi) and a volume of 73.3 cubic kilometres (18 cu mi). It is 388 km (241 mi) in length and 15 km (9 mi) in width at its widest, has an average depth of 36.6 m (120.1 ft), and a depth of 105 m (344 ft) near the dam.

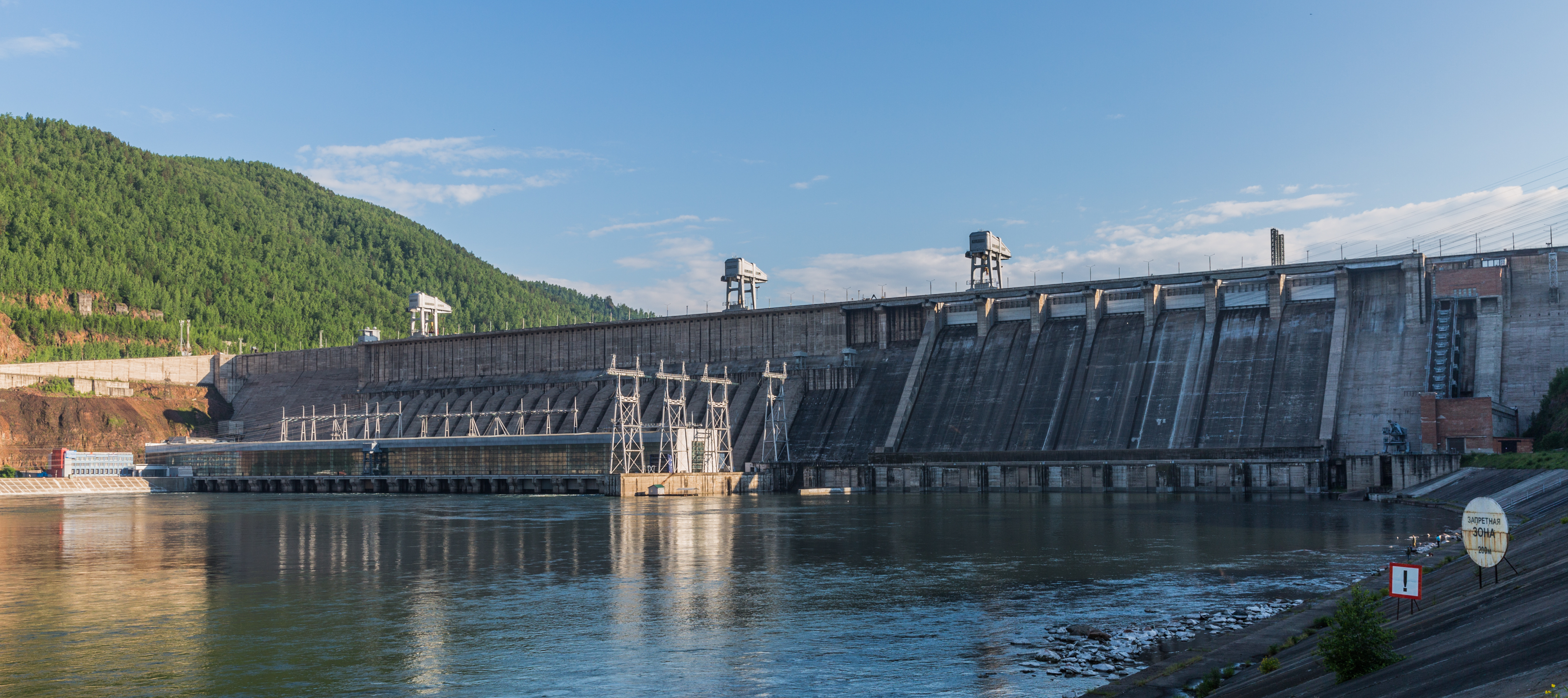
Krasnoyarsk Dam (Divnogorsk, Krasnoyarsk Krai)

The Krasnoyarsk Dam significantly influences the local climate; normally the river would freeze over in the bitterly cold Siberian winter, but because the dam releases unfrozen water year-round, the river never freezes in the 200 kilometres (120 mi) to 300 kilometres (190 mi) stretch of river immediately downstream from the dam. In winter, the frigid air interacts with the warm river water to produce fog, which shrouds Krasnoyarsk and other downstream areas.

== Ship lift ==
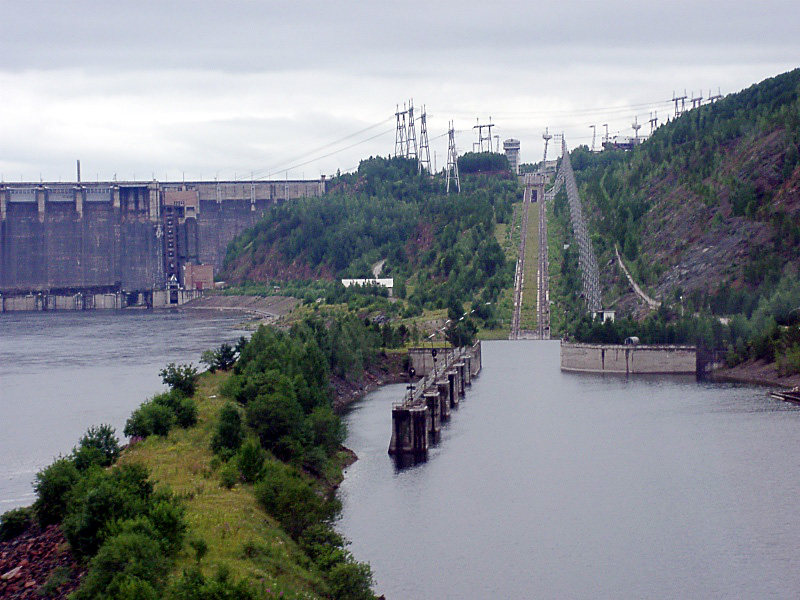
The dam's canal inclined plane, an electric rack railway

The dam is equipped with a canal inclined plane to allow passage of ships. It is in fact an electric rack railway. The track gauge is 9,000 mm (29 ft 6 5/16 in), making it the widest-gauge railway of any type in the world. At the time of its construction, this feat of modern engineering allowed for ships to be physically moved in only 90 minutes.

== See also ==
- List of power stations in Russia
