= Viktor Zubarev (politician) =

Russian politician (1961–2023)

- Виктор Зубарев
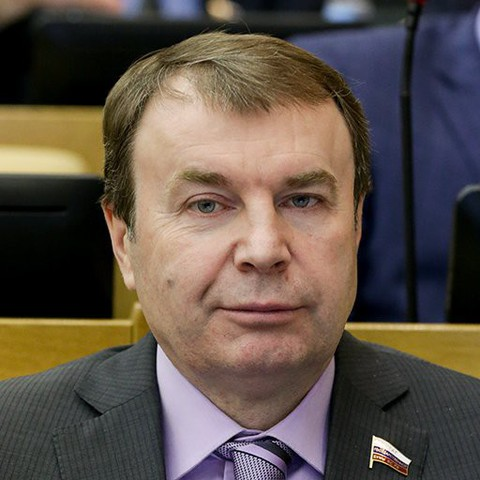
- Zubarev in 2016

Member of the State Duma for Krasnoyarsk Krai
- In office 5 October 2016 – 31 May 2023
- Preceded by: constituency re-established
- Succeeded by: Sergey Yeryomin
- Constituency: Divnogorsk (No. 56)

Member of the State Duma (Party List Seat)
- In office November 2012 – 2014
- In office 24 December 2007 – 21 December 2011

Personal details
- Born: Viktor Vladislavovich Zubarev; 20 February 1961 Uzhur, Krasnoyarsk Krai, Russian SFSR, USSR
- Died: 31 May 2023 (aged 62) Moscow, Russia
- Party: United Russia
- Education: Krasnoyarsk State Technical University

Viktor Vladislavovich Zubarev (Russian: Виктор Владиславович Зубарев; 20 February 1961 – 31 May 2023) was a Russian politician who was a deputy of the 5th, 6th, 7th, and 8th State Dumas.

From 1984 to 1987, Zubarev worked as an engineer at the Institute of Chemistry and Chemical Technology of the Siberian Branch of the Academy of Sciences of the Soviet Union. From 1987 to 1990, he served as the chief engineer in the sector of modeling of mining processes at the Institute of Mining. At the end of the 1980s, he engaged in business. In 1996, he became the deputy of the Krasnoyarsk city council of Deputies. From 1997 to 2007, he was the deputy of the Legislative Assembly of Krasnoyarsk Krai. On 2 December 2007, Zubarev was elected deputy of the 5th State Duma. From 2011 to 2012, he was the deputy of the Legislative Assembly of Krasnoyarsk Krai. From 2012 to 2014, he was the deputy of the 6th State Duma; however, later, he resigned early. From 2016 to 2021, he was the deputy of the 7th State Duma. From September 2021, he served as deputy of the 8th State Duma.

== Sanctions ==
Zubarev was sanctioned by the United Kingdom government on 11 March 2022 in relation to the Russo-Ukrainian War.

== Death ==
Zubarev died on 31 May 2023, at the age of 62.

== See also ==
- List of members of the State Duma of Russia who died in office
