= Yury Shvytkin =

Russian politician (1965–2026)

- Юрий Швыткин
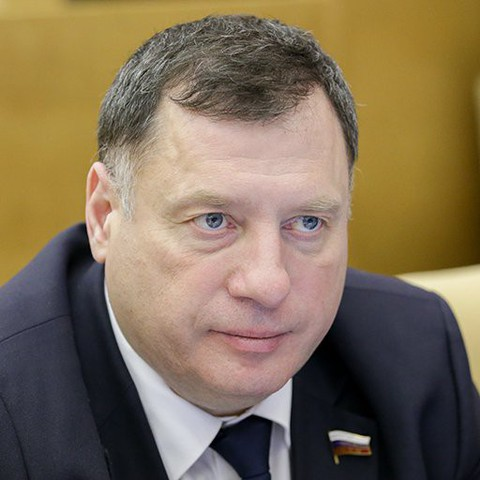
- Shvytkin in 2016

Member of the State Duma for Krasnoyarsk Krai
- In office 5 October 2016 – 23 March 2026
- Preceded by: constituency re-established
- Constituency: Krasnoyarsk (No. 54)

Personal details
- Born: 24 May 1965 Krasnoyarsk, Russian SFSR, Soviet Union
- Died: 23 March 2026 (aged 60)
- Party: United Russia
- Education: Novosibirsk Higher Military Command School

Military service
- Allegiance: (Soviet Union) USSR (Russia) Russian Federation
- Service: Airborne Forces; Ministry of Internal Affairs
- Service years: 1986–2001
- Rank: Colonel
- Conflict: First Chechen War

Yury Nikolaevich Shvytkin (Russian: Юрий Николаевич Швыткин; 24 May 1965 – 23 March 2026) was a Russian politician who was a deputy of the 7th and 8th State Dumas.

== Life and career ==
From 1986 to 1992, Shvytkin served at the 76th Guards Air Assault Division. From 1992 to 2001, he served at the Ministry of Internal Affairs of Krasnoyarsk Krai. From 2001 to 2016, he was the deputy of the Legislative Assembly of Krasnoyarsk Krai. In 2015, Shvytkin became a member of the All-Russia People's Front. In 2016 and 2021, he was elected deputy for the 7th, and 8th State Dumas.

Shvytkin was sanctioned by the UK government in 2022 in relation to the Russo-Ukrainian War. He died on 23 March 2026, at the age of 60.
