= Anatoly Bykov =

Russian businessman and politician (born 1960)

- Born: Anatoly Petrovich Bykov; 17 January 1960 (age 66); Elovka, Irkutsk Oblast, Russian SFSR, Soviet Union
- Education: Krasnoyarsk State Pedagogical University
- Occupations: Politician, businessman
- Political party: Patriots of Russia
- Board member of: Rusal (1995–2000)
- Spouse: Marina Bykova
- Children: 1
- Website: bykov.info

Anatoly Petrovich Bykov (Russian: Анатолий Петрович Быков; born 17 January 1960) is a Russian businessman, politician and a mafioso. During the 1990s, Bykov gained prominence in Krasnoyarsk Krai and Krasnoyarsk as an entrepreneur, who was the chairman of the board of the world's largest aluminium company RUSAL's Krasnoyarsk aluminum plant (KrAZ).

== Political activity ==
Bykov is considered one of the most powerful persons in Krasnoyarsk. Bykov from 1997 until 2016 held a seat as of the deputy of the Legislative Assembly of Krasnoyarsk Krai and his party Patriots of Russia is currently holding 14 (or 25.62%) of the 36 seats in the Krasnoyarsk City Council of Deputies, leaving Vladimir's Putin ruling party United Russia behind with 12 seats.

== Controversies ==
Bykov was a strong supporter of Alexander Lebed.

In 2002, Bykov received a suspended prison sentence of 6 1/2 years for plotting the murder of a former associate. The case was under review by the European Court of Human Rights in Strasbourg, following an application lodged by Bykov. In 2009, it ruled that Russian authorities violated the rights of Bykov and awarded him about $33,000 in compensation.

In May 2020, Bykov was arrested in Krasnoyarsk, on suspicion of organizing the 1994 murders of criminal gang members Kirill Voytenko and Alexander Naumov. In September 2021, he was sentenced to 13 years of imprisonment. In May 2023, a court in Krasnoyarsk handed down another sentence to Bykov. For inciting the murder of businessman Andrei Nekolov, he received 11 years. In December 2023, he received another 12 years for inciting the murder of crime boss Vladimir Filippov. The total term at that time was 20 years in a maximum security colony. The convicted person did not admit guilt.
