= Siberian State Aerospace University =

University in Krasnoyarsk, Russia

Coordinates: 56°00′42″N 92°58′25″E

Siberian State University of Science and Technology Reshetnev
- Университет Решетнёва
- Motto: Per aspera ad astra
- Type: Public
- Established: 1960
- Rector: Igor Vladimirovich Kovalyov
- Administrative staff: more than 1,600
- Students: 11 500
- Location: Office A-406, 31, Krasnoyarsky Rabochy Av., Krasnoyarsk, Krasnoyarsk Kray, Russia
- Website: sibsau.ru
- Building details
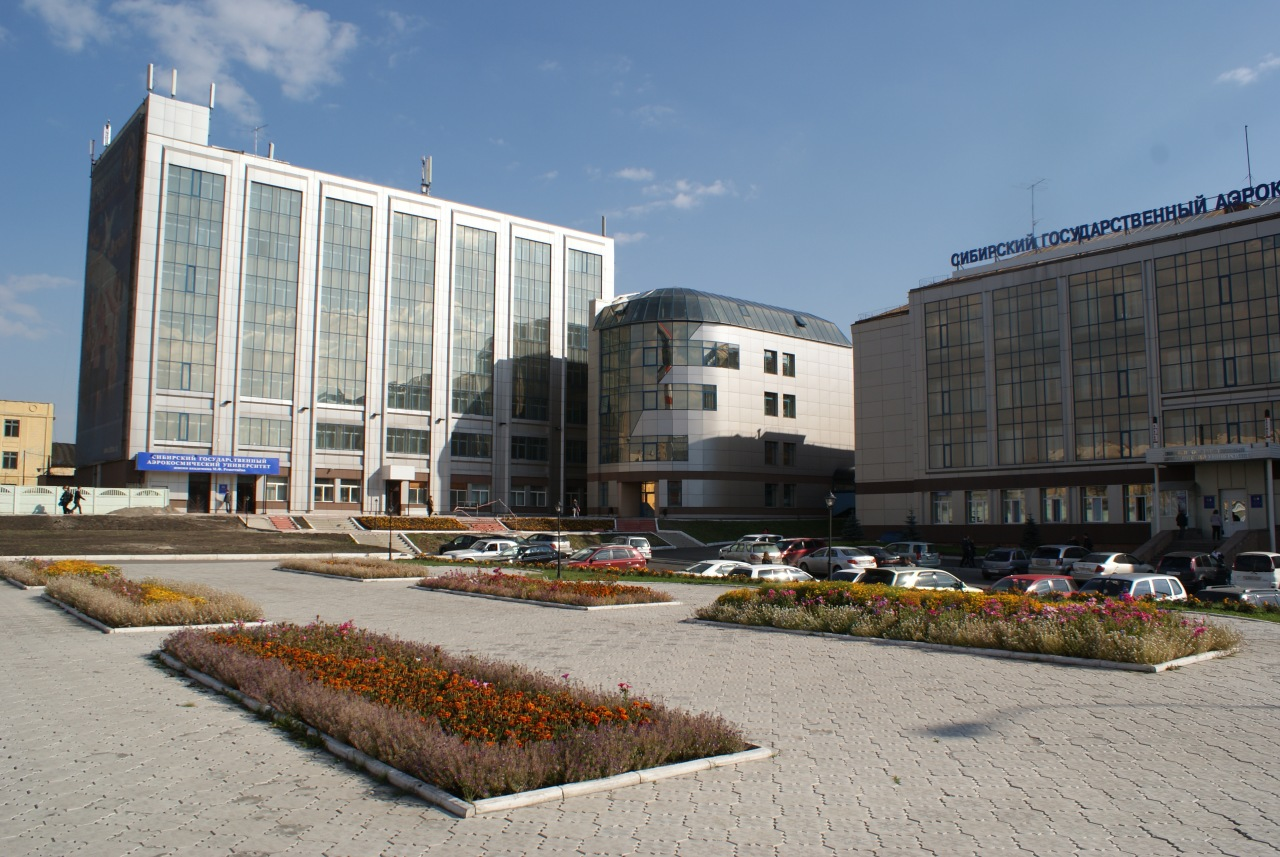

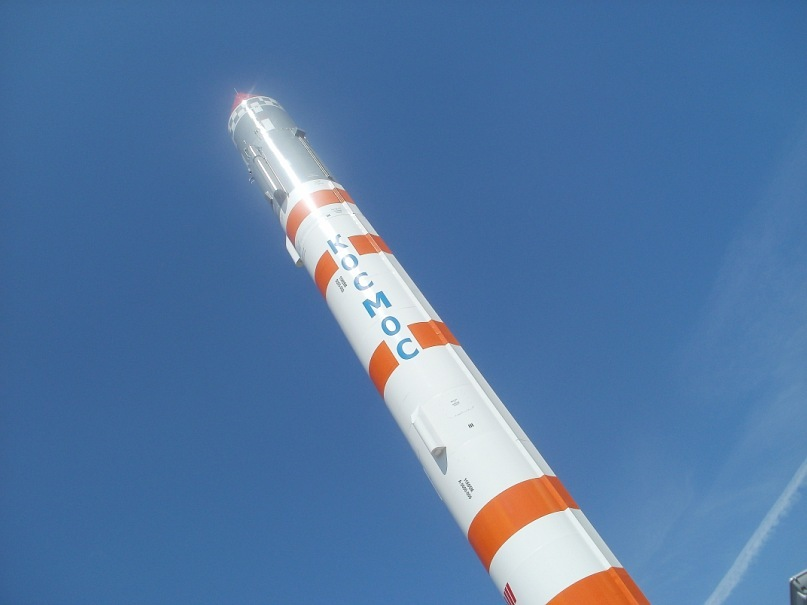
The model of rocket before university's building

The Siberian State University of Science and Technology (Russian: Сибирский государственный университет науки и технологий), previously known as Reshetnyov University, is a public university in Krasnoyarsk, Russian Federation. Founded in 1960.

== History ==
The university has carried different names: "Institute of the cosmic technology" (Красноярский институт космической техники, КИКТ) since 1989, and "Siberian aerospace academy" (Сибирская аэрокосмическая академия, САА) since 1992. In 1996, the academy was renamed after the member of the Academy Mikhail Fyodorovich Reshetnyov. In 2002, the academy got the status of a university.

The university has the license of the federal space agency. The university carries out basic research and works on its own research subjects with local and foreign enterprises. The basic partners for the university research activity are Krasmash (main manufacturer of the ballistic rockets for the submarines), informative satellite systems (main manufacturer and producer of the communications satellites, tele-broadcasting, navigation and geodesy) and KrasAir (an airline of Russia).

== Faculties ==
The Reshetnev University prepares professional forces for the cosmic branch, of the mechanical engineering, the EDP-professional forces, the economists, the experts, the professional forces in the area of public relations and of the advertisement, the management. The total number of the students in the Reshetnyov University is 11,500 people.

Faculties:

- Faculty the mechanical engineering and the mechatronik (Факультет машиноведения и мехатроники, ФММ)
- Faculty of the civil aviation fleet and the duty thing (Факультет гражданской авиации и таможенного дела, ФГАиТД)
- Faculty of the technology and the economy (Инженерно-экономический факультет, ИЭФ)
- Mind faculty (Гуманитарный факультет, ГФ)
- International college of the Businesses (Международная высшая школа бизнеса, МВШ)
- Faculty for the correspondence course and the continuing education (Факультет заочного и дополнительного образования)
- Faculty of the continuing education of the professional forces (Факультет повышения квалификации и переподготовки специалистов)
- Faculty of the sport (Факультет физической культуры и спорта)
- Faculty for the continuing education of the teachers (Факультет повышения квалификации преподавателей)

== See also ==
- List of institutions of higher learning in Russia
