= Edkham Akbulatov =

Russian politician (born 1960)

- Эдхам Акбулатов
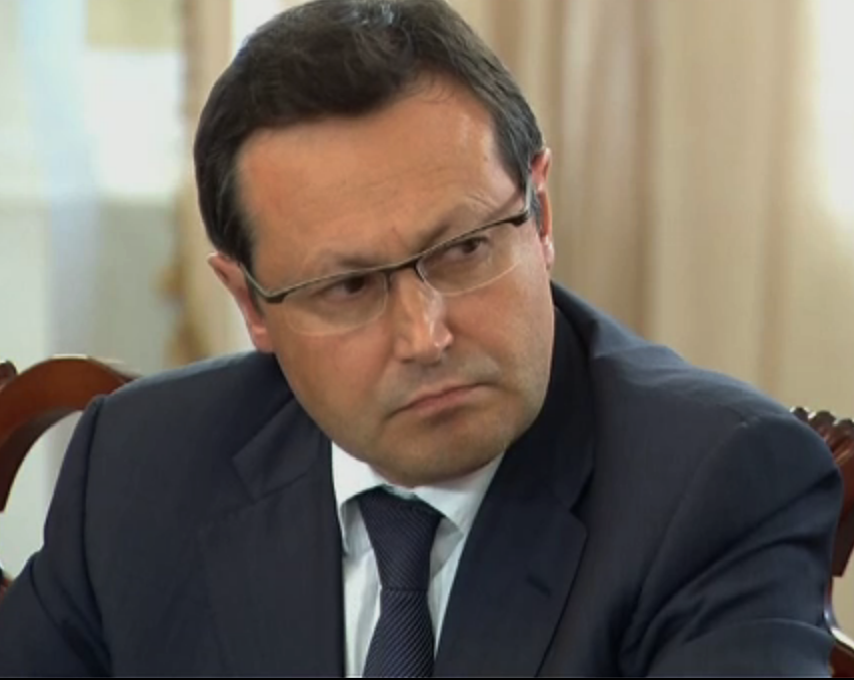
- Akbulatov in 2014

3rd mayor of Krasnoyarsk
- In office 19 June 2012 – 26 October 2017
- Preceded by: Pyotr Pimashkov
- Succeeded by: Sergey Yeryomin

Governor of Krasnoyarsk Krai (acting)
- In office 19 January 2010 – 15 February 2010
- Preceded by: Alexander Khloponin
- Succeeded by: Lev Luznetsov

2nd chairman of the Government of the Krasnoyarsk Krai
- In office 19 January 2010 – 15 February 2010
- Preceded by: Alexander Novak
- Succeeded by: Viktor Tomenko

Personal details
- Born: 18 June 1960 (age 66) Krasnoyarsk, RSFSR, Soviet Union (now Russia)
- Party: United Russia

Edkham Shukriyevich Akbulatov (Russian: Эдхам Шукриевич Акбулатов, IPA: [ɪˈtxam ʂʊˈkrʲijɪvʲɪtɕ ɐɡbʊˈlatəf]; Tatar: Әдһәм Шөкри улы Акбулатов, romanized: Ädhäm Şökri ulı Aqbulatov; born 18 June 1960) is a Russian politician who had been the mayor of Krasnoyarsk from 2012 to 2017.

From 19 January until 17 February 2010 he served as acting governor of Krasnoyarsk Krai after serving as first deputy governor to Alexander Khloponin and head of the government of Krasnoyarsk Krai (Russian: Председатель Правительства Красноярского края) in 2008-10, and deputy governor of Krasnoyarsk Krai and the chief of the Krai Economy and Planning Department in 2002-2008.
