= Divnogorsk =

Town in Krasnoyarsk Krai, Russia

Divnogorsk Дивногорск
- Town
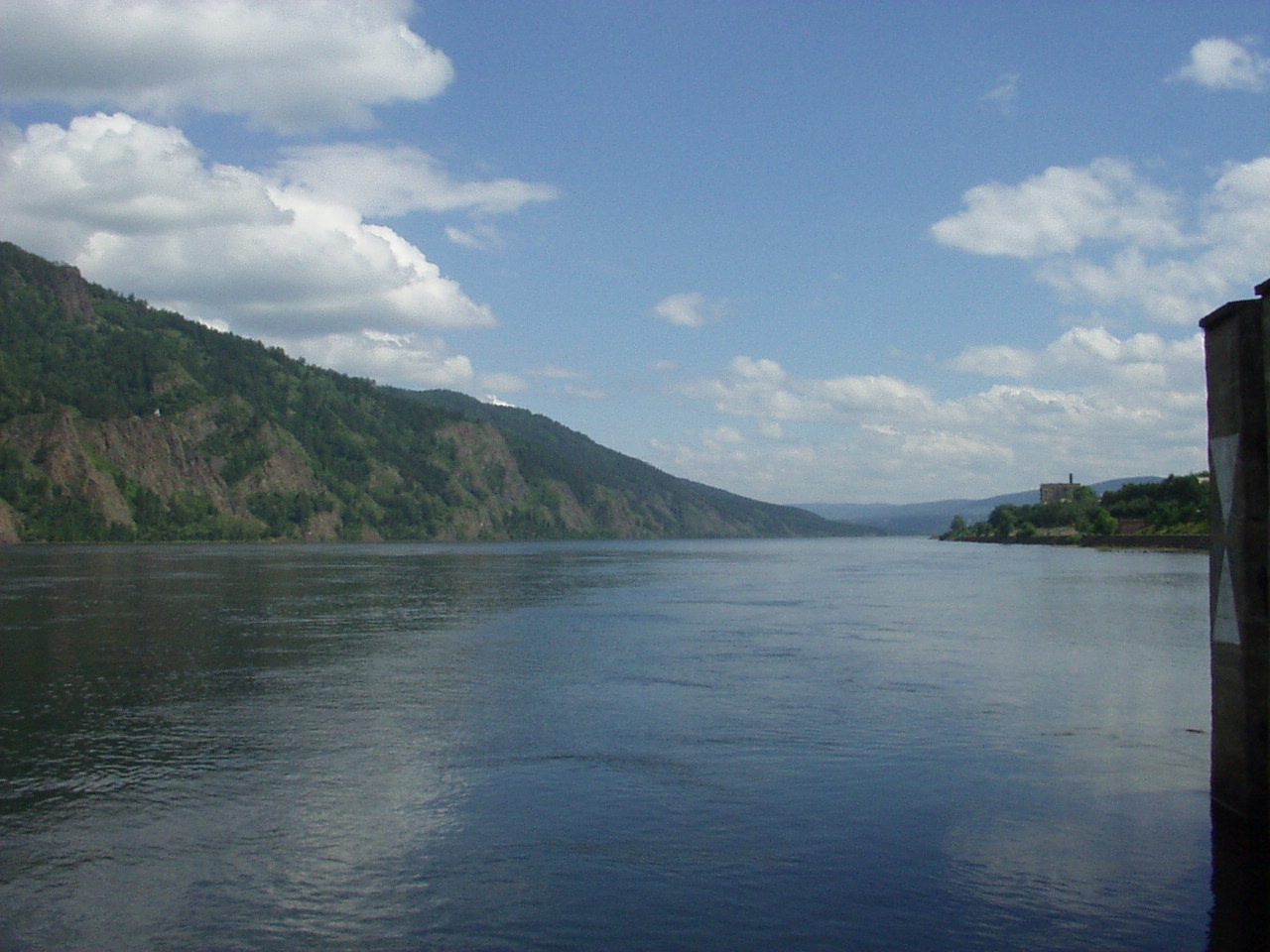
- The Yenisei River as seen from the Divnogorsk town pier

- Flag Coat of arms
- Interactive map of Divnogorsk
- Location of Divnogorsk Divnogorsk (Krasnoyarsk Krai)
- Coordinates: 55°57′34″N 92°21′43″E
- Country: Russia
- Federal subject: Krasnoyarsk Krai
- Founded: 1957
- Town status since: 1963
- Elevation: 260 m (850 ft)

Population (2010 Census)
  - Total: 28,272
  - Estimate (2021): 27,477 (−2.8%)

Administrative status
  - Subordinated to: krai town of Divnogorsk
  - Capital of: krai town of Divnogorsk

Municipal status
  - Urban okrug: Divnogorsk Urban Okrug
  - Capital of: Divnogorsk Urban Okrug
- Time zone: UTC+7 (MSK+4)
- Postal codes: 663090, 663091, 663093, 663094
- OKTMO ID: 04709000001
- Website: www.divnogorsk-adm.ru

Divnogorsk (Russian: Дивногорск, IPA: [dʲɪvnɐˈɡorsk]) is a town in Krasnoyarsk Krai, Russia, located on the Yenisei River, 20 kilometers (12 mi) west of Krasnoyarsk, the administrative center of the krai. Population: 28,272 (2010 census); 30,137 (2002 census); 29,963 (1989 Soviet census).

== History ==
Paleolithic remains, which was discovered on the western outskirts of the town, indicates that this land was inhabited by more than ten thousand years ago.

Where the town stands was the village Ovsyanka (Russian: с. Овсянка), founded in 1671.

In 1888 on the site of modern Divnogorsk celibate priest Filaret was founded Krasnoyarsk Znamensky obschezhitsky men's Skeet (closed in 1920); whose construction was begun on August 19 of that year. Over time, the monastery became a village Skeet. The monastery acted brick, smologonny, a candle factory, a variety of workshops. Skeet was the first above Krasnoyarsk pier for ships to stick to the sandy shore just below Filaretova stream. From the monastery buildings remained only a wooden two-storey house has been converted from an old church (now art studios are located here). In early 1920, monastery was closed and turned into a children's home, in 1921 transformed into a children's labor town number 2 for orphans. In 1930 in the village disbanded orphanage and experimental forestry and subsistence farming Krasnoyarsk Forestry College. At this time there were about a dozen families. Town status was granted to it in 1963.

== Administrative and municipal status ==
Within the framework of administrative divisions, it is, together with seven rural localities, incorporated as the krai town of Divnogorsk—an administrative unit with the status equal to that of the districts. As a municipal division, the krai town of Divnogorsk is incorporated as Divnogorsk Urban Okrug.

== Economy ==
Town's main industrial facility is the Krasnoyarsk Dam on the Yenisei River.

== Culture ==
2016 - Divnogorsk has become the Cultural capital of Krasnoyarsk Krai.
