= Governor of Krasnoyarsk Krai =

Highest-ranking official in Krasnoyarsk Krai, Russia

- Coat of Arms of Krasnoyarsk Krai

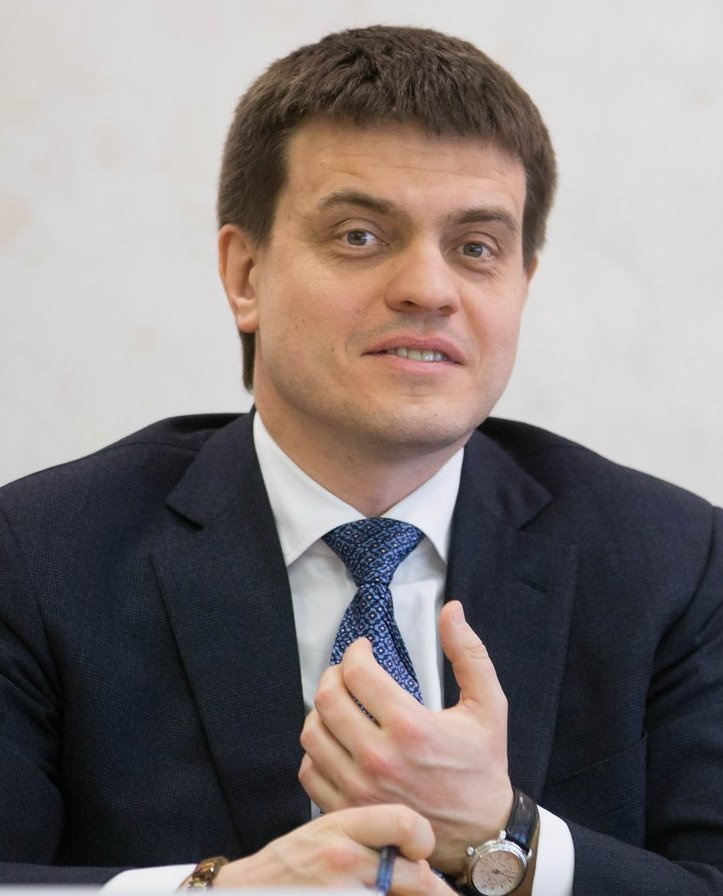
- Incumbent; Mikhail Kotyukov since 19 September 2023
- Residence: Krasnoyarsk
- Term length: 5 years
- Formation: 1991
- First holder: Arkady Veprev
- Website: krskstate.ru

The governor of Krasnoyarsk Krai (Russian: Губернатор Красноярского края) heads the executive branch in Krasnoyarsk Krai, a federal subject of Russia.

== History of office ==
On 29 December 1991 the president of Russia Boris Yeltsin appointed Arkady Veprev as the head of Krasnoyarsk Krai Administration. Veprev, a 64-year old former sovkhoz chairman, who was hostile to privatization, went on a conflict with local legislature and was forced to resign less than 13 months after his appointment. Veprev named economist Valery Zubov as his successor. In April 1993 Zubov was elected governor. Five years later, he lost to General Alexander Lebed, who received about 60% of the vote in the runoff.

After Lebed died in a helicopter crash in April 2002, the early election was set up for 8 September. Alexander Khloponin, governor of Taymyr, won that campaign. In 2007 he was reappointed by president Vladimir Putin as Krasnoyarsk Krai was reorganized by annexation of Taymyr and Evenk Autonomous Okrugs.

== List of officeholders ==
| No. | Portrait | Governor | Tenure | Time in office | Party | Election |
|---|---|---|---|---|---|---|
| 1 | | Arkady Veprev (1927–2006) | 31 December 1991 – 27 January 1993 (resigned) | 1 year, 27 days | Independent | Appointed |
| — | | Valery Zubov (1953–2016) | 27 January 1993 – 30 April 1993 | 5 years, 128 days | Independent | Acting |
| 2 | | Valery Zubov (1953–2016) | 30 April 1993 – 4 June 1998 (lost re-election) | 5 years, 128 days | Independent | 1993 |
| 3 | | Alexander Lebed (1950–2002) | 4 June 1998 – 28 April 2002 (died in office) | 3 years, 328 days | People's Republican Party | 1998 |
| — | | Nikolay Ashlapov (born 1962) | 28 April 2002 – 3 October 2002 (resigned) | 158 days | Independent | Acting |
| — | | Alexander Khloponin (born 1965) | 3 October 2002 – 17 October 2002 | 7 years, 108 days | United Russia | Acting |
| 4 | | Alexander Khloponin (born 1965) | 17 October 2002 – 19 January 2010 (resigned) | 7 years, 108 days | United Russia | 2002; 2007 |
| — | | Edkham Akbulatov (born 1960) | 19 January 2010 – 17 February 2010 | 29 days | United Russia | Acting |
| 5 | | Lev Kuznetsov (born 1965) | 17 February 2010 – 12 May 2014 (resigned) | 4 years, 84 days | United Russia | 2010 |
| — | | Viktor Tolokonsky (born 1953) | 12 May 2014 – 26 September 2014 | 3 years, 140 days | United Russia | Acting |
| 6 | | Viktor Tolokonsky (born 1953) | 26 September 2014 – 29 September 2017 (resigned) | 3 years, 140 days | United Russia | 2014 |
| — | | Aleksandr Uss (born 1954) | 29 September 2017 – 21 September 2018 | 5 years, 203 days | United Russia | Acting |
| 7 | | Aleksandr Uss (born 1954) | 21 September 2018 – 20 April 2023 (resigned) | 5 years, 203 days | United Russia | 2018 |
| — | | Mikhail Kotyukov (born 1976) | 20 April 2023 – 19 September 2023 | 3 years, 140 days | United Russia | Acting |
| 8 | | Mikhail Kotyukov (born 1976) | 19 September 2023 – present | 3 years, 140 days | United Russia | 2023 |
