= Russian Ecological Party "The Greens" =

Political party in Russia

Russian Ecological Party "The Greens" Российская экологическая партия «Зелёные»
- Abbreviation: REP "The Greens" (English); РЭП «Зелёные» (Russian)
- Leader: Andrey Nagibin, Alexandra Kudzagova, Sergey Shakhmatov, Rufina Shagapova
- Founders: Yevgeny Belyaev, Viktor Danilov-Danilyan
- Founded: September 7, 1992; 34 years ago (KEDR); June 19, 2002; 24 years ago (The Greens); February 11, 2012; 14 years ago (re-foundation)
- Registered: June 6, 2012; 14 years ago
- Merged into: A Just Russia (2008–2012)
- Headquarters: Luchnikov Lane 4/1, Moscow, Russia. 117630
- Youth wing: Young Greens
- Action wing: Green Patrol
- Membership (2008): 60,000
- Ideology: Green politics Agrarianism
- Political position: Centre
- Continental affiliation: Eurasian Association of Green Parties
- Colours: Green
- Slogan: "Мake Russia green together!" (Russian: "Сделаем Россию зелёной вместе!")
- State Duma: 0 / 450
- Seats in the Regional Parliaments: 4 / 3,994

Website
- greens.ru

The Russian Ecological Party "The Greens" (REP "The Greens"; Russian: Российская экологическая партия «Зелёные», romanized: Rossiyskaya ekologicheskaya partija «Zelyonyye») is a green political party in the Russian Federation. It was founded in 1992 as the Constructive-Ecological Movement of Russia "Kedr" (KEDR; Russian: Конструктивно-экологическое движение России «Кедр», romanized: Konstruktivno-ekologicheskoye dvizheniye Rossii «Kedr»). In 2002 the party was transformed into the Russian Ecological Party "The Greens". The party endorsed Vladimir Putin in the 2018 Russian presidential election.

== History ==
Former version of the logo

In the 2007 Russian regional elections "The Greens" gained 7.58% of the votes in the Samara Oblast, gaining deputies in the Samara Regional Duma.

Before the 2007 parliamentary elections, the Russian Central Electoral Commission decided that the Russian Ecological Party "The Greens" would not be able to stand, due to an alleged large number of fake signatures (17%, more than the allowed 5%) in their supporters' lists.

In 2008 the XV congress of the party decided to transform the party into the social movement Russian Ecological Movement "Greens" (Российское экологическое движение «Зеленые»). It advised all members and supporters of the party to join A Just Russia.

In 2012 the members met and decided to register as a party and not as a social movement. The decision was carried out successfully and the party registered itself.

The party endorsed Putin in the 2018 Russian presidential election.

On April 26, 2026, the party announced the unification of the Green Party and Green Alternative with the retention of the Green Party's name and imagery. As a symbolic gesture, Green Alternative leader Ruslan Khvostov gave Alexandra Kudzagova a red cat, the symbol of Green Alternative.

== Change of leadership ==
On May 15, 2021, an extraordinary party congress was held at the President Hotel in Moscow, which was attended by more than 80 delegates from 53 regions. Members previously expelled from the party before the congress were reinstated. The congress elected Andrey Nagibin as the new chairman and leader of the Russian Ecological Party "The Greens", director of the All-Russian Green Patrol movement, replacing Anatoly Panfilov in this post. The congress also elected co-chairs of the party of pilot-cosmonaut Sergey Revin, chairman of the council of the Bashkortostan regional branch, Deputy of the State Assembly – Kurultai of the Republic of Bashkortostan Rufina Shagapova, chairman of the Council of the regional branch of the Krasnoyarsk Krai, member of the Krasnoyarsk City Council of Deputies Sergey Shakhmatov and director of the Federal State Budgetary Institution "Kronotsky State Reserve" Peter Shpilenok. The congress adopted a new edition of the Party Charter.

On April 29, 2021, the official website of "The Greens" party published a statement of its chairman Panfilov A. saying that a group of people headed by some A. Komarov on instructions of the state authorities conspired to seize the party with the aim of preventing it from participating in the 2021 Duma elections.

On May 12, 2021, the Central Council expelled from the party former deputy Minister of Resources of Krasnoyarsk Krai Shakhmatov S. for participation in raider seizure of the party.

A group of people involved in the takeover of the party sent out a press release to mass media saying that on May 15 in "President-hotel" an illegitimate congress of the party took place; there it was decided to overthrow the former leadership and to change the charter which made it impossible for the party to participate in elections to the State Duma on September 19, 2021, because the charter has to be presented not later than one year before the elections.

The "legitimate" congress of the party was set to take place on May 21–22, 2021, at the Cosmos Hotel.

The Ministry of Justice of Russian Federation recognized the decision of the extraordinary congress of May 15, 2021, as legitimate, and a record of the change of leadership and legal address was made in the Unified State Register of Legal Entities.

On October 28, 2023, an extraordinary congress of the Green Party took place. As a result, Andrei Nagibin retained the post of Chairman of the party. The co-chairs of the party were the chairman of the council of the Bashkortostan regional branch, Deputy of the State Assembly – Kurultai of the Bashkortostan Republic Rufina Shagapova, the chairman of the council of the regional branch of the Krasnoyarsk Krai Sergei Shakhmatov, the chairman of the council of the Moscow regional branch Alexandra Kudzagova.

== Electoral results ==
=== Presidential elections ===
Election	Candidate	First round		Second round		Result
Election	Candidate	Votes	%	Votes	%	Result
2008	Endorsed Dmitry Medvedev	52,530,712	70.28%			Elected ✓
2012	Party was part of A Just Russia and did not participate in the elections					
2018	Endorsed Vladimir Putin	56,430,712	76.69%			Elected ✓
2024	Endorsed Vladimir Putin	76,277,708	82.28%			Elected ✓

=== Legislative elections ===
Election	Party leader	Performance					Rank	Government
Election	Party leader	Votes	%	± pp	Seats	+/–	Rank	Government
1993	Anatoly Panfilov	406,789	0.76%	New	1 / 450	New	12th	Government
1995	Anatoly Panfilov	962,195	1.39%	▲0.63	0 / 450	▼0	▼25th	Extra-parliamentary
1999	Anatoly Panfilov	Only constituencies			0 / 450	0	▼28th	Extra-parliamentary
2003	Anatoly Panfilov	253,985	0.41%	▼0.98	0 / 450	0	▲14th	Extra-parliamentary
2007	Anatoly Panfilov	Party was part of A Just Russia and did not participate in the elections						Extra-parliamentary
2011	Anatoly Panfilov	Party was part of A Just Russia and did not participate in the elections						Extra-parliamentary
2016	Oleg Mitvol	399,429	0.77%	▲0.77	0 / 450	0	▲10th	Extra-parliamentary
2021	Andrey Nagibin	512,420	0.91%	▲0.14	0 / 450	0	▲9th	Extra-parliamentary
2026	Andrey Nagibin; Alexandra Kudzagova; Sergey Shakhmatov; Rufina Shagapova	761,542	1.15%	▲0.24	0 / 450	0	▲7th	Extra-parliamentary

== See also ==
- Green party
- Green politics
- List of environmental organizations
