= Legislative Assembly of Krasnoyarsk Krai =

Regional parliament of Krasnoyarsk Krai, Russia

Legislative Assembly of Krasnoyarsk Krai Законодательное собрание Красноярского края

Type
- Type: Unicameral

Leadership
- Chairman: Aleksey Dodatko, United Russia since 12 October 2021

Structure
- Seats: 52
- Political groups: United Russia (34) CPRF (8); LDPR (4); New People (2); SRZP (1); Greens (1) Independent (2)

Elections
- Voting system: Mixed
- Last election: 19 September 2021
- Next election: 2026

Meeting place
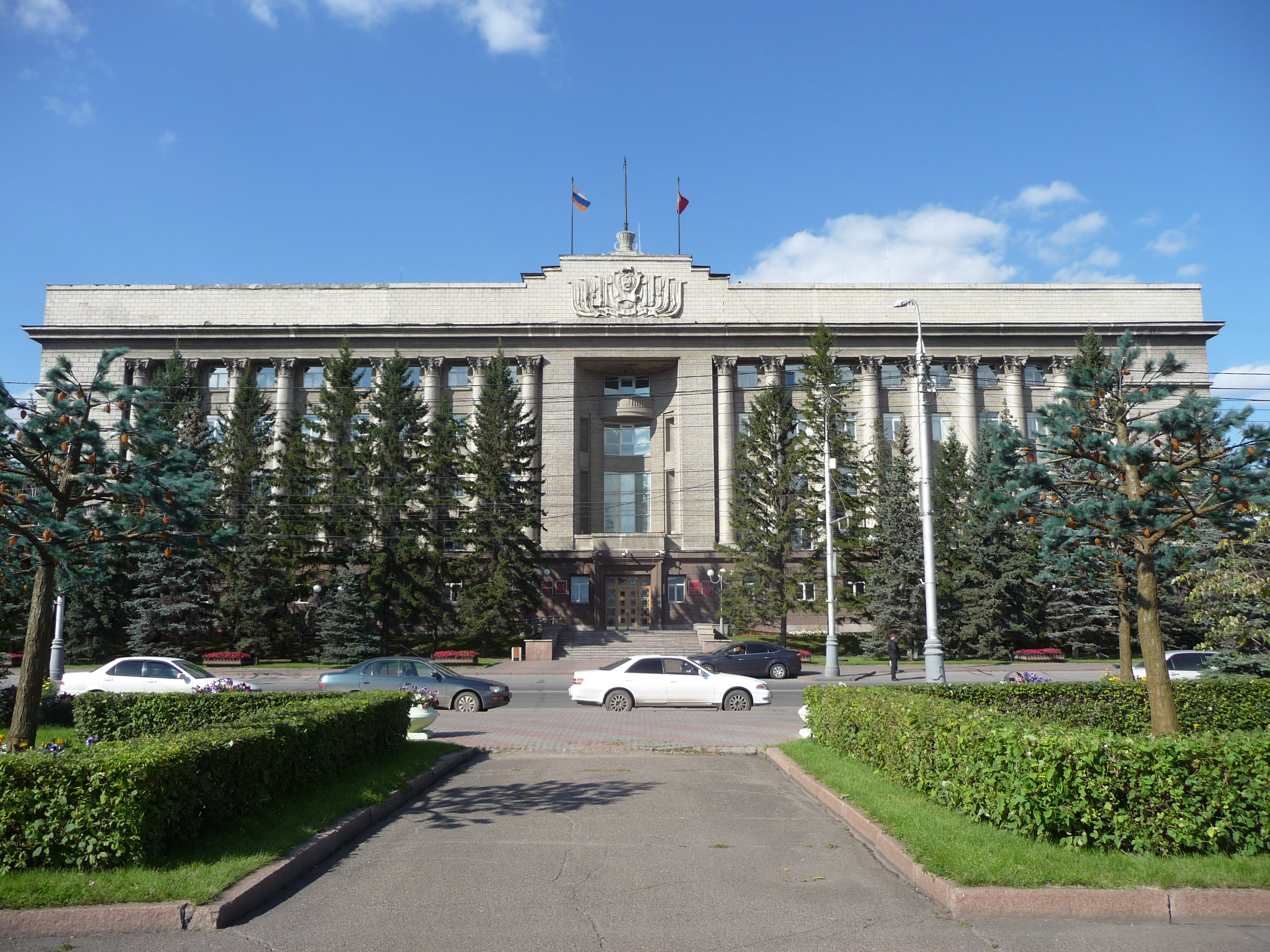
- 10 Prospekt Mira, Krasnoyarsk

Website
- www.sobranie.info

The Legislative Assembly of Krasnoyarsk Krai (Russian: Законодательное собрание Красноярского края, romanized: Zakonodatel'noye sobraniye Krasnoyarskogo kraya) is the regional parliament of Krasnoyarsk Krai, a federal subject of Russia. It consists of 52 deputies elected for five-year terms.

== Elections ==
=== 2021 ===
Party	%	Seats
United Russia	31.68	34
Communist Party of the Russian Federation	21.79	8
Liberal Democratic Party of Russia	14.67	4
New People	7.96	2
A Just Russia — For Truth	7.10	1
The Greens	5.11	1
Self-nominated	—	2
Russian Party of Pensioners for Social Justice	4.36	0
Communists of Russia	2.69	0
Rodina	1.29	0
Registered voters/turnout	40.79	
