= Flag of Krasnoyarsk Krai =

Flag of the Russian krai of Krasnoyarsk

Krasnoyarsk Krai
- Proportion: 2:3
- Adopted: 16 March 2000
- Design: Red field with the coat of arms of the krai
- Designed by: V. Grigoriev

The flag of Krasnoyarsk Krai, in the Russian Federation, is a red field charged with the krai's coat of arms in the center. Two fifths of the flag's height, it displays a golden lion holding a sickle in its left hand and a shovel in its right hand. The lion is surrounded by a golden wreath of cedar and oak leaves as well as a light blue ribbon on the left, right, and bottom sides. A golden pedestal encloses the lion at the top. The flag was adopted on 16 March 2000.

== Other flags ==
=== Administrative divisions ===
Flag	Date	Use	Description
	?–Present	Flag of Krasnoyarsk city	
	2002–Present	Flag of Zheleznogorsk	A red background with a yellow bear splitting an atom.
	?–2002	Flag of Zheleznogorsk	
	?–Present	Flag of Zelenogorsk	
	?–Present	Flag of Solnechny	
	?–Present	Flag of Bogotol	
	?–Present	Flag of Borodino	
	?–Present	Flag of Divnogorsk	
	?–Present	Flag of Yeniseysk	
	?–Present	Flag of Kansk	
	?–Present	Flag of Lesosibirsk	
	2020–Present	Flag of Minusinsk	
	2001–2020	Flag of Minusinsk	Red background with the coat of arms on the top left.
	1997–2001	Flag of Minusinsk	Same flag as above but 1:2 ratio.
	?–Present	Flag of Nazarovo	
	?–Present	Flag of Norilsk	
	?–Present	Flag of Sosnovoborsk	
	2004–Present	Flag of Sharypovo	
	?–2004	Flag of Sharypovo	
	?–Present	Flag of Abansky District	
	?–Present	Flag of Achinsky District	
	?–Present	Flag of Balakhtinsky District	
	?–Present	Flag of Beryozovsky District	
	?–Present	Flag of Birilyussky District	
	?–Present	Flag of Bogotolsky District	
	?–Present	Flag of Boguchansky District	
	?–Present	Flag of Bolshemurtinsky District	
	2012–Present	Flag of Dzerzhinsky District	
	?–2012	Flag of Dzerzhinsky District	
	?–Present	Flag of Yemelyanovsky District	
	?–Present	Flag of Kedrovy	
	?–Present	Flag of Yeniseysky District	
	?–Present	Flag of Yermakovsky District	
	?–Present	Flag of Idrinsky District	
	2010–Present	Flag of Ilansky District	
	?–2010	Flag of Ilansky District	
	?–Present	Flag of Irbeysky District	
	?–Present	Flag of Kazachinsky District	
	?–Present	Flag of Kansky District	
	?–Present	Flag of Karatuzsky District	
	?–Present	Flag of Kezhemsky District	
	?–Present	Flag of Kozulsky District	
	?–Present	Flag of Krasnoturansky District	
	?–Present	Flag of Kuraginsky District	
	?–Present	Flag of Mansky District	
	?–Present	Flag of Minusinsky District	
	?–Present	Flag of Motyginsky District	
	?–Present	Flag of Nazarovsky District	
	?–Present	Flag of Nizhneingashsky District	
	?–Present	Flag of Novosyolovsky District	
	?–Present	Flag of Partizansky District	
	?–Present	Flag of Pirovsky District	
	?–Present	Flag of Rybinsky District,	
	?–?	Flag of Rybinsky District,	Red background with the coat of arms on the middle.
	?–Present	Flag of Sayansky District	
	2011–Present	Flag of Severo-Yeniseysky District	
	2002–2011	Flag of Severo-Yeniseysky District	
	2006–Present	Flag of the Evenkiysky District	
	?–Present	Flag of Sukhobuzimsky District	
	?–Present	Flag of Taseyevsky District	
	2007–Present	Flag of the Taymyrsky Dolgano-Nenetsky District	
	?–Present	Flag of Turukhansky District	
	?–Present	Flag of Tyukhtetsky District	
	?–Present	Flag of Uzhursky District	
	?–Present	Flag of Uyarsky District	
	?–Present	Flag of Sharypovsky District	
	?–Present	Flag of Shushensky District	

=== Settlements ===
Flag	Date	Use	Description
	?–Present	Flag of Achinsk	
	?–Present	Flag of Beryozovka	
	?–Present	Flag of Boguchany	
	?–Present	Flag of Dzerzhinskoye	
	?–Present	Flag of Idrinskoye	
	?–Present	Flag of Ilansky	
	?–Present	Flag of Karatuzskoye	
	?–Present	Flag of Kodinsk	
	?–Present	Flag of Kuragino	
	?–Present	Flag of Pirovskoye	
	?–Present	Flag of Zaozyorny	
	?–Present	Flag of Severo-Yeniseysky	
	?–Present	Flag of Dudinka	
	?–Present	Flag of Tura	
	?–Present	Flag of Turukhansk	
	?–Present	Flag of Uzhur	
	?–Present	Flag of Uyar	
	?–Present	Flag of Shushenskoye	
	?–Present	Flag of Igarka	
