= Administrative divisions of Krasnoyarsk Krai =

Krasnoyarsk Krai Russia
- Administrative center: Krasnoyarsk

Administrative structure (as of 2015)
- Districts: 44
- Cities/towns: 22
- Urban-type settlements: 37
- Selsovets: 463

Municipal structure (as of 2002)
- Rural settlements: 1,596 (inhabited); 26 (uninhabited)

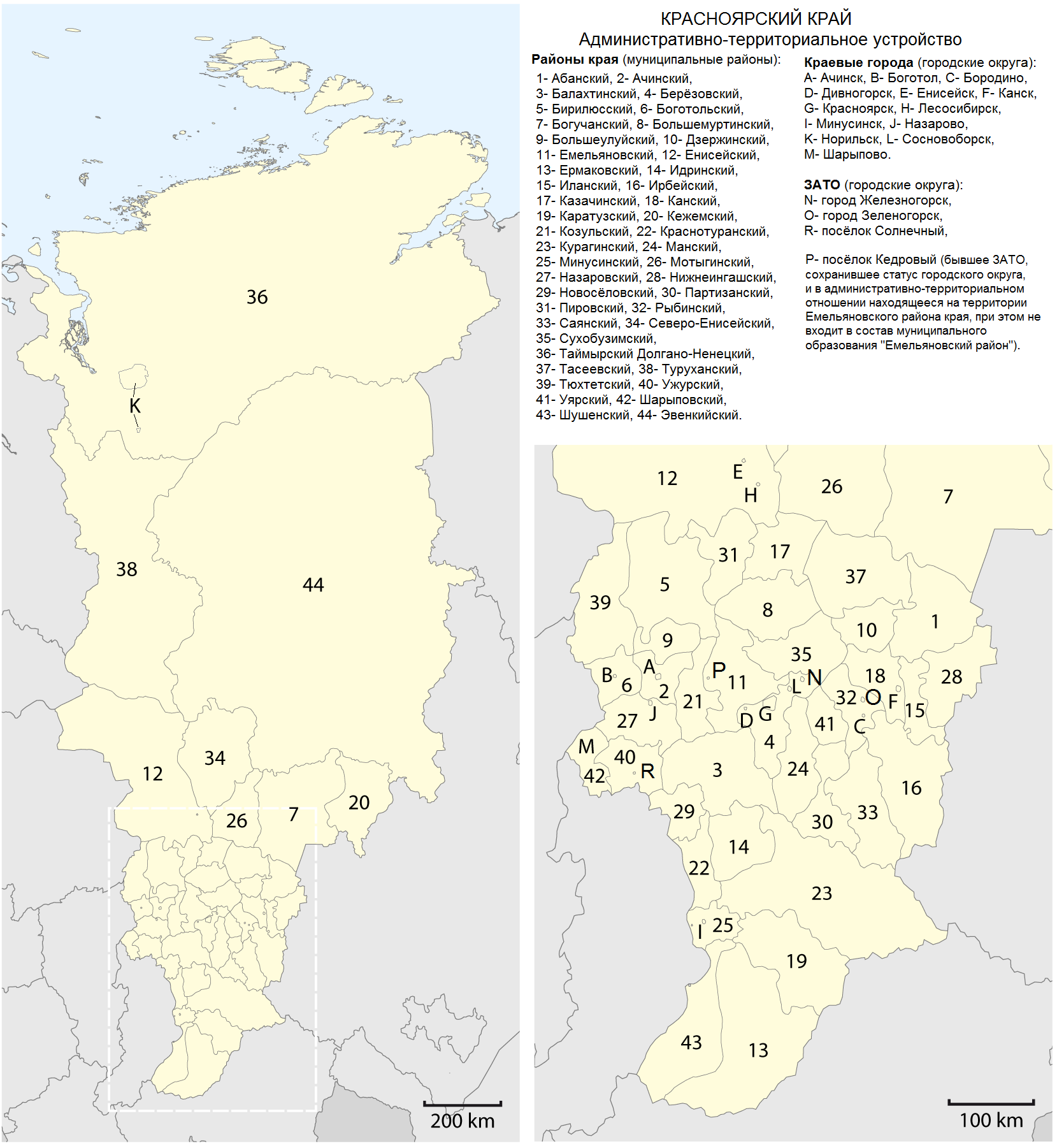
Map of Krasnoyarsk Krai (southern part of the krai shown enlargened)

Krasnoyarsk Krai is a federal subject of Russia.

== Administrative and municipal divisions ==
Map

Division		Structure		OKATO	OKTMO	Urban-type settlement/ district-level town*	Rural (selsovet)
Division		Administrative	Municipal	OKATO	OKTMO	Urban-type settlement/ district-level town*	Rural (selsovet)
Zheleznogorsk (Железногорск)		city (ZATO)	urban okrug	04 535	04 735	Podgorny (Подгорный)	
Zelenogorsk (Зеленогорск)		city (ZATO)	urban okrug	04 537	04 737		
Solnechny (Солнечный)		urban-type settlement (ZATO)	urban okrug	04 580	04 780		
Krasnoyarsk (Красноярск)		city	urban okrug	04 401	04 701		
↳	Kirovsky (Кировский)	(under Krasnoyarsk)	—N/a	04 401	—N/a		
↳	Leninsky (Ленинский)	(under Krasnoyarsk)	—N/a	04 401	—N/a		
↳	Oktyabrsky (Октябрьский)	(under Krasnoyarsk)	—N/a	04 401	—N/a		
↳	Sovetsky (Советский)	(under Krasnoyarsk)	—N/a	04 401	—N/a		
↳	Sverdlovsky (Свердловский)	(under Krasnoyarsk)	—N/a	04 401	—N/a		
↳	Tsentralny (Центральный)	(under Krasnoyarsk)	—N/a	04 401	—N/a		
↳	Zheleznodorozhny (Железнодорожный)	(under Krasnoyarsk)	—N/a	04 401	—N/a		
Achinsk (Ачинск)		city	urban okrug	04 403	04 703		
Bogotol (Боготол)		city	urban okrug	04 406	04 706		
Borodino (Бородино)		city	urban okrug	04 407	04 707		
Divnogorsk (Дивногорск)		city	urban okrug	04 409	04 709		
Yeniseysk (Енисейск)		city	urban okrug	04 412	04 712		
Kansk (Канск)		city	urban okrug	04 420	04 720		
Lesosibirsk (Лесосибирск)		city	urban okrug	04 422	04 722	Strelka (Стрелка)	
Minusinsk (Минусинск)		city	urban okrug	04 423	04 723	Zelyony Bor (Зелёный Бор)	
Nazarovo (Назарово)		city	urban okrug	04 426	04 726		
Norilsk (Норильск)		city	Norilsk Urban District	04 429	04 729	Snezhnogorsk (Снежногорск)	
↳	Kayerkan (Кайеркан)	(under Norilsk)	—N/a	04 429	—N/a		
↳	Talnakh (Талнах)	(under Norilsk)	—N/a	04 429	—N/a		
↳	Tsentralny (Центральный)	(under Norilsk)	—N/a	04 429	—N/a		
Sosnovoborsk (Сосновоборск)		city	urban okrug	04 433	04 733		
Sharypovo (Шарыпово)		city	urban okrug	04 440	04 740	Dubinino (Дубинино); Goryachegorsk (Горячегорск)	
Abansky (Абанский)		district		04 201	04 601		16
Achinsky (Ачинский)		district		04 203	04 603		9
Balakhtinsky (Балахтинский)		district		04 204	04 604	Balakhta (Балахта)	12
Beryozovsky (Берёзовский)		district		04 205	04 605	Beryozovka (Берёзовка)	5
Birilyussky (Бирилюсский)		district		04 206	04 606	Rassvet (Рассвет)	10
Bogotolsky (Боготольский)		district		04 208	04 608		8
Boguchansky (Богучанский)		district		04 209	04 609		18
Bolshemurtinsky (Большемуртинский)		district		04 210	04 610	Bolshaya Murta (Большая Мурта); Predivinsk (Предивинск)	10
Bolsheuluysky (Большеулуйский)		district		04 211	04 611		9
Dzerzhinsky (Дзержинский)		district		04 213	04 613		8
Yemelyanovsky (Емельяновский)		district		04 214	04 614	Pamyati 13 Bortsov (Памяти 13 Борцов); Yemelyanovo (Емельяново)	12
Kedrovy (Кедровый)		(under Yemelyanovsky)	urban okrug	04 214	04 775		
Yeniseysky (Енисейский)		district		04 215	04 615	Podtyosovo (Подтёсово)	25
Yermakovsky (Ермаковский)		district		04 216	04 616		14
Idrinsky (Идринский)		district		04 217	04 617		16
Ilansky (Иланский)		district		04 218	04 618	Ilansky (Иланский) town*	9
Irbeysky (Ирбейский)		district		04 219	04 619		18
Kazachinsky (Казачинский)		district		04 220	04 620		14
Kansky (Канский)		district		04 221	04 621		15
Karatuzsky (Каратузский)		district		04 222	04 622		14
Kezhemsky (Кежемский)		district		04 224	04 624	Kodinsk (Кодинск) town*	7
Kozulsky (Козульский)		district		04 226	04 626	Kozulka (Козулька); Novochernorechensky (Новочернореченский)	5
Krasnoturansky (Краснотуранский)		district		04 228	04 628		9
Kuraginsky (Курагинский)		district		04 230	04 630	Artyomovsk (Артёмовск) town*; Bolshaya Irba (Большая Ирба); Chibizhek (Чибижек); Koshurnikovo (Кошурниково); Krasnokamensk (Краснокаменск); Kuragino (Курагино)	16
Mansky (Манский)		district		04 231	04 631		11
Minusinsky (Минусинский)		district		04 233	04 633		13
Motyginsky (Мотыгинский)		district		04 235	04 635	Motygino (Мотыгино); Razdolinsk (Раздолинск); Yuzhno-Yeniseysky (Южно-Енисейский)	8
Nazarovsky (Назаровский)		district		04 237	04 637		10
Nizhneingashsky (Нижнеингашский)		district		04 239	04 639	Nizhny Ingash (Нижний Ингаш); Nizhnyaya Poyma (Нижняя Пойма); Pokanayevka (Поканаевка); Tinskoy (Тинской)	12
Novosyolovsky (Новосёловский)		district		04 241	04 641		8
Partizansky (Партизанский)		district		04 243	04 643		9
Pirovsky (Пировский)		district	okrug	04 245	04 645		10
Rybinsky (Рыбинский)		district		04 247	04 647	Zaozyorny (Заозёрный) town*; Irsha (Ирша); Sayansky (Саянский); Ural (Урал)	13
Sayansky (Саянский)		district		04 248	04 648		14
Severo-Yeniseysky (Северо-Енисейский)		district		04 249	04 649	Severo-Yeniseysky (Северо-Енисейский); Teya (Тея)	
Evenkiysky (Эвенкийский)		special district	district	04 250	04 650		
Sukhobuzimsky (Сухобузимский)		district		04 251	04 651		9
Taseyevsky (Тасеевский)		district		04 252	04 652		8
Taymyrsky Dolgano-Nenetsky (Таймырский Долгано-Ненецкий)		special district	district	04 253	04 653	Dudinka (Дудинка) town*	
Turukhansky (Туруханский)		district		04 254	04 654	Igarka (Игарка) town*; Svetlogorsk (Светлогорск)	5
Tyukhtetsky (Тюхтетский)		district	okrug	04 255	04 655		10
Uzhursky (Ужурский)		district		04 256	04 656	Uzhur (Ужур) town*	12
Uyarsky (Уярский)		district		04 257	04 657	Uyar (Уяр) town*	9
Sharypovsky (Шарыповский)		district	okrug	04 258	04 658		7
Shushensky (Шушенский)		district		04 259	04 659	Shushenskoye (Шушенское)	7

== See also ==
- Administrative divisions of Evenk Autonomous Okrug
- Administrative divisions of Taymyr Autonomous Okrug
