= IRBA =

IRBA or Irba may refer to:

- Independent Regulatory Board for Auditors, in the Republic of South Africa
- Institut de recherche biomédicale des armées, the Biomedical research institute of the Armies, part of the French Armed Forces Health Service
- Irba, a census town in India

== See also ==
- Bolshaya Irba
- Irbe
