= Sharypovo Airport =

Airport in Russia

Sharypovo
- IATA: none; ICAO: UNKO

Summary
- Airport type: Public
- Location: Sharypovo, Krasnoyarsk Krai
- Elevation AMSL: 1,099 ft / 335 m
- Coordinates: 55°27′18″N 089°10′30″E
- Interactive map of Sharypovo

Runways
Direction	Length		Surface
Direction	ft	m	Surface
02/20	5,413	1,650	Concrete

Sharypovo Airport (ICAO: UNKO) is an airport in Krasnoyarsk Krai, Russia located 9 km south of Sharypovo, Krasnoyarsk Krai. It services small transport planes.
