= Kholmogorsky =

Kholmogorsky (masculine), Kholmogorskaya (feminine), or Kholmogorskoye (neuter) may refer to:

- Kholmogorsky District, a district of Arkhangelsk Oblast, Russia
- Kholmogorskaya, a rural locality (a settlement) in Plesetsky District of Arkhangelsk Oblast, Russia
- Kholmogorskoye, a rural locality (a selo) in Sharypovsky District of Krasnoyarsk Krai, Russia
