= Koshurnikovo =

Koshurnikovo Кошурниково
- Urban-type settlement
- Interactive map of Koshurnikovo
- Location of Koshurnikovo Koshurnikovo (Krasnoyarsk Krai)
- Coordinates: 54.3003°N 93.3958°E
- Country: Russia
- Federal subject: Krasnoyarsk Krai
- Administrative district: Kuraginsky District
- Founded: 1958

Population (2010 Census)
  - Total: 3,492
  - Estimate (2025): 2,627 (−24.8%)
- Time zone: UTC+7 (MSK+4)
- Postal code: 662950
- OKTMO ID: 04630153051

Koshurnikovo (Russian: Кошу́рниково) is an urban locality (an urban-type settlement) in Kuraginsky District of Krasnoyarsk Krai, Russia. Population: 3,492 (2010 census); 3,802 (2002 census); 5,163 (1989 Soviet census).
