= Irsha =

Irsha Ирша
- Urban-type settlement
- Interactive map of Irsha
- Location of Irsha Irsha (Krasnoyarsk Krai)
- Coordinates: 55.9313°N 94.8006°E
- Country: Russia
- Federal subject: Krasnoyarsk Krai
- Administrative district: Rybinsky District

Population (2010 Census)
  - Total: 1,236
  - Estimate (2025): 924 (−25.2%)
- Time zone: UTC+7 (MSK+4)
- Postal code: 663974
- OKTMO ID: 04647155051

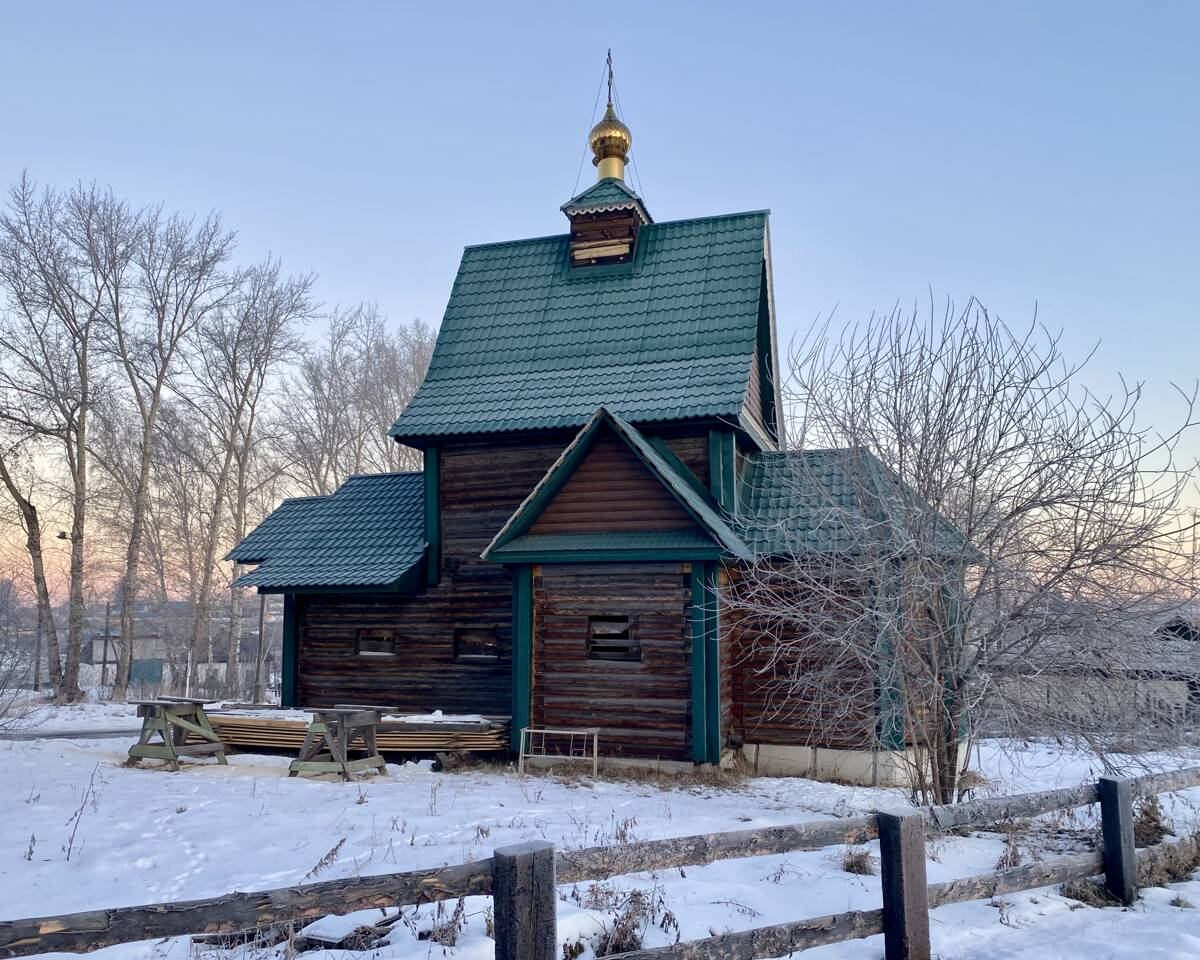
Church of the Sovereign Icon of the Mother of God

Irsha (Russian: И́рша) is an urban locality (an urban-type settlement) in Rybinsky District of Krasnoyarsk Krai, Russia. Population: 1,236 (2010 census); 1,459 (2002 census); 1,837 (1989 Soviet census).
