= Artyomovsk, Russia =

Town in Krasnoyarsk Krai, Russia

Artyomovsk Артёмовск
- Town
- Interactive map of Artyomovsk
- Location of Artyomovsk Artyomovsk (Krasnoyarsk Krai)
- Coordinates: 54°20′54″N 93°26′08″E
- Country: Russia
- Federal subject: Krasnoyarsk Krai
- Administrative district: Kuraginsky District
- District townSelsoviet: Artyomovsk
- Founded: 1860
- Elevation: 470 m (1,540 ft)

Population (2010 Census)
  - Total: 2,179
  - Estimate (2025): 1,344 (−38.3%)

Administrative status
  - Capital of: District town of Artyomovsk

Municipal status
  - Municipal district: Kuraginsky Municipal District
  - Urban settlement: Artyomovsk Urban Settlement
  - Capital of: Artyomovsk Urban Settlement
- Time zone: UTC+7 (MSK+4)
- Postal code: 662951
- OKTMO ID: 04630102001

Artyomovsk (Russian: Артёмовск) is a town in Kuraginsky District of Krasnoyarsk Krai, Russia, located 180 kilometers (110 mi) south of Krasnoyarsk. Population: 2,179 (2010 census); 2,929 (2002 census); 4,521 (1989 Soviet census).

== History ==
It was founded in 1860 as a mining settlement of Olkhovsky (Ольховский). It was granted town status in 1939.

== Administrative and municipal status ==
Within the framework of administrative divisions, it is, together with the settlement of Dzheb, incorporated within Kuraginsky District as the district town of Artyomovsk. As a municipal division, the district town of Artyomovsk is incorporated within Kuraginsky Municipal District as Artyomovsk Urban Settlement.
