= Kansky District =

Kansky District Канский район (Russian)
- District
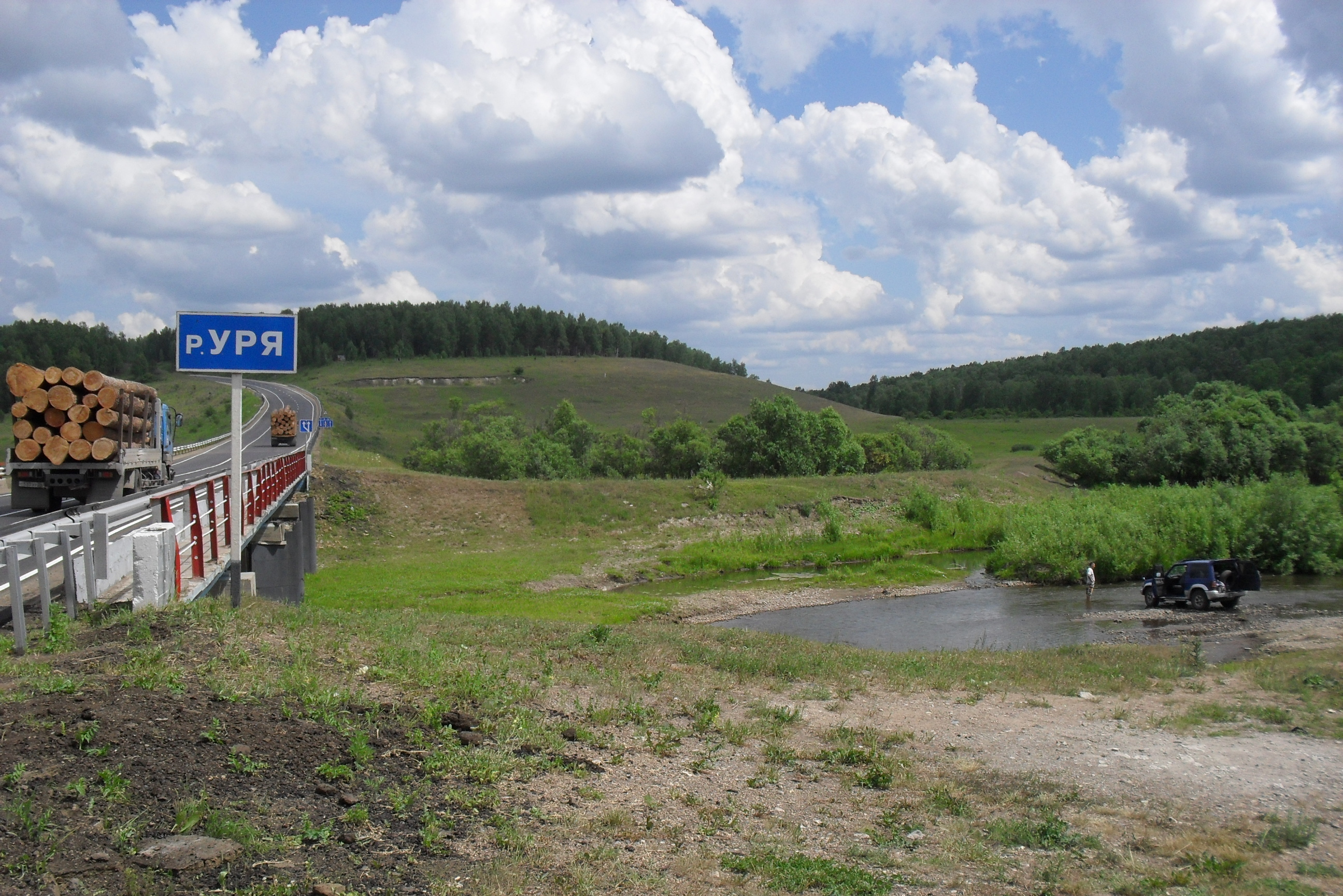
- Uraya River in Kansky District

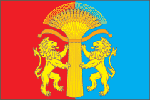
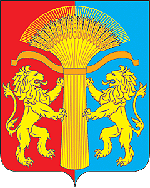
- Flag Coat of arms
- Location of Kansky District in Krasnoyarsk Krai
- Coordinates: 56°12′N 95°43′E
- Country: Russia
- Federal subject: Krasnoyarsk Krai
- Established: April 4, 1924
- Administrative center: Kansk

Government
  - Type: Local government
  - Body: Kansky District Council of Deputies
  - Head: Lyudmila N. Krasnoshapko

Area
  - Total: 4,321 km^{2} (1,668 sq mi)

Population (2010 Census)
  - Total: 27,281
  - Density: 6.314/km^{2} (16.35/sq mi)
  - Urban: 0%
  - Rural: 100%

Administrative structure
  - Administrative divisions: 15 selsoviet
  - Inhabited localities: 61 rural localities

Municipal structure
  - Municipally incorporated as: Kansky Municipal District
  - Municipal divisions: 0 urban settlements, 15 rural settlements
- Time zone: UTC+7 (MSK+4)
- OKTMO ID: 04621000
- Website: https://web.archive.org/web/20120304182750/http://www.kanskraion.ru/

Kansky District (Russian: Ка́нский райо́н) is an administrative and municipal district (raion), one of the forty-three in Krasnoyarsk Krai, Russia. It is located in the southeast of the krai and borders with Dzerzhinsky District in the north, Abansky District in the northeast, Ilansky District in the east, Irbeysky District in the south, Rybinsky District in the southwest, and with Sukhobuzimsky District in the west. The area of the district is 4,321 square kilometers (1,668 sq mi). Its administrative center is the town of Kansk (which is not administratively a part of the district). Population: 27,281 (2010 census); 28,667 (2002 Census); 31,177 (1989 Soviet census).

== Geography ==
The district is situated in the Kan River valley. The tributaries of the Kan flow through the district.

== History ==
The district was founded on April 4, 1924.

== Administrative and municipal status ==
Within the framework of administrative divisions, Kansky District is one of the forty-three in the krai. The town of Kansk serves as its administrative center, despite being incorporated separately as a krai town—an administrative unit with the status equal to that of the districts. The district is divided into fifteen selsoviets.

As a municipal division, the district is incorporated as Kansky Municipal District and is divided into fifteen rural settlements (corresponding to the administrative district's selsoviets). The krai town of Kansk is incorporated separately from the district as Kansk Urban Okrug.

== Economy ==
A part of the Kansk-Achinsk lignite basin, which in the early 1980s was developed into one of the largest coal areas of the Soviet Union, lies within the district's boundaries.

=== Transportation ===
The Trans-Siberian Railway runs through district territory from west to east. A part of the federal highway M53 passes through the district as well.

== Notable people ==
- Pyotr Slovtsov, opera tenor
