= Dzerzhinsky District, Krasnoyarsk Krai =

Dzerzhinsky District Дзержинский район (Russian)
- District
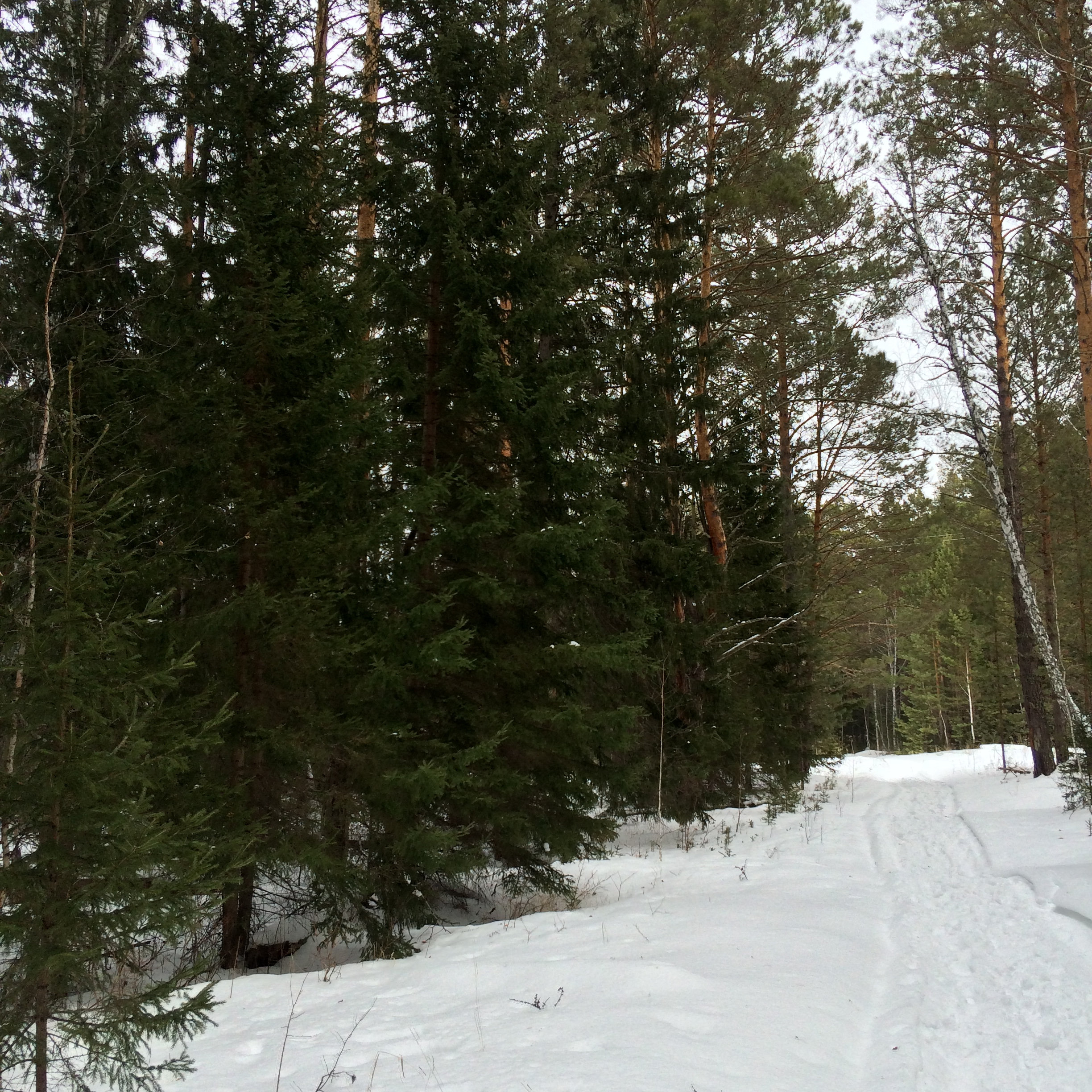
- Landscape in Dzerzhinsky District

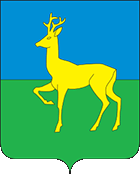
- Flag Coat of arms
- Location of Dzerzhinsky District in Krasnoyarsk Krai
- Coordinates: 56°49′51″N 95°13′22″E
- Country: Russia
- Federal subject: Krasnoyarsk Krai
- Established: December 7, 1934
- Administrative center: Dzerzhinskoye

Government
  - Type: Local government
  - Body: Dzerzhinsky District Council of Deputies
  - Head: Dmitry N. Ashayev

Area
  - Total: 3,569 km^{2} (1,378 sq mi)

Population (2010 Census)
  - Total: 14,552
  - Density: 4.077/km^{2} (10.56/sq mi)
  - Urban: 0%
  - Rural: 100%

Administrative structure
  - Administrative divisions: 8 selsoviet
  - Inhabited localities: 34 rural localities

Municipal structure
  - Municipally incorporated as: Dzerzhinsky Municipal District
  - Municipal divisions: 0 urban settlements, 8 rural settlements
- Time zone: UTC+7 (MSK+4)
- OKTMO ID: 04613000
- Website: http://www.krskstate.ru/msu/terdel/0/doc/20

Dzerzhinsky District (Russian: Дзержи́нский райо́н) is an administrative and municipal district (raion), one of the forty-three in Krasnoyarsk Krai, Russia. It is located in the southeast of the krai and borders with Taseyevsky District in the north, Abansky District in the east, Kansky District in the south, and with Sukhobuzimsky District in the west. The area of the district is 3,569 square kilometers (1,378 sq mi). Its administrative center is the rural locality (a selo) of Dzerzhinskoye. Population: 14,552 (2010 census); 17,028 (2002 Census); 20,485 (1989 Soviet census). The population of Dzerzhinskoye accounts for 50.7% of the district's total population.

== Geography ==
The district is situated in the Kan River basin.

== History ==
The district was founded on December 7, 1934.

== Government ==
The Head of the District and the Chairman of the District Council is Dmitry N. Ashayev.

== Economy ==
=== Transportation ===
The Trans-Siberian Railway runs through the district.
