= Sayansky (urban-type settlement) =

Sayansky Саянский
- Urban-type settlement
- Interactive map of Sayansky
- Location of Sayansky Sayansky (Krasnoyarsk Krai)
- Coordinates: 55.5511°N 94.7084°E
- Country: Russia
- Federal subject: Krasnoyarsk Krai
- Administrative district: Rybinsky District
- Founded: 1959

Population (2010 Census)
  - Total: 4,047
  - Estimate (2025): 4,027 (−0.5%)
- Time zone: UTC+7 (MSK+4)
- Postal code: 663973
- OKTMO ID: 04647160051

Sayansky (Russian: Сая́нский) is an urban locality (an urban-type settlement) in Rybinsky District of Krasnoyarsk Krai, Russia. Population: 4,047 (2010 census); 4,025 (2002 census); 3,957 (1989 Soviet census).
