= Aginskoye, Krasnoyarsk Krai =

Aginskoye Агинское
- Selo
- Interactive map of Aginskoye
- Location of Aginskoye Aginskoye (Krasnoyarsk Krai)
- Coordinates: 55°15′39″N 94°54′22″E
- Country: Russia
- Federal subject: Krasnoyarsk Krai
- Administrative district: Sayansky District
- SettlementSelsoviet: Aginskoye Settlement
- Founded: 1829
- Elevation: 342 m (1,122 ft)

Population (2010 Census)
  - Total: 5,584
  - Estimate (2010): 5,584 (0%)

Administrative status
  - Capital of: Sayansky District, Aginskoye Settlement

Municipal status
  - Municipal district: Sayansky Municipal District
  - Rural settlement: Aginsky Selsoviet Rural Settlement
  - Capital of: Sayansky Municipal District, Aginsky Selsoviet Rural Settlement
- Time zone: UTC+7 (MSK+4)
- Postal code: 663580
- OKTMO ID: 04648402101

Aginskoye (Russian: Аги́нское) is a rural locality (a selo) and the administrative center of Sayansky District of Krasnoyarsk Krai, Russia. Population: 5,584 (2010 census); 6,173 (2002 census); 7,056 (1989 Soviet census).
