= Uzhursky District =

Uzhursky District Ужурский район (Russian)
- District
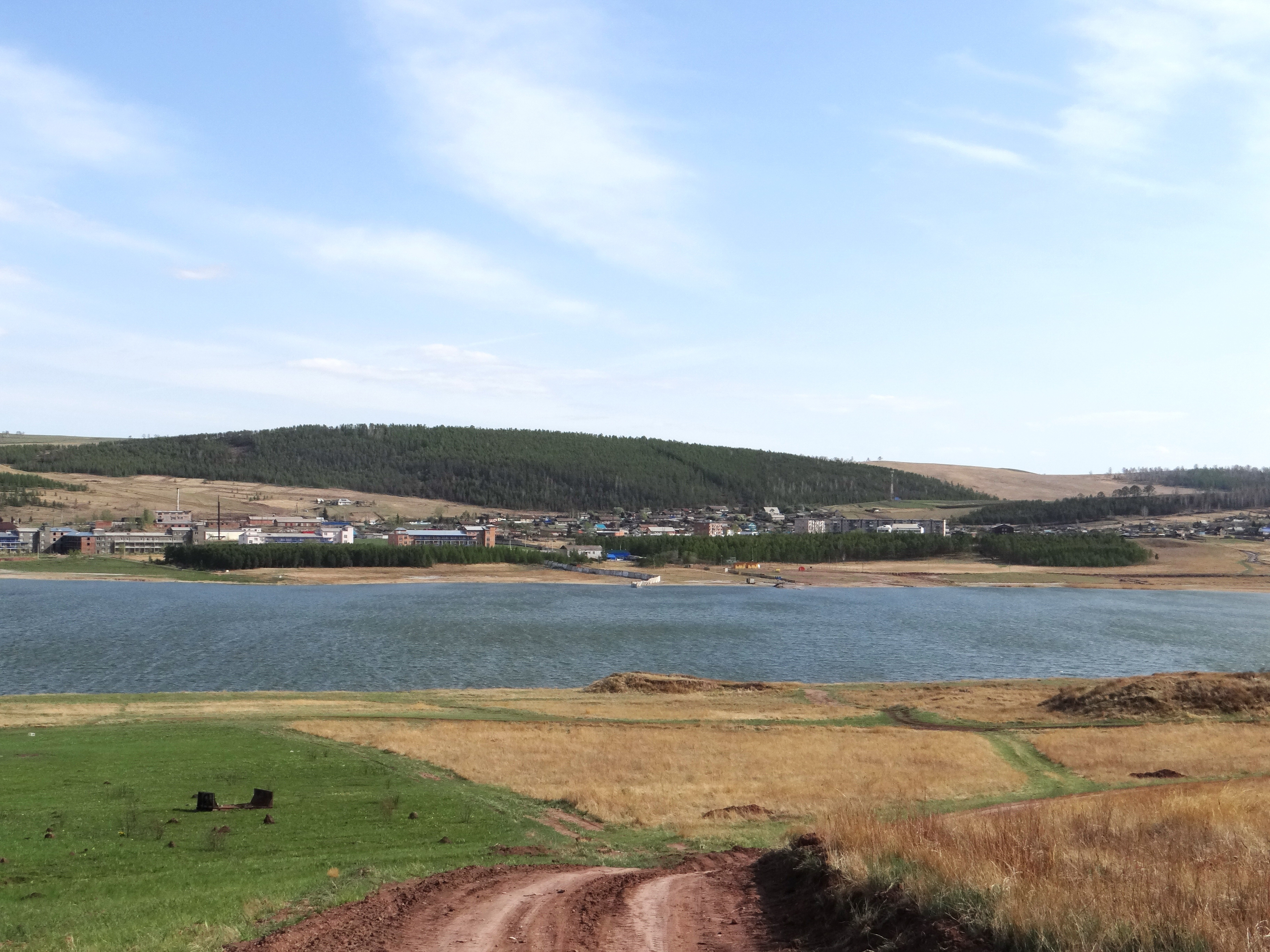
- Uchum Lake, Uzhursky District

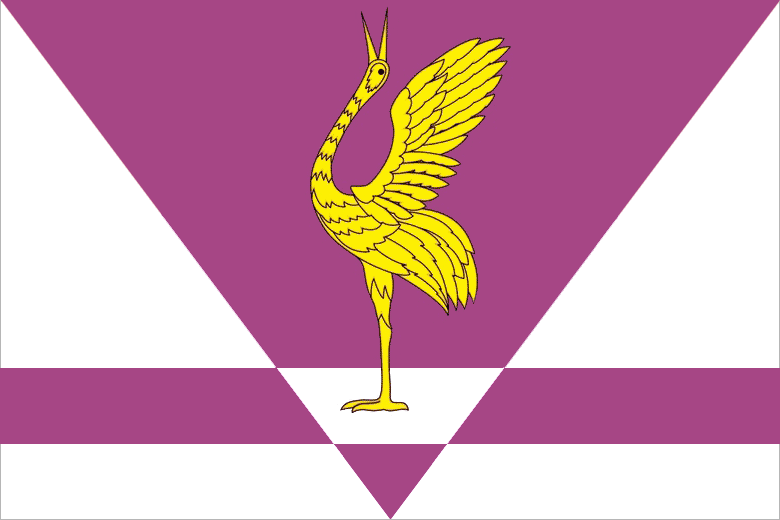
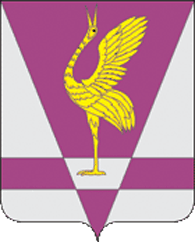
- Flag Coat of arms
- Location of Uzhursky District in Krasnoyarsk Krai
- Coordinates: 55°19′03″N 89°49′21″E
- Country: Russia
- Federal subject: Krasnoyarsk Krai
- Established: April 4, 1924
- Administrative center: Uzhur

Government
  - Type: Local government
  - Body: Uzhursky District Council of Deputies
  - Head: Gazilya N. Kuznetsova

Area
  - Total: 4,226 km^{2} (1,632 sq mi)

Population (2010 Census)
  - Total: 33,739
  - Density: 7.984/km^{2} (20.68/sq mi)
  - Urban: 47.7%
  - Rural: 52.3%

Administrative structure
  - Administrative divisions: 1 District towns, 12 Selsoviets
  - Inhabited localities: 1 cities/towns, 50 rural localities

Municipal structure
  - Municipally incorporated as: Uzhursky Municipal District
  - Municipal divisions: 1 urban settlements, 12 rural settlements
- Time zone: UTC+7 (MSK+4)
- OKTMO ID: 04656000
- Website: http://www.rsuzhur.ru/

Uzhursky District (Russian: Ужу́рский райо́н) is an administrative and municipal district (raion), one of the forty-three in Krasnoyarsk Krai, Russia. It is located in the southwest of the krai and borders with Nazarovsky District in the north, Balakhtinsky District in the east, Novosyolovsky District in the southeast, the Republic of Khakassia in the south, and with Sharypovsky District in the west and northwest. The area of the district is 4,226 square kilometers (1,632 sq mi). Its administrative center is the town of Uzhur. Population: 33,739 (2010 census); 36,169 (2002 Census); 48,363 (1989 Soviet census). The population of Uzhur accounts for 47.7% of the district's total population.

== History ==
The district was founded on April 4, 1924.

== Government ==
As of 2013, the Head of the District and the Chairman of the District Council is Gazilya N. Kuznetsova.
