= Dubinino, Krasnoyarsk Krai =

Dubinino Дубинино
- Urban-type settlement
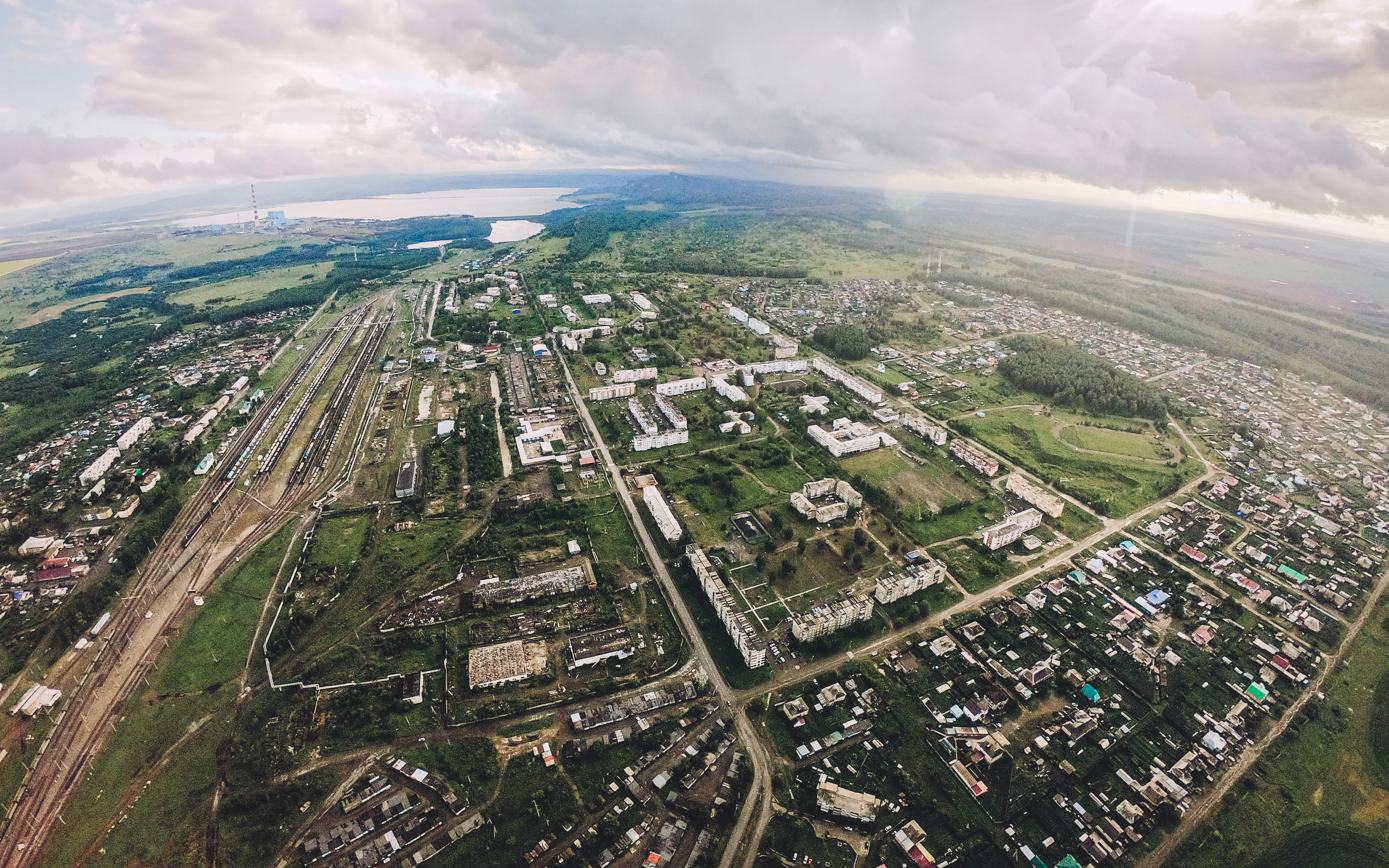
- Interactive map of Dubinino
- Location of Dubinino Dubinino (Krasnoyarsk Krai)
- Coordinates: 55.6238°N 89.0850°E
- Country: Russia
- Federal subject: Krasnoyarsk Krai
- Founded: 1961

Population (2010 Census)
  - Total: 9,497
  - Estimate (2025): 7,262 (−23.5%)
- Time zone: UTC+7 (MSK+4)
- Postal code: 662306
- OKTMO ID: 04740000061

Dubinino (Russian: Дуби́нино) is an urban locality (an urban-type settlement) in Krasnoyarsk Krai, Russia. Population: 9,497 (2010 census); 12,028 (2002 census); 12,185 (1989 Soviet census).
