= Solnechny, Krasnoyarsk Krai =

Solnechny Солнечный
- Settlement
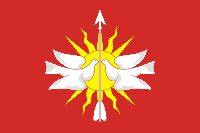
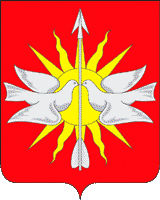
- Flag Coat of arms
- Interactive map of Solnechny
- Location of Solnechny Solnechny (Krasnoyarsk Krai)
- Coordinates: 55°18′N 89°43′E
- Country: Russia
- Federal subject: Krasnoyarsk Krai
- Founded: October 19, 1965
- Urban-type settlement status since: October 19, 1965

Population (2010 Census)
  - Total: 10,384
  - Estimate (2025): 8,412 (−19%)

Administrative status
  - Subordinated to: closed administrative-territorial formation of Solnechny
  - Capital of: closed administrative-territorial formation of Solnechny

Municipal status
  - Urban okrug: Solnechny Urban Okrug
  - Capital of: Solnechny Urban Okrug
- Time zone: UTC+7 (MSK+4)
- Postal code: 660947
- OKTMO ID: 04780000051
- Website: zato-solnechnyi.ru

Solnechny population
- 2010 Census: 10,384
- 2002 Census: 10,809

Solnechny (Russian: Со́лнечный) is a closed urban locality (a settlement) in Krasnoyarsk Krai, Russia. As of the 2010 Census, its population was 10,384.

== History ==
It was established as a work settlement on October 19, 1965 and was alternatively known as Uzhur-4 (Ужур-4). It was officially recognized as a closed settlement on July 14, 1992. It was municipally incorporated as an urban okrug on October 6, 2003.

== Administrative and municipal status ==
Within the framework of administrative divisions, it is incorporated as the closed administrative-territorial formation of Solnechny—an administrative unit with the status equal to that of the districts. As a municipal division, the closed administrative-territorial formation of Solnechny is incorporated as Solnechny Urban Okrug.
