= Nizhnyaya Poyma =

Nizhnyaya Poyma Нижняя Пойма
- Urban-type settlement
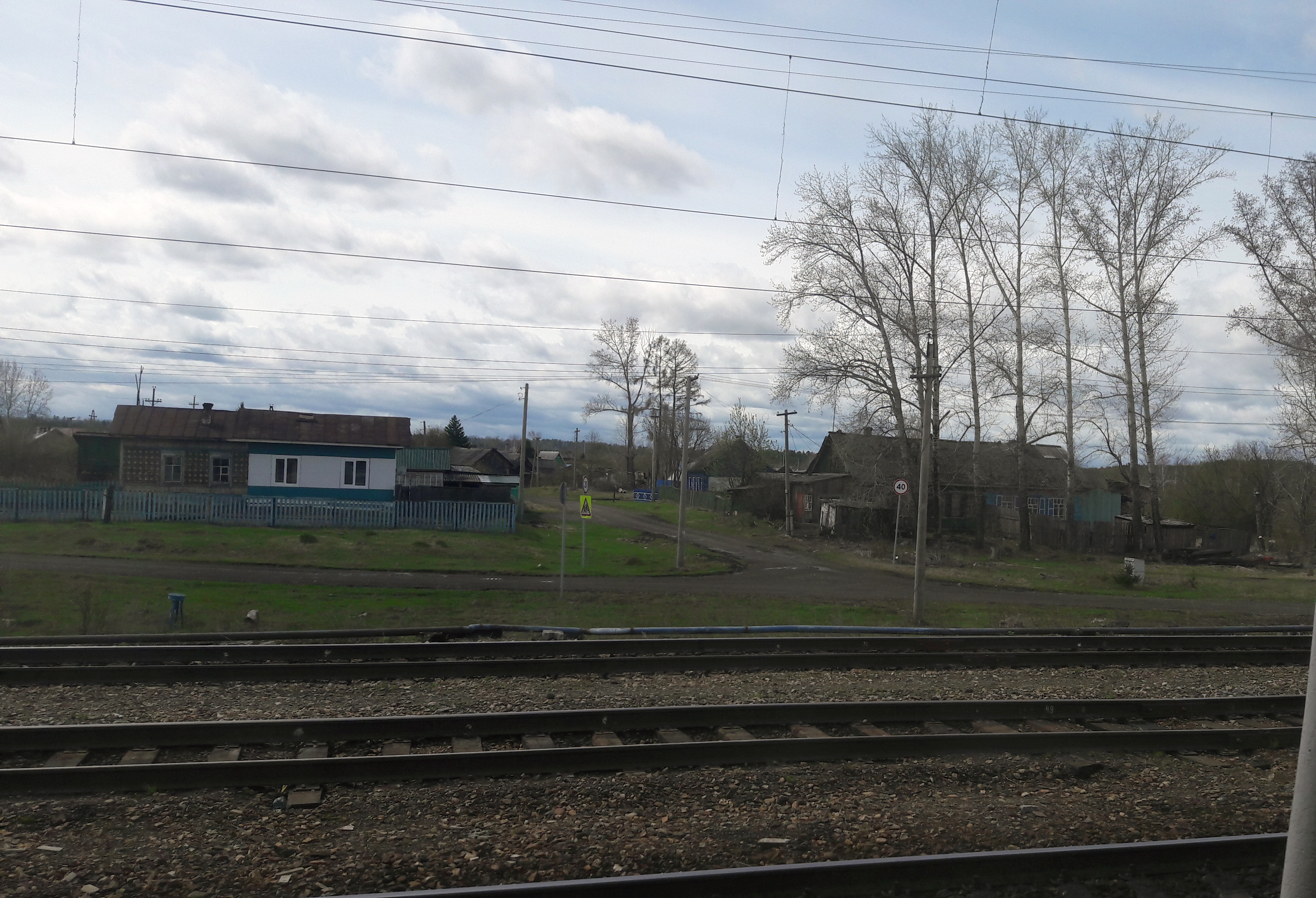

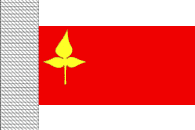
- Flag
- Interactive map of Nizhnyaya Poyma
- Location of Nizhnyaya Poyma Nizhnyaya Poyma (Krasnoyarsk Krai)
- Coordinates: 56.1625°N 97.2029°E
- Country: Russia
- Federal subject: Krasnoyarsk Krai
- Administrative district: Nizhneingashsky District

Population (2010 Census)
  - Total: 9,000
  - Estimate (2025): 6,431 (−28.5%)
- Time zone: UTC+7 (MSK+4)
- Postal code: 663840
- OKTMO ID: 04639154051

Nizhnyaya Poyma (Russian: Ни́жняя По́йма) is an urban locality (an urban-type settlement) in Nizhneingashsky District of Krasnoyarsk Krai, Russia. Population: 9,000 (2010 census); 9,711 (2002 census); 9,844 (1989 Soviet census).
