= Sharypovo, Krasnoyarsk Krai =

Town in Krasnoyarsk Krai, Russia

Sharypovo Шарыпово
- Town
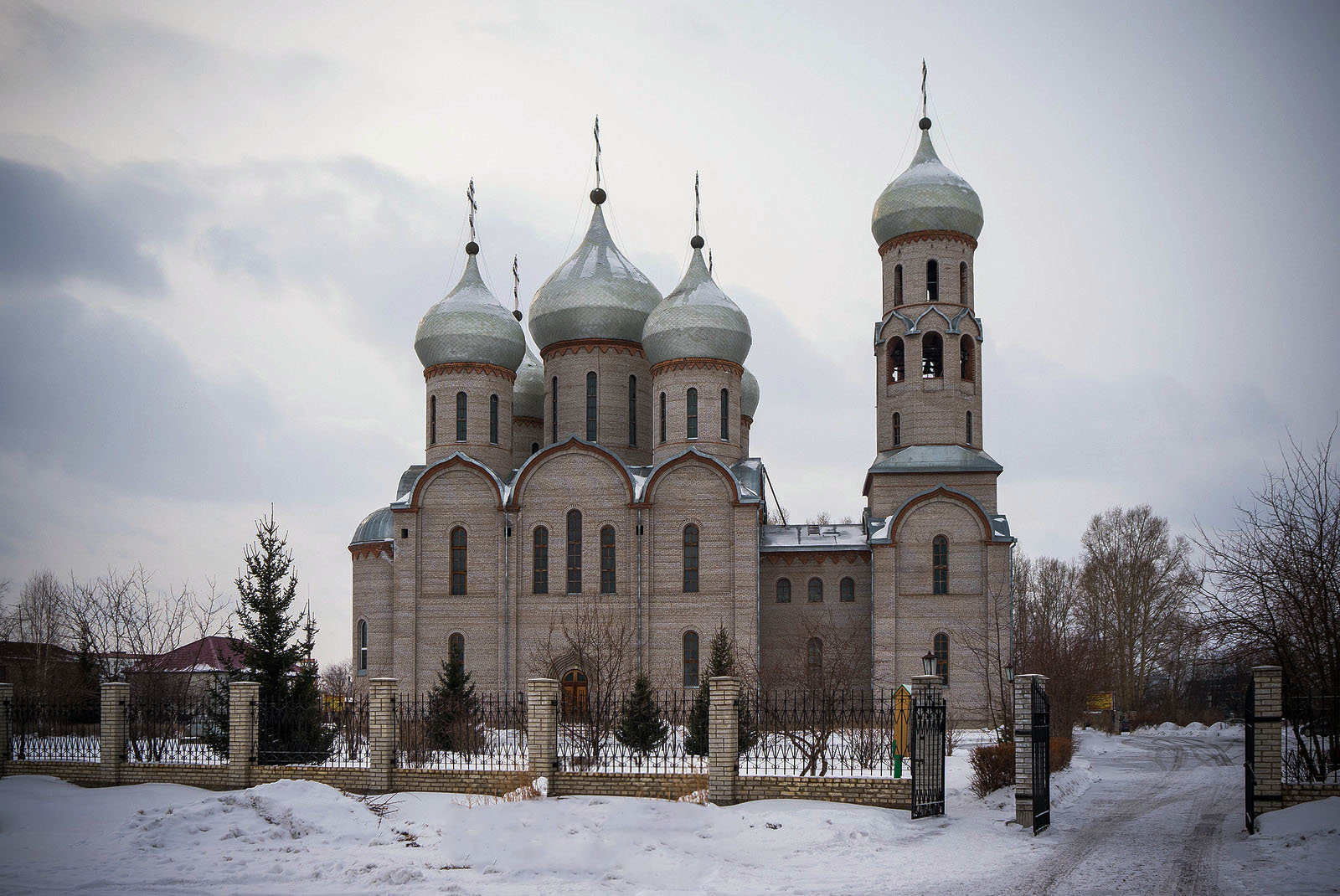
- Holy Trinity Cathedral

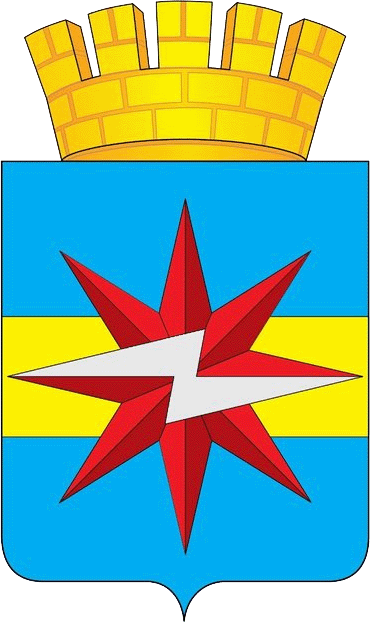
- Flag Coat of arms
- Interactive map of Sharypovo
- Location of Sharypovo Sharypovo (Krasnoyarsk Krai)
- Coordinates: 55°32′N 89°12′E
- Country: Russia
- Federal subject: Krasnoyarsk Krai
- Founded: second half of the 18th century
- Town status since: 1981
- Elevation: 310 m (1,020 ft)

Population (2010 Census)
  - Total: 38,561
  - Estimate (2021): 33,961 (−11.9%)

Administrative status
  - Subordinated to: krai town of Sharypovo
  - Capital of: krai town of Sharypovo, Sharypovsky District

Municipal status
  - Urban okrug: Sharypovo Urban Okrug
  - Capital of: Sharypovo Urban Okrug, Sharypovsky Municipal District
- Time zone: UTC+7 (MSK+4)
- Postal code: 662305–662315
- OKTMO ID: 04740000001
- Website: www.gorodsharypovo.ru

Sharypovo (Russian: Шары́пово) is a town in Krasnoyarsk Krai, Russia, located on the Beresh River (Chulym's basin), 414 kilometers (257 mi) west of Krasnoyarsk. Population: 38,561 (2010 census); 41,532 (2002 census); 39,771 (1989 Soviet census).

== History ==
It was founded in the second half of the 18th century as a village and later grew into a selo. Town status was granted to it in 1981. In 1985–1988, it was called Chernenko (Черне́нко), after the General Secretary of the Communist Party of the Soviet Union Konstantin Chernenko, who was born here.

== Administrative and municipal status ==
Within the framework of administrative divisions, Sharypovo serves as the administrative center of Sharypovsky District, even though it is not a part of it. As an administrative division, it is, together with two urban-type settlements (Goryachegorsk and Dubinino), incorporated separately as the krai town of Sharypovo—an administrative unit with the status equal to that of the districts. As a municipal division, the krai town of Sharypovo is incorporated as Sharypovo Urban Okrug.

== Points of interest ==
- Beryozovskaya GRES
