= Kedrovy, Yemelyanovsky District, Krasnoyarsk Krai =

Kedrovy Кедровый
- Urban-type settlement
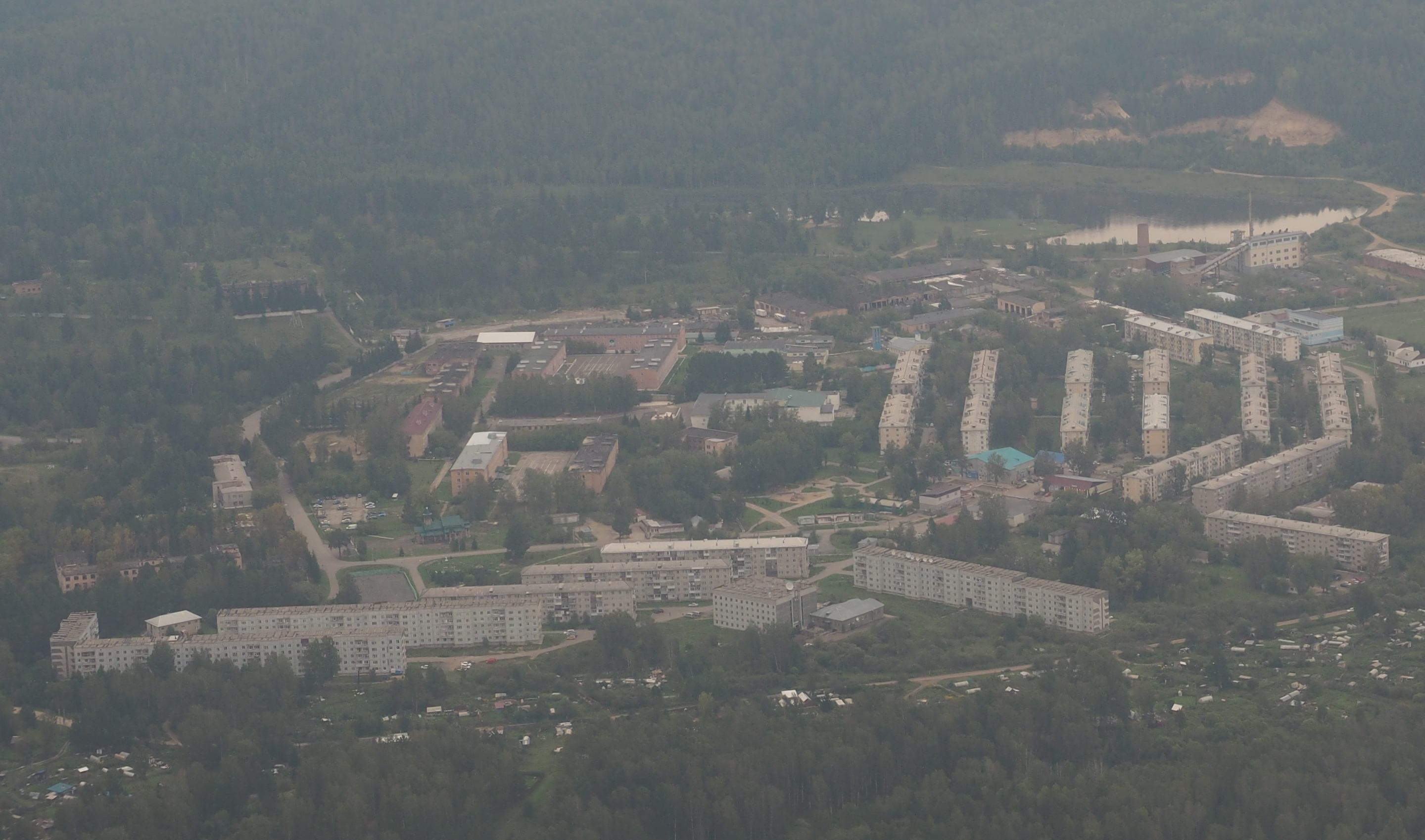
- View of Kedrovy

- Flag
- Interactive map of Kedrovy
- Location of Kedrovy Kedrovy (Krasnoyarsk Krai)
- Coordinates: 56°17′N 91°32′E
- Country: Russia
- Federal subject: Krasnoyarsk Krai
- Administrative district: Yemelyanovsky District
- Urban-type settlementSelsoviet: Urban-type settlement of Kedrovy
- Founded: 1962

Area
  - Total: 27.489 km^{2} (10.614 sq mi)

Population (2010 Census)
  - Total: 4,692
  - Estimate (2021): 3,835 (−18.3%)
  - Density: 170.7/km^{2} (442.1/sq mi)

Administrative status
  - Capital of: Urban-type settlement of Kedrovy

Municipal status
  - Urban okrug: Kedrovy Urban Okrug
  - Capital of: Kedrovy Urban Okrug
- Time zone: UTC+7 (MSK+4)
- Postal code: 660910
- OKTMO ID: 04775000051

Kedrovy (Russian: Кедро́вый) is an urban locality (an urban-type settlement) in Yemelyanovsky District of Krasnoyarsk Krai, Russia, located 50 kilometers (31 mi) from Krasnoyarsk, the administrative center of the krai. Population: 4,692 (2010 census); 5,223 (2002 Census).

== History ==
Until January 1, 2007, Kedrovy had closed status.

== Administrative and municipal status ==
Within the framework of administrative divisions, Kedrovy is incorporated within Yemelyanovsky District as an urban-type settlement—an administrative unit equal in status to that of the selsoviets. As a municipal division, Kedrovy is incorporated separately as Kedrovy Urban Okrug.
