= Zaozyorny, Krasnoyarsk Krai =

Town in Krasnoyarsk Krai, Russia

Zaozyorny Заозёрный
- Town
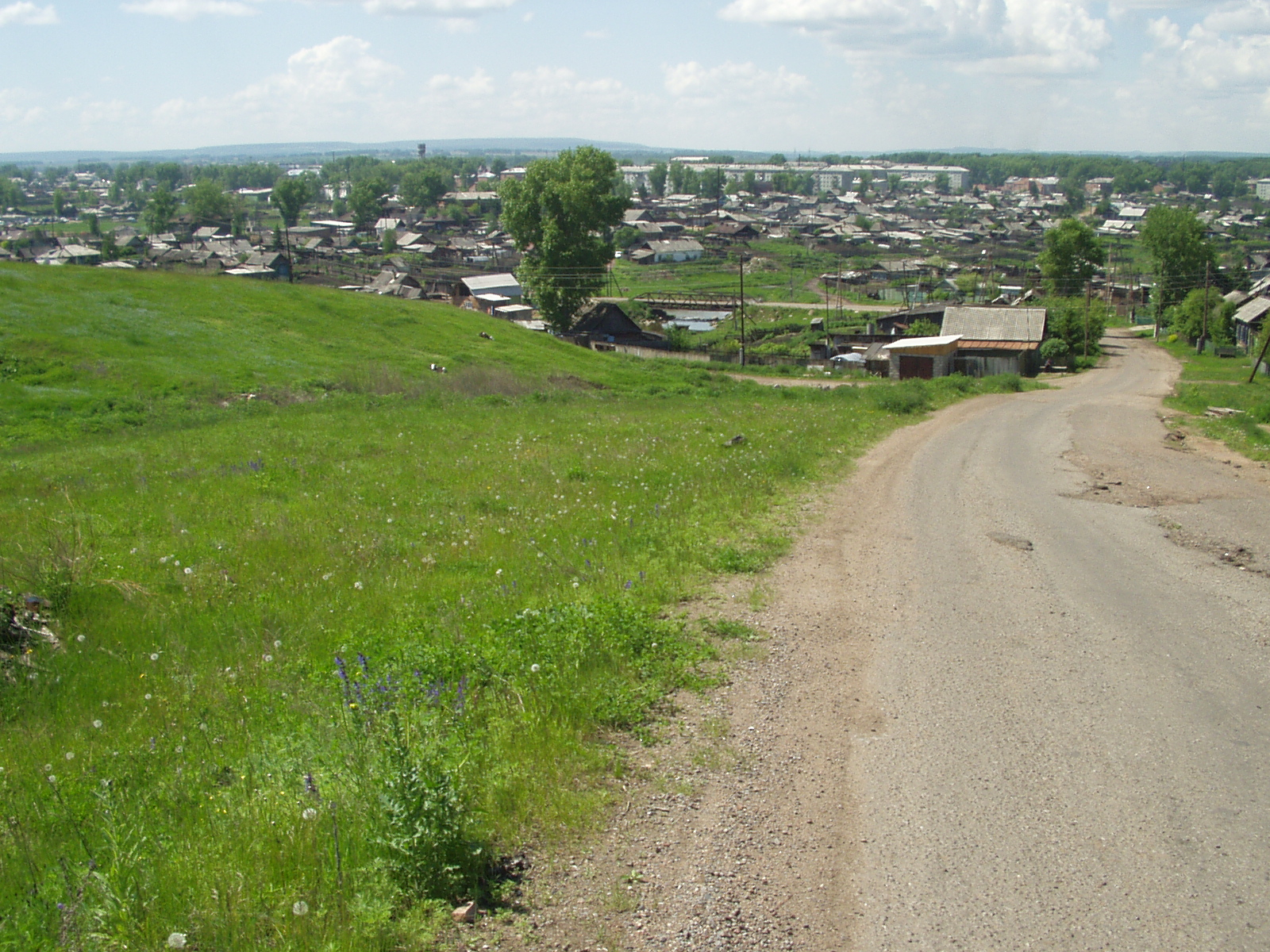
- Panorama of Zaozyorny

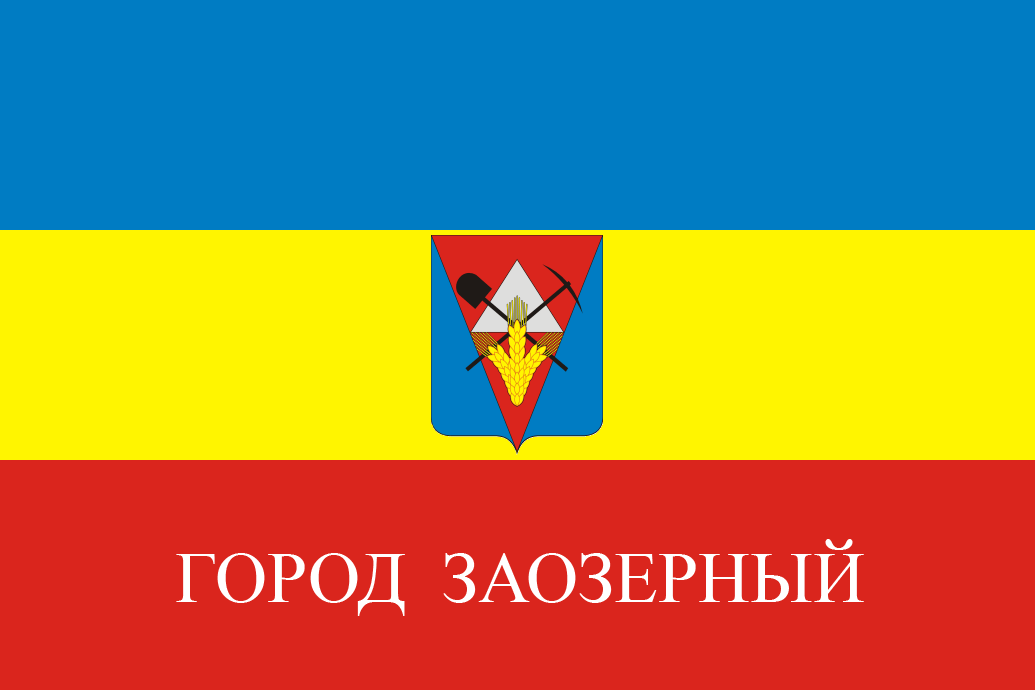
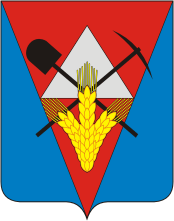
- Flag Coat of arms
- Interactive map of Zaozyorny
- Location of Zaozyorny Zaozyorny (Krasnoyarsk Krai)
- Coordinates: 55°58′N 94°42′E
- Country: Russia
- Federal subject: Krasnoyarsk Krai
- Administrative district: Rybinsky District
- District townSelsoviet: Zaozyorny
- Founded: 1776
- Town status since: 1948
- Elevation: 210 m (690 ft)

Population (2010 Census)
  - Total: 10,681
  - Estimate (2021): 9,954 (−6.8%)

Administrative status
  - Capital of: Rybinsky District, district town of Zaozyorny

Municipal status
  - Municipal district: Rybinsky Municipal District
  - Urban settlement: Zaozyorny Urban Settlement
  - Capital of: Rybinsky Municipal District, Zaozyorny Urban Settlement
- Time zone: UTC+7 (MSK+4)
- Postal code: 164209
- OKTMO ID: 04647101001

Zaozyorny (Russian: Заозёрный) is a town and the administrative center of Rybinsky District of Krasnoyarsk Krai, Russia, located on the Barga River (Yenisei's basin), the affluent of the Kan, 166 kilometers (103 mi) east of Krasnoyarsk on the 4,263rd km of the Trans-Siberian Railway (Zaozyornaya railway station). Population: 10,681 (2010 census); 12,476 (2002 census); 15,714 (1989 Soviet census).

== Etymology ==
The name of the town is an adjective meaning "beyond the lakes", referring to the lakes in the south the town is abutting.

== History ==
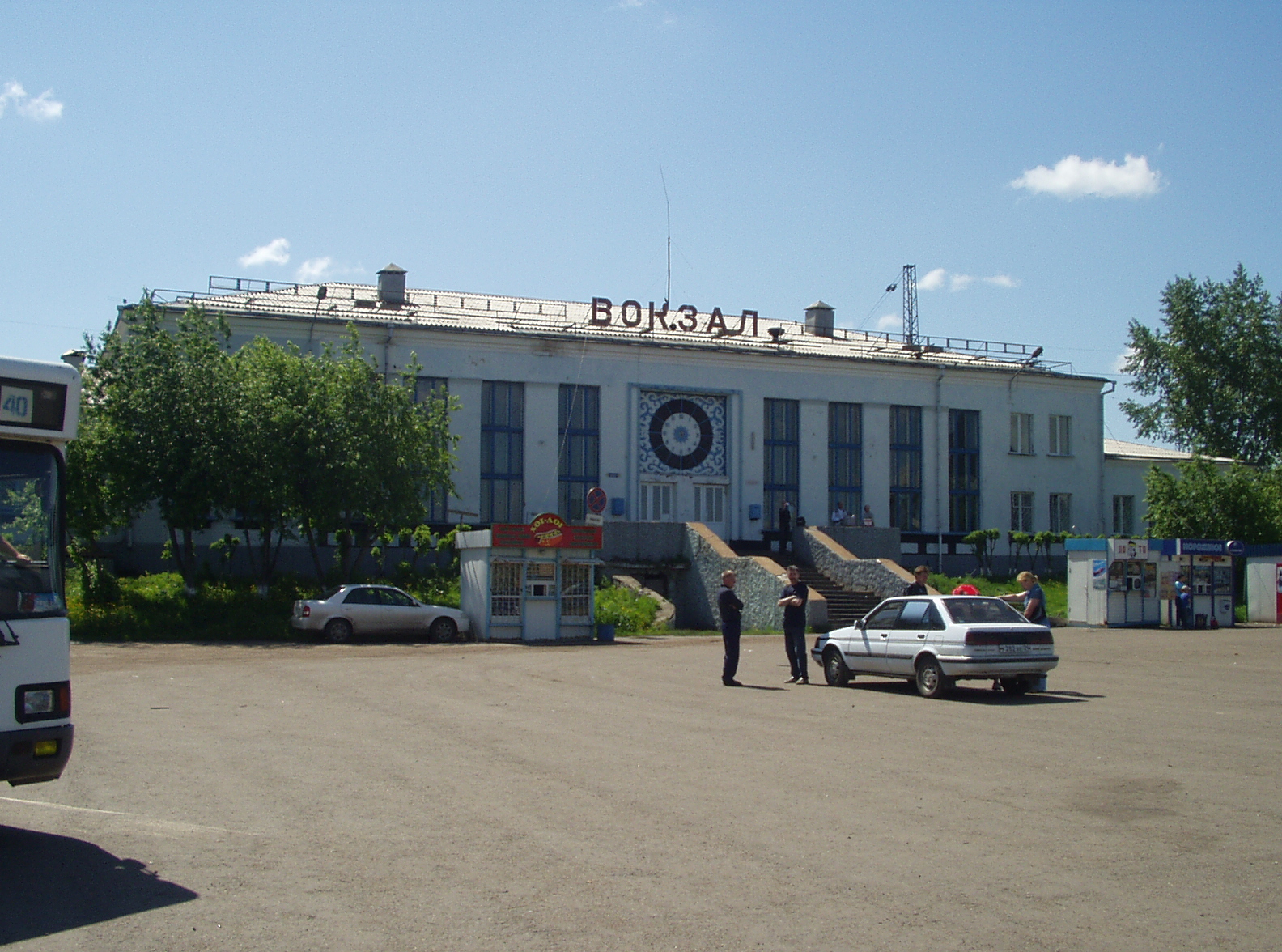
Railway Station Building of Zaozyorny

It was established in 1776 as the sloboda of Troitsko-Zaozyornaya in the land owned by the Troitsko-Turukhansky Monastery. The main occupation of the settlers was mica mining; later placer mining. In 1934, it was granted urban-type settlement status and renamed Zaozyorny due to the anti-religious matters (the "Troitsko-" part of the name means "of the Trinity"). It was granted town status in 1948.

== Administrative and municipal status ==
Within the framework of administrative divisions, Zaozyorny serves as the administrative center of Rybinsky District. As an administrative division, it is incorporated within Rybinsky District as the district town of Zaozyorny. As a municipal division, the district town of Zaozyorny is incorporated within Rybinsky Municipal District as Zaozyorny Urban Settlement.

== Economy ==
In the Soviet era, a number of plants and factories were built in Zaozyorny: electronic parts, brick, baking with a huge grain elevator, milk, furniture, and sewing factories. All of them become barely functional after the dissolution of the Soviet Union. In the beginning of the 2000s, the furniture and sewing factories were funded by the Krasnoyarsk companies and became functional again, while the mica mill yet remains in crisis.

In 2002 and 2006, the town faced a critical situation with the central heating functionality due to the local government's financial crisis.
