= Borodino, Krasnoyarsk Krai =

Town in Krasnoyarsk Krai, Russia

Borodino Бородино
- Town
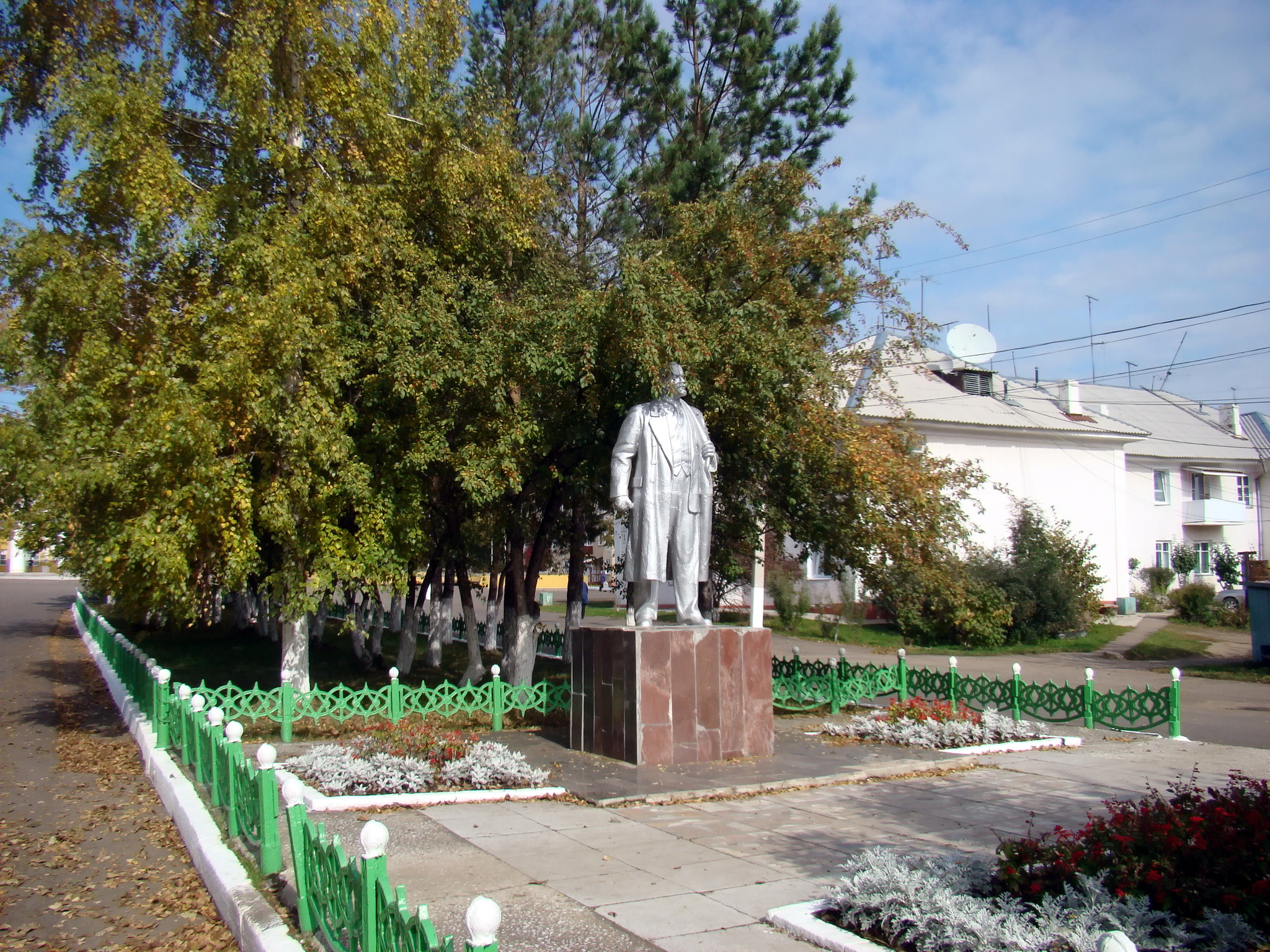
- Monument to Vladimir Lenin in Borodino

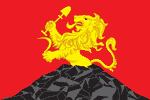
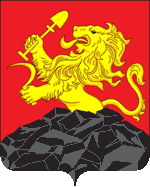
- Flag Coat of arms
- Interactive map of Borodino
- Location of Borodino Borodino (Krasnoyarsk Krai)
- Coordinates: 55°54′20″N 94°53′59″E
- Country: Russia
- Federal subject: Krasnoyarsk Krai
- Founded: 1949
- Town status since: 1981
- Elevation: 330 m (1,080 ft)

Population (2010 Census)
  - Total: 17,416
  - Estimate (2021): 15,174 (−12.9%)

Administrative status
  - Subordinated to: krai town of Borodino
  - Capital of: krai town of Borodino

Municipal status
  - Urban okrug: Borodino Urban Okrug
  - Capital of: Borodino Urban Okrug
- Time zone: UTC+7 (MSK+4)
- Postal codes: 663980, 663981
- OKTMO ID: 04707000001
- Website: www.sibborodino.ru

Borodino (Russian: Бородино́) is a town in Krasnoyarsk Krai, Russia, located 186 kilometers (116 mi) northeast of Krasnoyarsk, the administrative center of the krai. Population: 17,416 (2010 census); 19,181 (2002 census); 18,426 (1989 Soviet census).

== History ==
It was founded in 1949 as a coal miners' settlement. Town status was granted to it in 1981.

== Administrative and municipal status ==
Within the framework of administrative divisions, it is incorporated as the krai town of Borodino—an administrative unit with the status equal to that of the districts. As a municipal division, the krai town of Borodino is incorporated as Borodino Urban Okrug.
