= Razdolinsk =

Razdolinsk Раздолинск
- Urban-type settlement
- Location of Razdolinsk
- Location of Razdolinsk Razdolinsk (Krasnoyarsk Krai)
- Coordinates: 58.4188°N 94.6203°E
- Country: Russia
- Federal subject: Krasnoyarsk Krai
- Administrative district: Motyginsky District

Population (2010 Census)
  - Total: 2,502
- Time zone: UTC+7 (MSK+4)
- Postal code(s): 663415
- OKTMO ID: 04635154051

Razdolinsk (Russian: Раздо́линск) is an urban locality (an urban-type settlement) in Motyginsky District of Krasnoyarsk Krai, Russia. Population: 2,502 (2010 Census); 2,806 (2002 Census); 3,800 (1989 Soviet census).
