= Partizansky District, Krasnoyarsk Krai =

Partizansky District Партизанский район (Russian)
- District
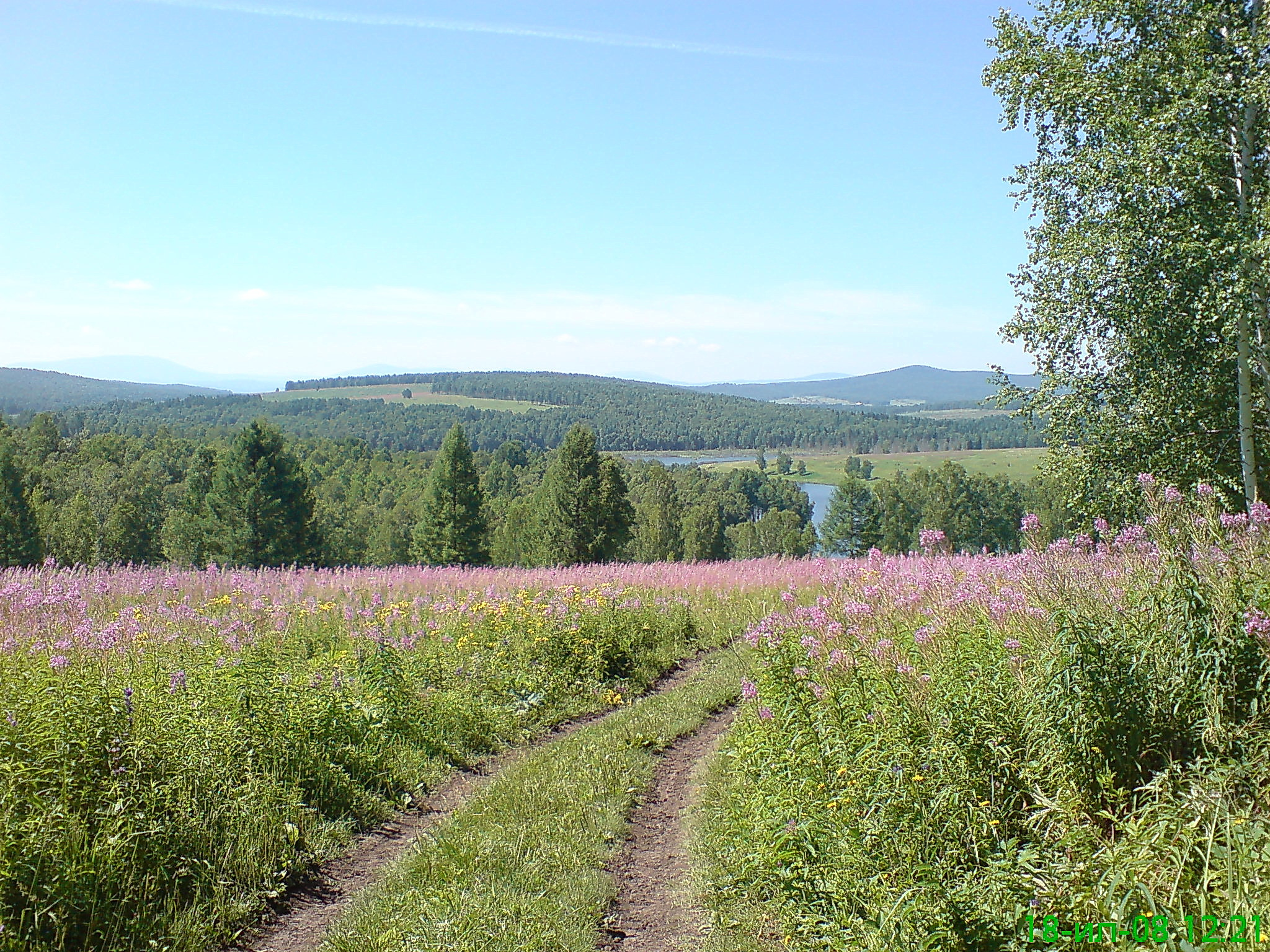
- Landscape in Partizansky District

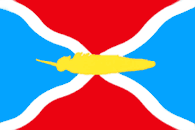
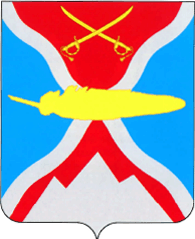
- Flag Coat of arms
- Location of Partizansky District in Krasnoyarsk Krai
- Coordinates: 55°30′04″N 94°22′59″E
- Country: Russia
- Federal subject: Krasnoyarsk Krai
- Established: April 4, 1924
- Administrative center: Partizanskoye

Government
  - Type: Local government
  - Body: Partizansky District Council of Deputies
  - Head: Alexander A. Zemurbeys

Area
  - Total: 4,959 km^{2} (1,915 sq mi)

Population (2010 Census)
  - Total: 10,254
  - Density: 2.068/km^{2} (5.355/sq mi)
  - Urban: 0%
  - Rural: 100%

Administrative structure
  - Administrative divisions: 9 selsoviet
  - Inhabited localities: 32 rural localities

Municipal structure
  - Municipally incorporated as: Partizansky Municipal District
  - Municipal divisions: 0 urban settlements, 9 rural settlements
- Time zone: UTC+7 (MSK+4)
- OKTMO ID: 04643000
- Website: http://www.partizansky.krskstate.ru/

Partizansky District (Russian: Партиза́нский райо́н) is an administrative and municipal district (raion), one of the forty-three in Krasnoyarsk Krai, Russia. It is located in the south of the krai and borders with Uyarsky District in the north, Rybinsky District in the northeast, Sayansky District in the east, Kuraginsky District in the south, and with Mansky District in the west. The area of the district is 4,959 square kilometers (1,915 sq mi). Its administrative center is the rural locality (a selo) of Partizanskoye. Population: 10,254 (2010 census); 12,437 (2002 Census); 15,412 (1989 Soviet census). The population of Partizanskoye accounts for 34.4% of the district's total population.

== History ==
The district was founded on April 4, 1924.

== Government ==
As of 2013, the Head of the District is Alexander A. Zemurbeys and the Chairman of the District Council is Alexander V. Kudryavtsev.
