= Kansk =

Town in Krasnoyarsk Krai, Russia

Kansk Канск
- Town
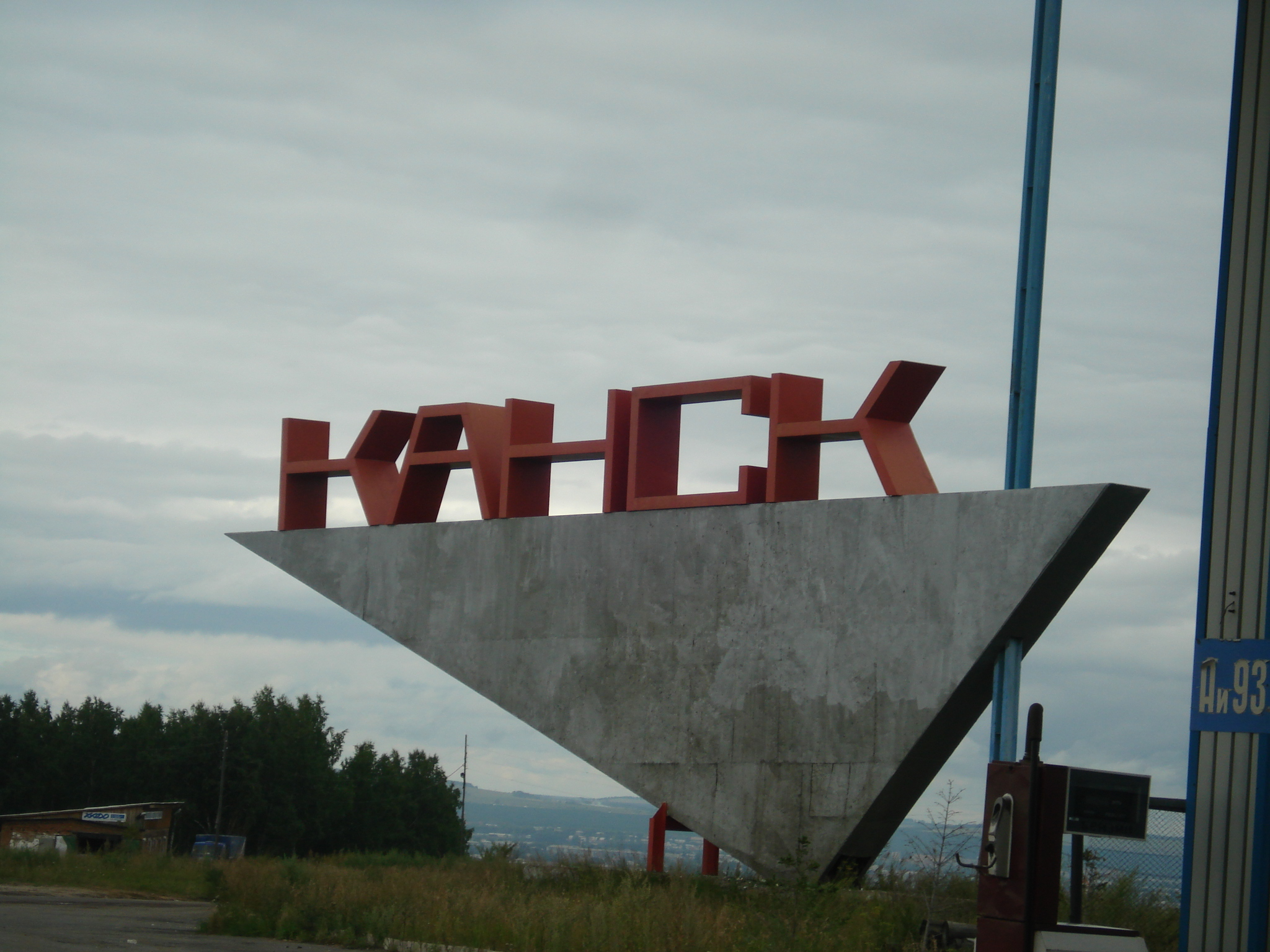
- Welcome sign at the entrance to Kansk

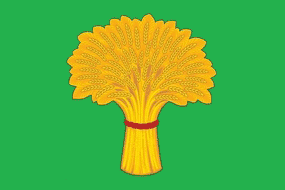
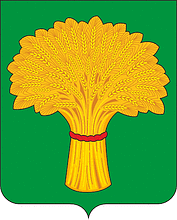
- Flag Coat of arms
- Interactive map of Kansk
- Location of Kansk Kansk (Krasnoyarsk Krai)
- Coordinates: 56°12′N 95°43′E
- Country: Russia
- Federal subject: Krasnoyarsk Krai
- Founded: 1628
- Town status since: 1782
- Elevation: 200 m (660 ft)

Population (2010 Census)
  - Total: 94,226
  - Estimate (2025): 85,182 (−9.6%)
  - Rank: 182nd in 2010

Administrative status
  - Subordinated to: krai town of Kansk
  - Capital of: krai town of Kansk, Kansky District

Municipal status
  - Urban okrug: Kansk Urban Okrug
  - Capital of: Kansk Urban Okrug, Kansky Municipal District
- Time zone: UTC+7 (MSK+4)
- Postal codes: 660861, 663600–663602, 663604–663606, 663609, 663610, 663612–663615, 663619
- Dialing code: +7 39161
- OKTMO ID: 04720000001
- Website: kansk-adm.ru

Kansk (Russian: Канск) is a town in Krasnoyarsk Krai, Russia, located on both banks of the Kan River. Population: 94,226 (2010 census); 103,000 (2002 census); 109,607 (1989 Soviet census).

Historical population
| Year | Pop. | ±% |
|---|---|---|
| 1897 | 7,537 | — |
| 1926 | 19,000 | +152.1% |
| 1939 | 41,584 | +118.9% |
| 1959 | 82,662 | +98.8% |
| 1970 | 94,680 | +14.5% |
| 1979 | 100,558 | +6.2% |
| 1989 | 109,607 | +9.0% |
| 2002 | 103,000 | −6.0% |
| 2010 | 94,226 | −8.5% |
| 2021 | 86,816 | −7.9% |
Source: Census data

== History and economy ==
Founded in 1628 as a Russian fort, it was transferred to its current location in 1636 and granted town status in 1782.

There was a branch of the Krasnoyarsk camp complex in Kansk from 1938 onwards. The burial ground of those who died there, and of those who were executed or died in Kansk prison, is today covered by new buildings. Many of those shot during the Great Terror were buried in the Kan-Perevoznesenskoe cemetery.

The town is a center of the Kansk-Achinsk lignite basin, which in the early 1980s was developed into one of the largest coal areas of the Soviet Union. It also has cotton, timber, hydrolysis, and food industries.

== Administrative and municipal status ==
Within the framework of administrative divisions, Kansk serves as the administrative center of Kansky District, even though it is not a part of it. As an administrative division, it is incorporated separately as the krai town of Kansk—an administrative unit with the status equal to that of the districts. As a municipal division, the krai town of Kansk is incorporated as Kansk Urban Okrug.

== Miscellaneous ==
The town is home to the Kansk air base and it is crossed by the Trans-Siberian Railway.

== Notable people ==
- Pyotr Slovtsov, tenor
