= Teya, Russia =

Teya Тея
- Selo
- Interactive map of Teya
- Location of Teya Teya (Krasnoyarsk Krai)
- Coordinates: 60°22′20″N 92°37′33″E
- Country: Russia
- Federal subject: Krasnoyarsk Krai
- Administrative district: Severo-Yeniseysky District

Population (2010 Census)"Численность населения Российской Федерации по муниципальным образованиям на 1 января 2015 года". Archived from the original on September 23, 2015.
  - Total: 1,534
  - Estimate (2013): 1,501 (−2.2%)
- Time zone: UTC+7 (MSK+4)
- Postal code: 663293
- OKTMO ID: 04649000052

Teya (Russian: Те́я) is a rural locality (a settlement) in Severo-Yeniseysky District of Krasnoyarsk Krai, Russia, 705 km northeast of Krasnoyarsk, on the right bank of Teya River, which flows into the river Velmo.

Teya has several shops (7 groceries, 2 industrial stores), a club, a bakery, a local hospital, high school, administration building, a veterinary point, post office, bank, hospital, and a public bath.

The club is a center of cultural life of the village, supporting young talents in the art of singing, dancing. There are held concerts devoted to major holidays.

== Population ==
Population
| 1959 | 1970 | 1979 | 1989 | 2002 | 2007 | 2009 | 2010 | 2012 | 2013 |
| 3330 | 2104 | 2343 | 2428 | 1675 | 1541 | 1524 | 1534 | 1506 | 1501 |

As of 1. 1. 2011 the village population was 1689, of these 853 men, 836 women, 372/441 children. The population is mainly engaged in gold mining (ЦРММ, ЗАО "Полюс", ООО "Соврудник", геологоразведке (Северная ГРЭ)).

== History ==
Status of Teya was urban-type settlement from 1957 to 2013. Since December 5, 2013 its status is a village.

The history of the settlement begins in the early 20th century. Until 1929 it was called Podem (Подъем). In the autumn of 1929 the Teystroy thermal power station was established, serving as a winter settlement. The new town Teystroy (Тейстрой) later has been renamed to Teya. For the construction of the power plant workers were recruited from different parts of the country. Three years later, on 27 May 1932 the power plant was put into operation. Until 1961 the main industry was energy production. With the development of the infrastructure, the village gradually grew up into a small town.

In 1930 a primary school has been founded. In 1935 the school becomes a seven-year, and in 1937 gained the status of the ten-year school. In January 2012 the High School celebrated its 75th anniversary.

In 1946 began the construction of industrial workshops. Since 1964, the North geological expedition started to operate there. Teya was seen the unofficial capital of the exploration area. The North geological expedition, which conducted prospecting and exploration activities throughout the area relocated to the New Erudition (Новая Еруда) location, building production facilities, administrative building, garages, houses. Currently for the North Geological Expedition is working 221 people.

In 1957, Teya has received the status of a village. Since 1999 new housing infrastructure has been built. In 2002, a new brick school building has been commissioned.

== Transportation ==
The МБОУ ССШNo.2 mining facility has an airplane landing site 20 km east of the village (60.385907, 93.049470).

== Climate ==
The climate is continental with long cold winters and short, relatively warm summers. The average January temperature is −31 °C, July 16 °C.

Teya weather:
