= Bolshaya Irba =

Bolshaya Irba Большая Ирба
- Urban-type settlement
- Interactive map of Bolshaya Irba
- Location of Bolshaya Irba Bolshaya Irba (Krasnoyarsk Krai)
- Coordinates: 54.0806°N 92.9311°E
- Country: Russia
- Federal subject: Krasnoyarsk Krai
- Administrative district: Kuraginsky District
- Founded: 1732

Population (2010 Census)
  - Total: 4,464
  - Estimate (2025): 3,382 (−24.2%)
- Time zone: UTC+7 (MSK+4)
- Postal code: 662943
- OKTMO ID: 04630152051

Bolshaya Irba (Russian: Больша́я Ирба́) is an urban locality (an urban-type settlement) in Kuraginsky District of Krasnoyarsk Krai, Russia. Population: 4,464 (2010 census); 5,027 (2002 census); 4,906 (1989 Soviet census).
