= Sayansky District =

Sayansky District Саянский район (Russian)
- District
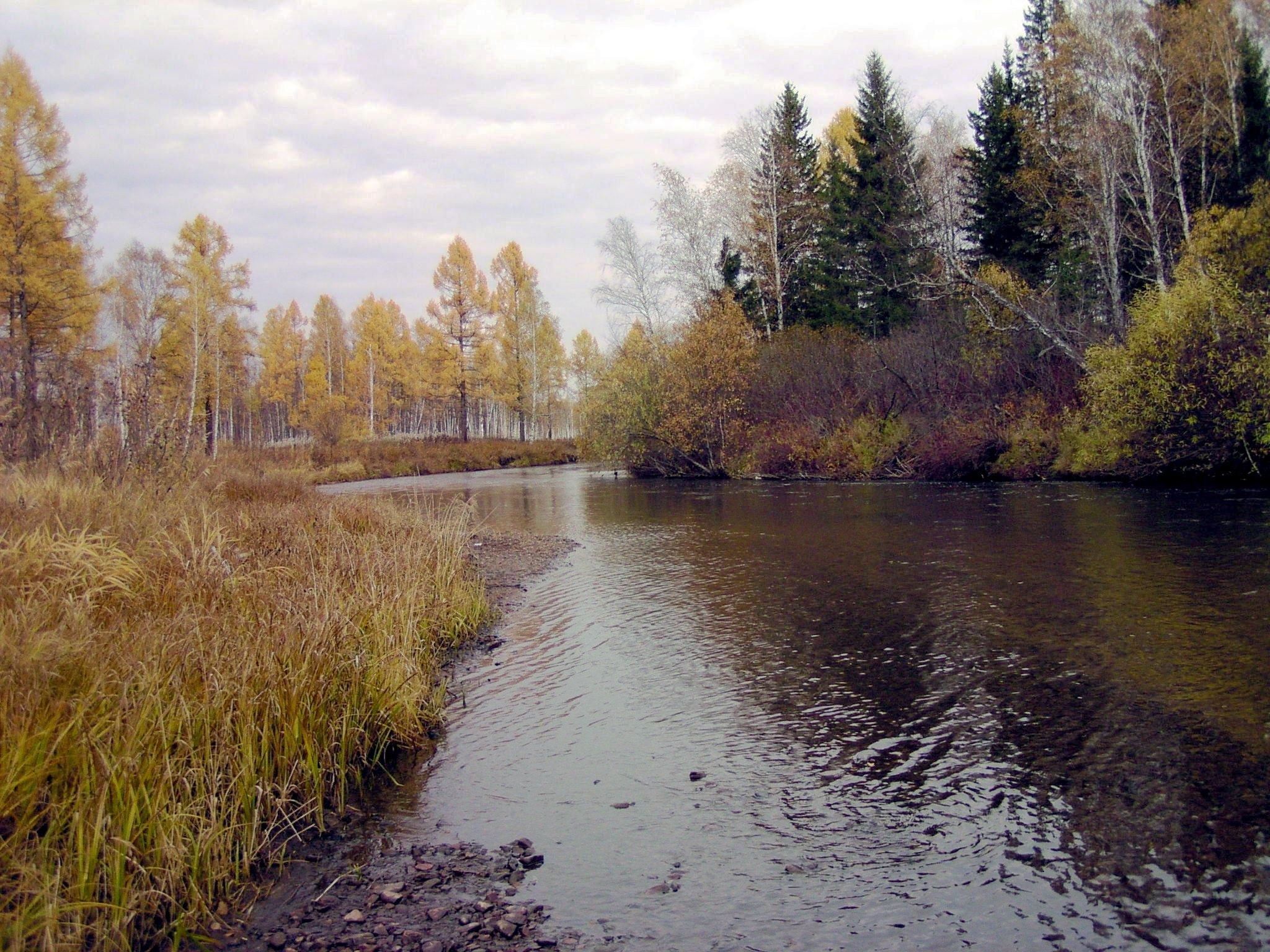
- The Anzha River in Sayansky District

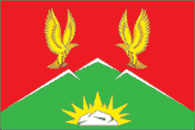
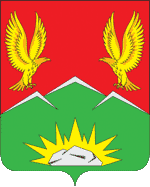
- Flag Coat of arms
- Location of Sayansky District in Krasnoyarsk Krai
- Coordinates: 55°16′N 94°54′E
- Country: Russia
- Federal subject: Krasnoyarsk Krai
- Established: April 4, 1924
- Administrative center: Aginskoye

Government
  - Type: Local government
  - Body: Sayansky District Council of Deputies
  - Head: Igor V. Danilin

Area
  - Total: 8,031 km^{2} (3,101 sq mi)

Population (2010 Census)
  - Total: 12,002
  - Density: 1.494/km^{2} (3.871/sq mi)
  - Urban: 0%
  - Rural: 100%

Administrative structure
  - Administrative divisions: 14 Selsoviets
  - Inhabited localities: 36 rural localities

Municipal structure
  - Municipally incorporated as: Sayansky Municipal District
  - Municipal divisions: 0 urban settlements, 14 rural settlements
- Time zone: UTC+7 (MSK+4)
- OKTMO ID: 04648000
- Website: http://adm-sayany.ru

Population of Sayansky District
- 2010 Census: 12,002
- 2002 Census: 14,542
- 1989 Census: 17,020
- 1979 Census: 16,252

Sayansky District (Russian: Сая́нский райо́н) is an administrative and municipal district (raion), one of the forty-three in Krasnoyarsk Krai, Russia. It is located in the southeast of the krai and borders Rybinsky District in the north, Irbeysky District in the east, Irkutsk Oblast in the southeast, Kuraginsky District in the south, and Partizansky District in the west. The area of the district is 8,031 square kilometers (3,101 sq mi). Its administrative center is the rural locality (a selo) of Aginskoye. As of the 2010 Census, the total population of the district was 12,002, with the population of Aginskoye accounting for 46.5% of that number.

== History ==
The district was founded on April 4, 1924.

== Government ==
As of 2017, the Head of the district is Igor V. Danilin.
