= Mansky District =

Mansky District Манский район (Russian)
- District
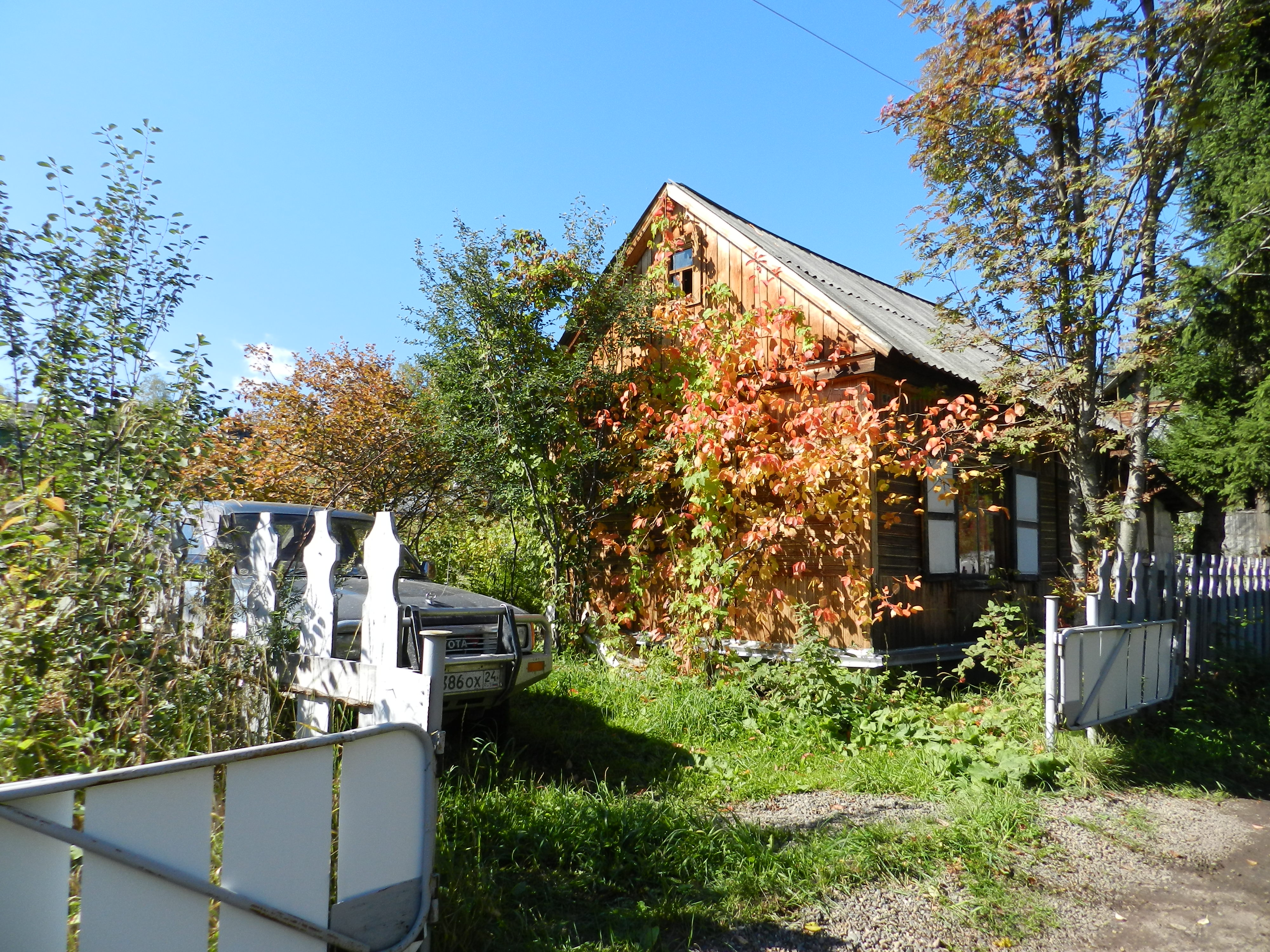
- House in Mansky District

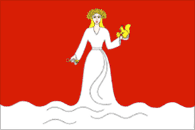
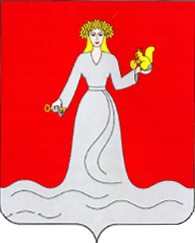
- Flag Coat of arms
- Location of Mansky District in Krasnoyarsk Krai
- Coordinates: 55°43′16″N 93°45′43″E
- Country: Russia
- Federal subject: Krasnoyarsk Krai
- Established: April 4, 1924
- Administrative center: Shalinskoye

Government
  - Type: Local government
  - Body: Mansky District Council of Deputies
  - Head: Sergey V. Belonozhkin

Area
  - Total: 5,976 km^{2} (2,307 sq mi)

Population (2010 Census)
  - Total: 16,077
  - Density: 2.690/km^{2} (6.968/sq mi)
  - Urban: 0%
  - Rural: 100%

Administrative structure
  - Administrative divisions: 11 selsoviet
  - Inhabited localities: 45 rural localities

Municipal structure
  - Municipally incorporated as: Mansky Municipal District
  - Municipal divisions: 0 urban settlements, 11 rural settlements
- Time zone: UTC+7 (MSK+4)
- OKTMO ID: 04631000
- Website: http://www.manaadm.ru

Mansky District (Russian: Ма́нский райо́н) is an administrative and municipal district (raion), one of the forty-three in Krasnoyarsk Krai, Russia. It is located in the south of the krai and borders with Beryozovsky District in the north and northwest, Uyarsky District in the northeast, Partizansky District in the southeast, Kuraginsky District in the south, and with Balakhtinsky District in the southwest. The area of the district is 5,976 square kilometers (2,307 sq mi). Its administrative center is the rural locality (a selo) of Shalinskoye. Population: 16,077 (2010 census); 18,618 (2002 Census); 21,888 (1989 Soviet census). The population of Shalinskoye accounts for 24.5% of the district's total population.

== Geography ==
Mansky District is situated in the Mana River valley. It stretches for 197 kilometers (122 mi) from north to south.

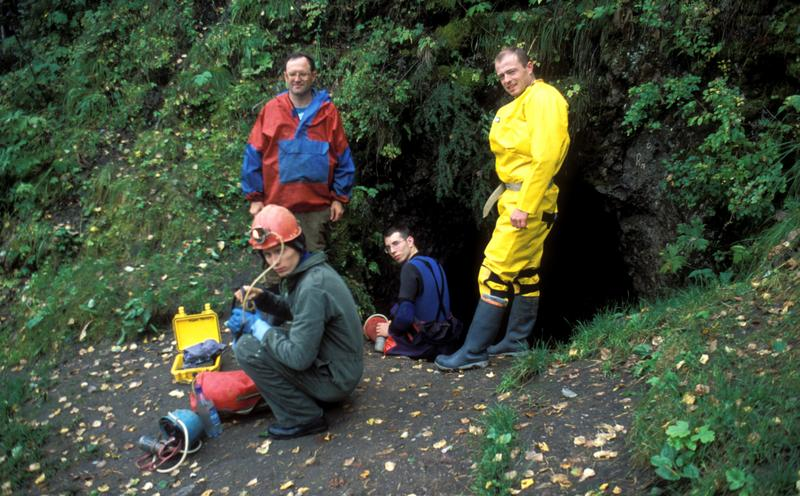
Entrance to Bolshaya Oreshnaya Cave

Bolshaya Oreshnaya Cave, the second longest-stretching cave in Russia, is located on the district's territory. Other notable caves include Tyomnaya, Ledyanaya, Belaya, and Medvezhya, which are a part of the Badzheyskiye Caves nature sanctuary of regional importance—a protected area of inanimate nature and a habitat of rare species.

== History ==
The district was founded on April 4, 1924.

== Divisions and government ==
As of 2013, the Head of the district and the Chairman of the District Council is Sergey V. Belonozhkin.
