= Dzerzhinskoye, Krasnoyarsk Krai =

Rural locality in Krasnoyarsk Krai, Russia

Coordinates: 56°49′42″N 95°13′35″E

Flag of Dzerzhinskoye

Coat of arms of Dzerzhinskoye

Dzerzhinskoye (Russian: Дзержи́нское) is a rural locality (a selo) and the administrative center of Dzerzhinsky District, Krasnoyarsk Krai, Russia. Population: 7,374 (2010 census); 7,898 (2002 census); 9,329 (1989 Soviet census).
