= Novochernorechensky =

Novochernorechensky Новочернореченский
- Urban-type settlement
- Interactive map of Novochernorechensky
- Location of Novochernorechensky Novochernorechensky (Krasnoyarsk Krai)
- Coordinates: 56.2684°N 91.0886°E
- Country: Russia
- Federal subject: Krasnoyarsk Krai
- Administrative district: Kozulsky District

Population (2010 Census)
  - Total: 3,802
  - Estimate (2017): 3,823 (+0.6%)
- Time zone: UTC+7 (MSK+4)
- Postal code: 662040
- OKTMO ID: 04626154051

Novochernorechensky (Russian: Новочерноре́ченский) is an urban locality (an urban-type settlement) in Kozulsky District of Krasnoyarsk Krai, Russia. Its population was 3,802 (2010 census); , 3,781 (2002 census); and 4,451 (1989 Soviet census).
