= Rybinsky District, Krasnoyarsk Krai =

Rybinsky District Рыбинский район (Russian)
- District
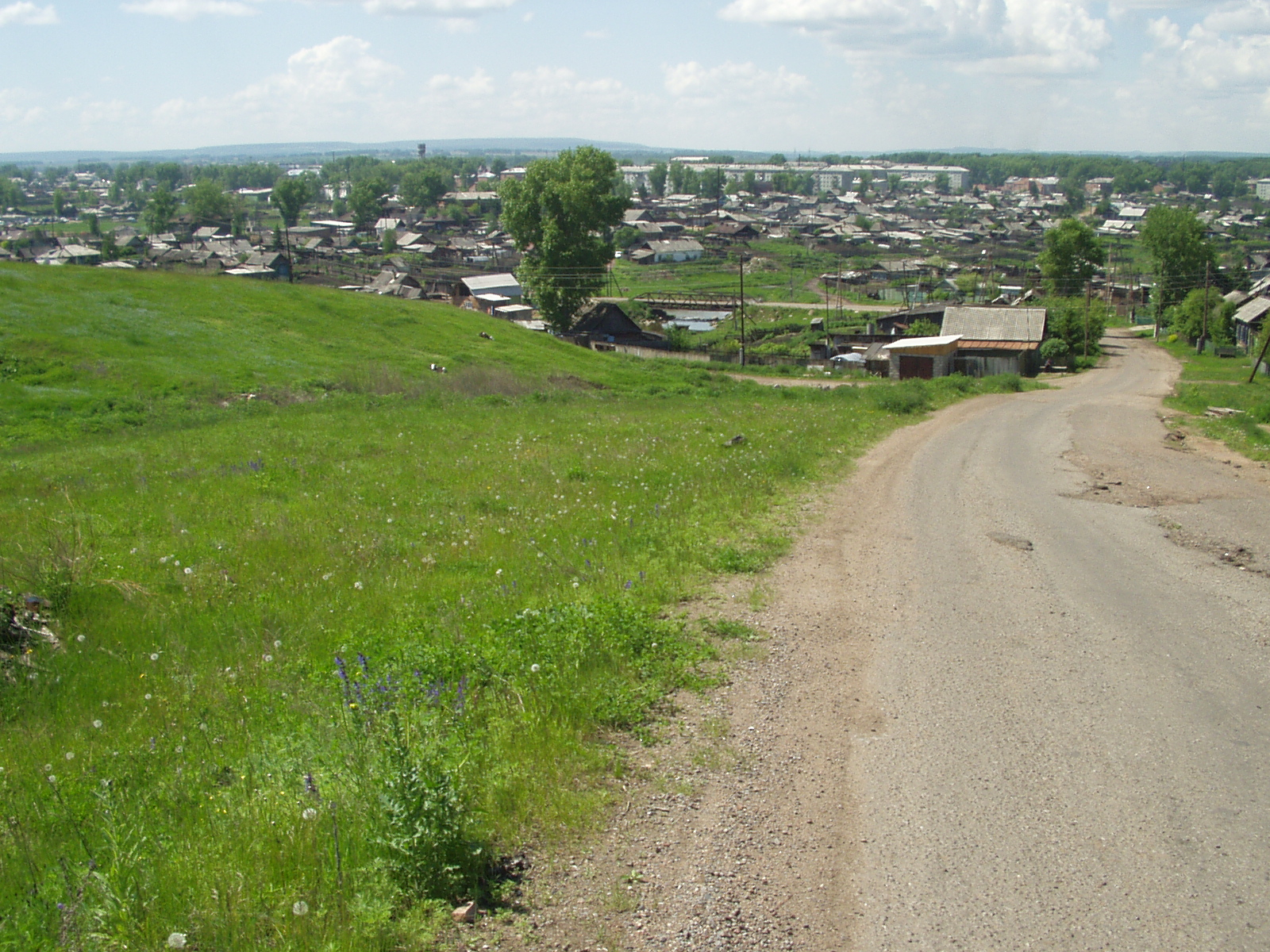
- View of Zaozyorny, in Rybinsky District

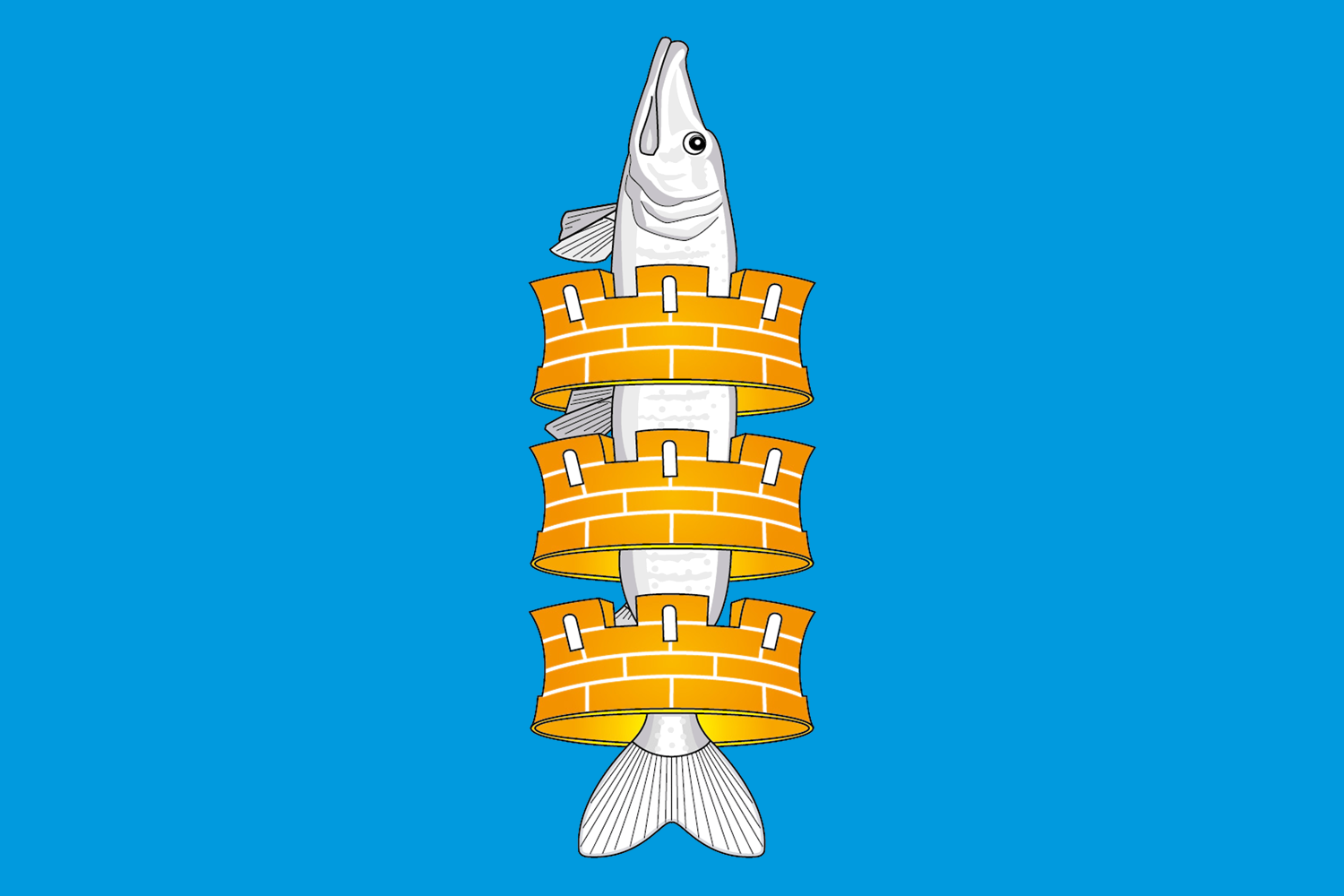
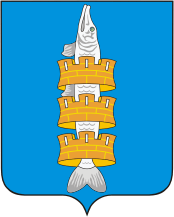
- Flag Coat of arms
- Location of Rybinsky District in Krasnoyarsk Krai
- Coordinates: 55°58′N 94°42′E
- Country: Russia
- Federal subject: Krasnoyarsk Krai
- Established: April 4, 1924
- Administrative center: Zaozyorny

Government
  - Type: Local government
  - Body: Rybinsky District Council of Deputies
  - Head: Sergey M. Kolesov

Area
  - Total: 3,506 km^{2} (1,354 sq mi)

Population (2010 Census)
  - Total: 31,941
  - Density: 9.110/km^{2} (23.60/sq mi)
  - Urban: 55.7%
  - Rural: 44.3%

Administrative structure
  - Administrative divisions: 1 District towns, 2 Urban-type settlements, 14 Selsoviets
  - Inhabited localities: 1 cities/towns, 2 urban-type settlements, 48 rural localities

Municipal structure
  - Municipally incorporated as: Rybinsky Municipal District
  - Municipal divisions: 3 urban settlements, 14 rural settlements
- Time zone: UTC+7 (MSK+4)
- OKTMO ID: 04647000
- Website: http://www.rybynskiy.ru/

Rybinsky District (Russian: Ры́бинский райо́н) is an administrative and municipal district (raion), one of the forty-three in Krasnoyarsk Krai, Russia. It is located in the southeast of the krai and borders with Kansky District in the northeast, Irbeysky District in the southeast, Sayansky District in the south, Partizansky District in the southwest, Uyarsky District in the west, and with Sukhobuzimsky District in the northwest. The area of the district is 3,506 square kilometers (1,354 sq mi). Its administrative center is the town of Zaozyorny. Population: 31,954 (2010 census); 21,186 (2002 Census); 23,294 (1989 Soviet census). The population of Zaozyorny accounts for 33.4% of the district's total population.

== Geography ==
The Kan River flows through the district.

== History ==
The district was founded on April 4, 1924.

== Government ==
As of 2013, the Head of the district and the Chairman of the District Council is Sergey M. Kolesov.
