= Sharypovsky District =

Sharypovsky District Шарыповский район (Russian)
- District
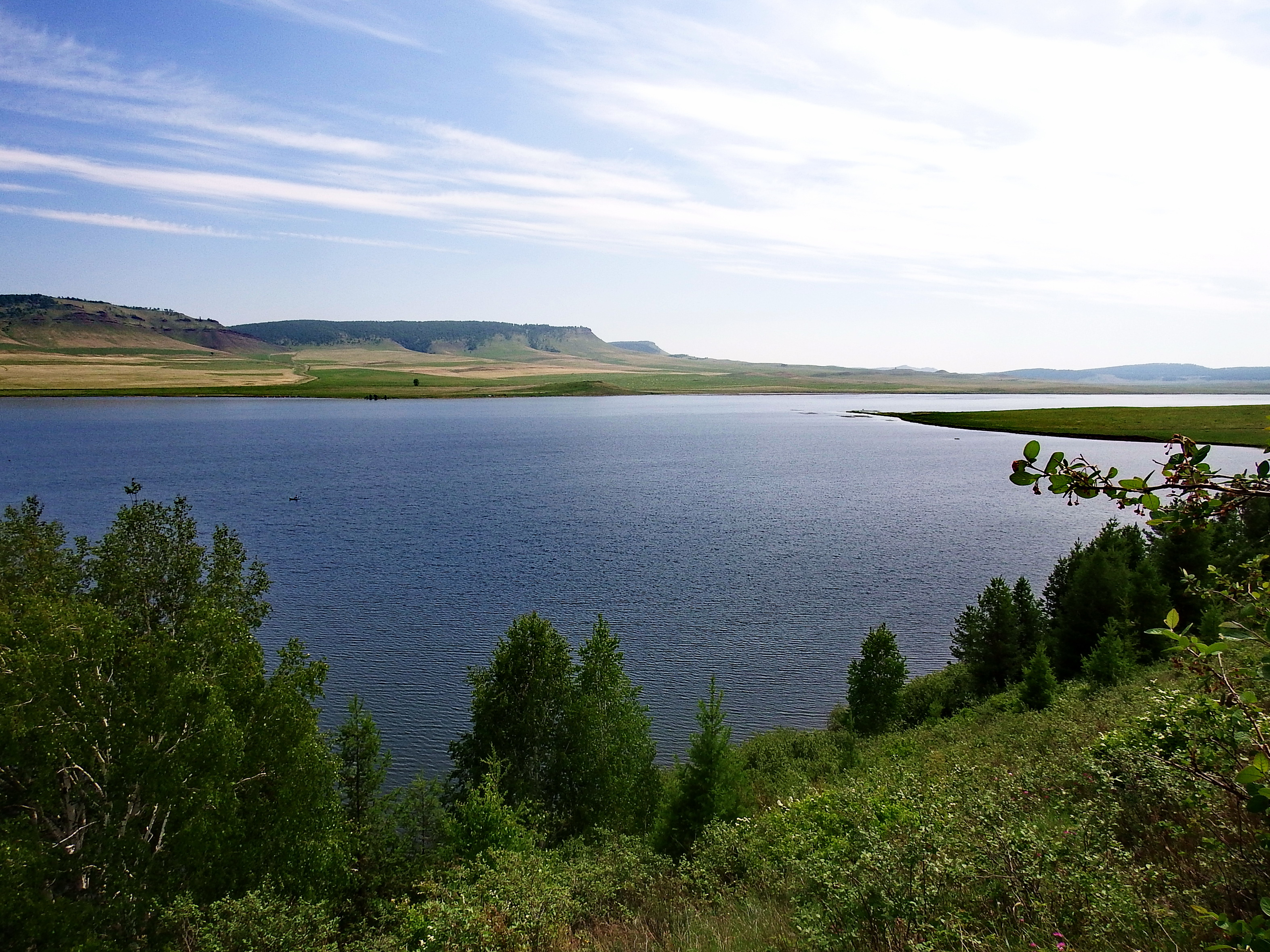
- Lake Maloye in Sharpypovsky District

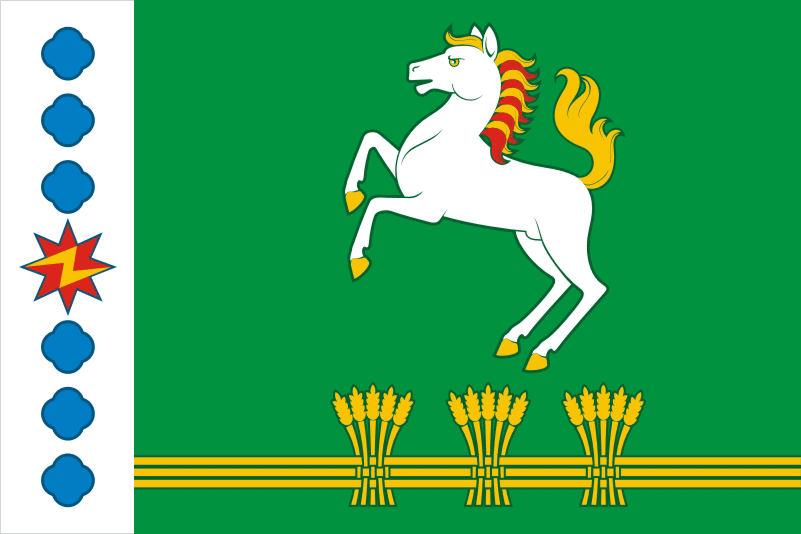
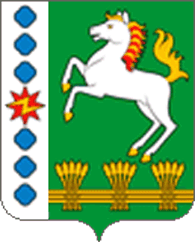
- Flag Coat of arms
- Location of Sharypovsky District in Krasnoyarsk Krai
- Coordinates: 55°32′N 89°12′E
- Country: Russia
- Federal subject: Krasnoyarsk Krai
- Established: July 2, 1940
- Administrative center: Sharypovo

Government
  - Type: Local government
  - Body: Sharypovsky District Council of Deputies
  - Head: Gennady V. Kachayev

Area
  - Total: 3,751 km^{2} (1,448 sq mi)

Population (2010 Census)
  - Total: 15,109
  - Density: 4.028/km^{2} (10.43/sq mi)
  - Urban: 0%
  - Rural: 100%

Administrative structure
  - Administrative divisions: 7 selsoviet
  - Inhabited localities: 40 rural localities

Municipal structure
  - Municipally incorporated as: Sharypovsky Municipal District
  - Municipal divisions: 0 urban settlements, 7 rural settlements
- Time zone: UTC+7 (MSK+4)
- OKTMO ID: 04558000
- Website: https://www.shr24.ru/

Sharypovsky District (Russian: Шары́повский райо́н) is an administrative and municipal district (raion), one of the forty-three districts in Krasnoyarsk Krai, Russia. It is located in the southwest of the krai and borders with Bogotolsky District in the north, Nazarovsky and Uzhursky Districts in the east, the Republic of Khakassia in the south and southwest, and with Kemerovo Oblast in the west and northwest. The area of the district is 3,751 square kilometers (1,448 sq mi). Its administrative center is the town of Sharypovo (which is not administratively a part of the district). Population: 15,109 (2010 census); 17,775 (2002 census); 16,259 (1989 Soviet census).

== History ==
The district was founded on July 2, 1940.

== Administrative and municipal status ==
Within the framework of administrative divisions, Sharypovsky District is one of the forty-three in the krai. The town of Sharypovo serves as its administrative center, despite being incorporated separately as a krai town—an administrative unit with the status equal to that of the districts. The district is divided into seven selsoviets.

As a municipal division, the district is incorporated as Sharypovsky Municipal District and is divided into seven rural settlements (corresponding to the administrative district's selsoviets). The krai town of Sharypovo is incorporated separately from the district as Sharypovo Urban Okrug.

== Paleontology ==
A species Sineleutherus issedonicus was described by A. O. Averianov, A. V. Lopatin and S. A. Krasnolutskii in 2011. It lived in what is now Sharypovsky District (Krasnoyarsk Krai, Russia) during the middle Jurassic (Bathonian age); its fossils were collected from the upper part of the Itat Formation.
