= Kuragino, Krasnoyarsk Krai =

Russian urban locality

Kuragino Курагино
- Urban-type settlement
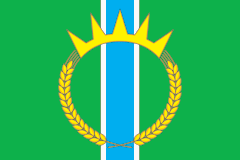
- Flag
- Interactive map of Kuragino
- Location of Kuragino Kuragino (Krasnoyarsk Krai)
- Coordinates: 53.8879°N 92.6824°E
- Country: Russia
- Federal subject: Krasnoyarsk Krai
- Administrative district: Kuraginsky District
- Founded: 1626

Population (2010 Census)
  - Total: 13,743
  - Estimate (2025): 11,581 (−15.7%)
- Time zone: UTC+7 (MSK+4)
- Postal code: 662910
- OKTMO ID: 04630151051

Kuragino (Russian: Кура́гино) is an urban locality (an urban-type settlement) in Kuraginsky District of Krasnoyarsk Krai, Russia. Population: 13,743 (2010 census); 14,298 (2002 census); 14,351 (1989 Soviet census).

== Industry ==
from 1901 to 1917, there was a Burykin distillery in the village, now located near the village in the form of ruins and remnants of brick walls.
