= Goryachegorsk =

Goryachegorsk Горячегорск
- Urban-type settlement
- Interactive map of Goryachegorsk
- Location of Goryachegorsk Goryachegorsk (Krasnoyarsk Krai)
- Coordinates: 55.4042°N 88.9146°E
- Country: Russia
- Federal subject: Krasnoyarsk Krai

Population (2010 Census)
  - Total: 756
  - Estimate (2025): 379 (−49.9%)
- Time zone: UTC+7 (MSK+4)
- Postal code: 662324
- OKTMO ID: 04740000056

Goryachegorsk (Russian: Горячего́рск) is an urban locality (an urban-type settlement) in Krasnoyarsk Krai, Russia. Population: 756 (2010 census); 887 (2002 census); 1,112 (1989 Soviet census).
