= Kuraginsky District =

Kuraginsky District Курагинский район (Russian)
- District
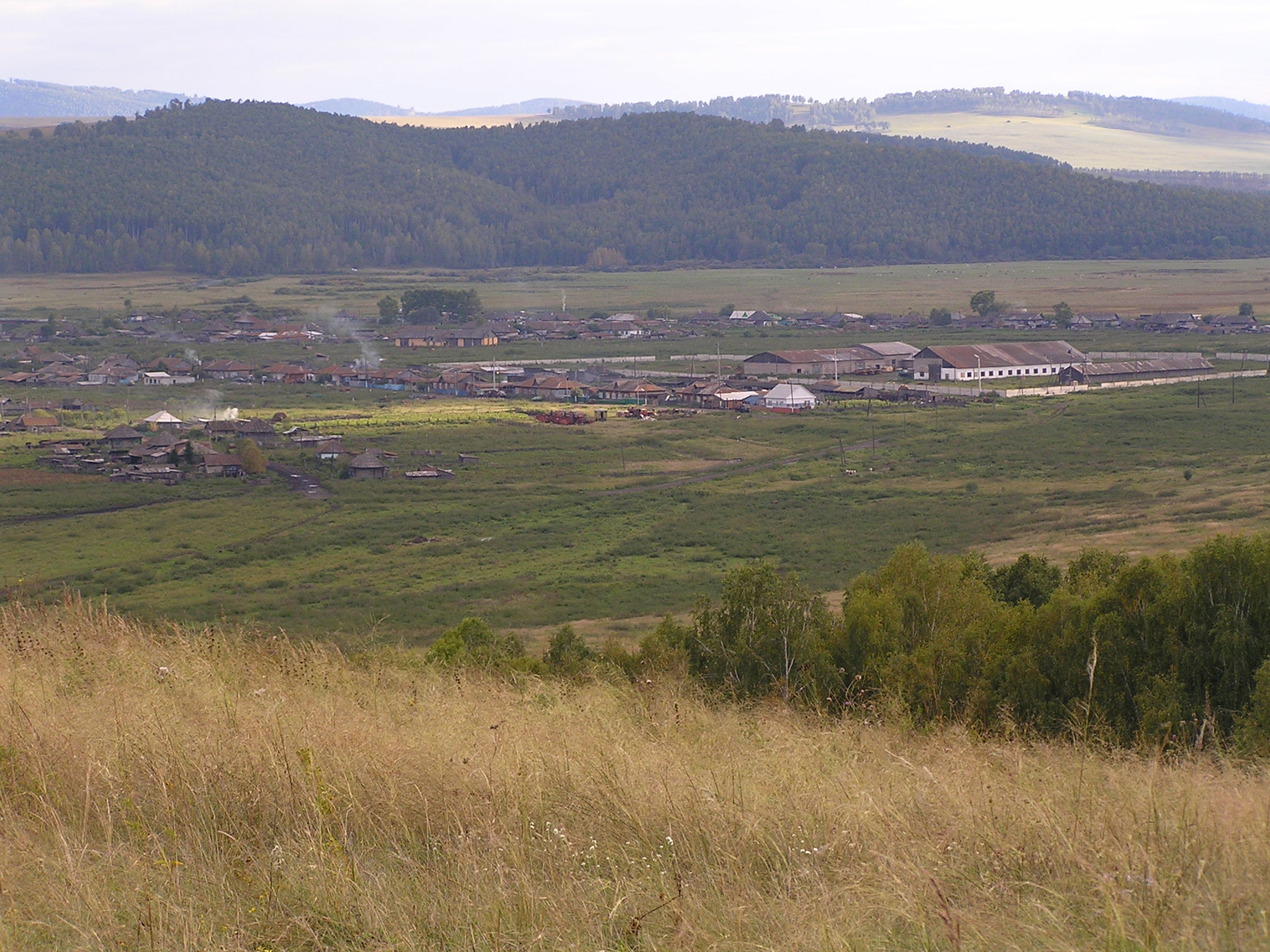
- Landscape in Kuraginsky District

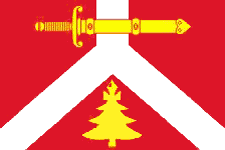
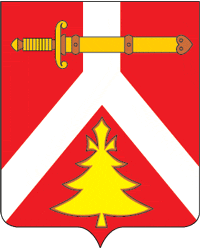
- Flag Coat of arms
- Location of Kuraginsky District in Krasnoyarsk Krai
- Coordinates: 53°53′51″N 92°40′21″E
- Country: Russia
- Federal subject: Krasnoyarsk Krai
- Established: April 4, 1924
- Administrative center: Kuragino

Government
  - Type: Local government
  - Body: Kuraginsky District Council of Deputies
  - Head: Yevgeny D. Dmitriyev

Area
  - Total: 24,073 km^{2} (9,295 sq mi)

Population (2010 Census)
  - Total: 47,690
  - Density: 1.981/km^{2} (5.131/sq mi)
  - Urban: 60.3%
  - Rural: 39.7%

Administrative structure
  - Administrative divisions: 1 District towns, 4 Urban-type settlements, 17 Selsoviets
  - Inhabited localities: 1 cities/towns, 4 urban-type settlements, 63 rural localities

Municipal structure
  - Municipally incorporated as: Kuraginsky Municipal District
  - Municipal divisions: 5 urban settlements, 17 rural settlements
- Time zone: UTC+7 (MSK+4)
- OKTMO ID: 04630000
- Website: http://www.kuragino-krsn.ru/

Kuraginsky District (Russian: Кура́гинский райо́н) is an administrative and municipal district (raion), one of the forty-three in Krasnoyarsk Krai, Russia. It is located in the southeast of the krai and borders with Balakhtinsky, Mansky, Partizansky, and Sayansky Districts in the north, Nizhneudinsky District of Irkutsk Oblast in the northeast, Todzhinsky District of the Tuva Republic in the southeast, Karatuzsky District in the south, Minusinsky District in the southwest, Krasnoturansky District in the west, and with Idrinsky Districts in the northwest. The area of the district is 24,073 square kilometers (9,295 sq mi). Its administrative center is the urban locality (an urban-type settlement) of Kuragino. Population: 47,690 (2010 census); 51,873 (2002 Census); 54,337 (1989 Soviet census). The population of Kuragino accounts for 28.8% of the district's total population.

== Geography ==
Kuraginsky District is the largest in terms of area in the south of Krasnoyarsk Krai. It stretches for 400 kilometers (250 mi) from west to east. It is located in the Eastern Sayan mountainous area, which includes Grandiozny Peak, the highest point of Krasnoyarsk Krai.

Climate in the district is strongly continental. Tourist attractions include the Kinzelyuk Waterfall, one of the highest in Russia.

== History ==
The district was founded on April 4, 1924.

== Government ==
As of 2013, the Head of the district and the Chairman of the District Council is Yevgeny D. Dmitriyev.

== Economy ==
The district is a raw-material base for the metallurgical, food-processing, and timber industries.

=== Transportation ===
The Abakan-Tayshet railway passes through the district. The total length of the auto roads in the district is 641 kilometers (398 mi), of which 257.9 kilometers (160.3 mi) are hard-surface roads.

== Culture ==
There are thirty-nine clubs, two museums, thirty-six public libraries (with the total book stock numbering ~367,000 volumes), and three music schools.

== Education ==
Thirty-six educational facilities are located in the district.

== Public health services ==
There is one hospital, as well as four clinics. There are on average 1.23 medical workers per 1,000 people.
