= Kan (river) =

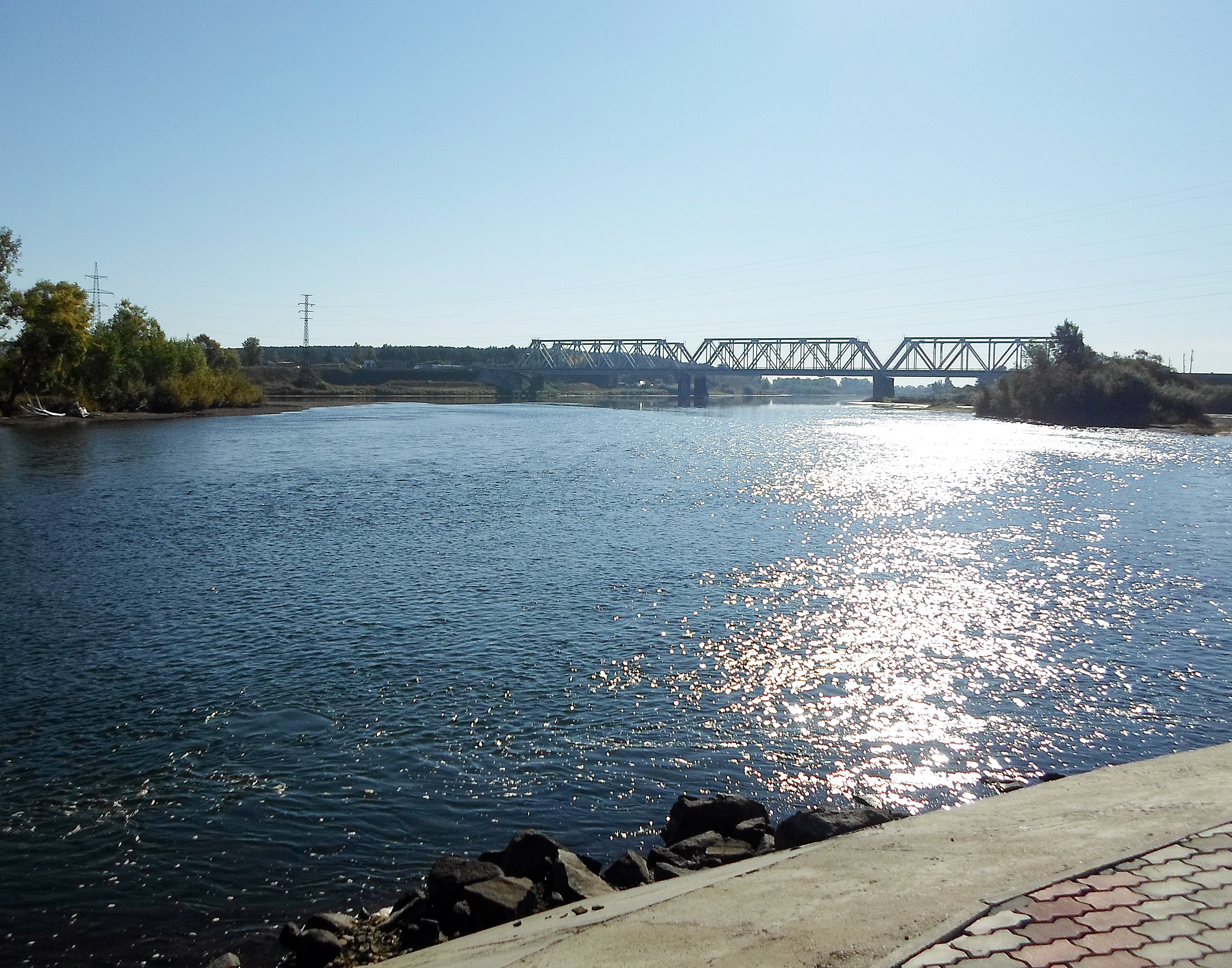

Location
- Country: Russia

Physical characteristics
- Mouth: Yenisey
  - coordinates: 56.512°N 93.791°E
- Length: 629 km (391 mi)
- Basin size: 36,900 km^{2} (14,200 sq mi)

Basin features
- Progression: Yenisey→ Kara Sea

The Kan (Russian: Кан) river is a right tributary of the Yenisey in Krasnoyarsk Krai, Siberia, Russia. It is 629-kilometre (391 mi) long and drains a basin of 36,900 square kilometres (14,200 mi^{2}). Its valley forms the southern boundary of the Yenisey Range.

== Course ==
The headwaters of the river rise in the Sayan Mountains and flow from there in a northerly direction through Kansk and then in a westerly direction through Zelenogorsk, entering Yenisei at Ust-Kan, 69 kilometres (43 mi) north-east of Krasnoyarsk.

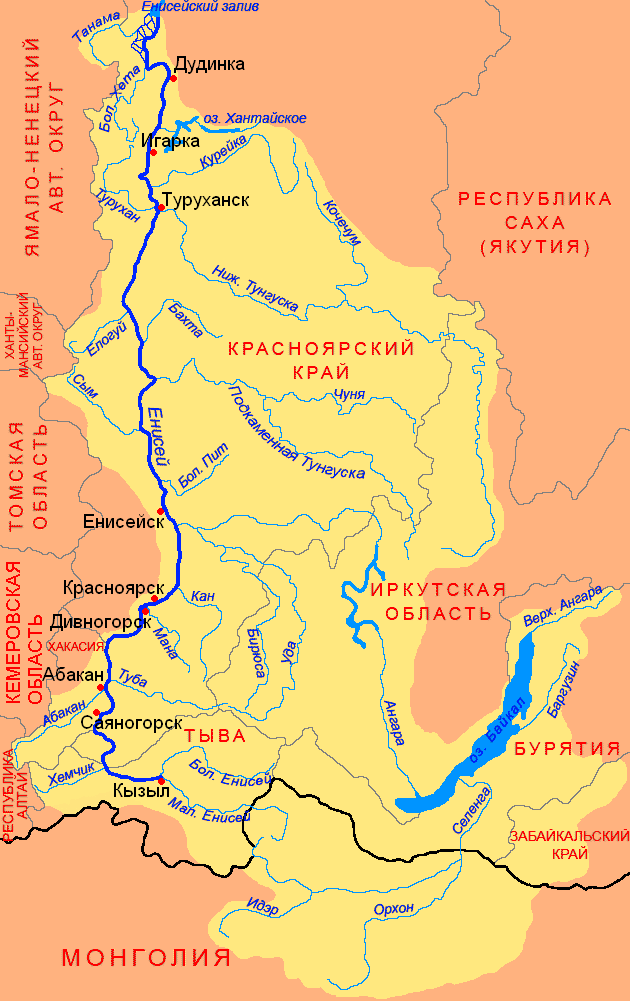
Basin of the Yenisei

== See also ==
- List of rivers of Russia

== Notes ==
- Material translated from the Russian Wikipedia article.
