= Strelka (inhabited locality) =

Strelka (Russian: Стрелка) is the name of several inhabited localities in Russia.

== Modern localities ==
Urban localities

- Strelka, Lesosibirsk, Krasnoyarsk Krai, a work settlement under the administrative jurisdiction of the krai town of Lesosibirsk in Krasnoyarsk Krai

Rural localities

- Strelka, Amur Oblast, a settlement in Solovyevsky Rural Settlement of Tyndinsky District in Amur Oblast
- Strelka, Shenkursky District, Arkhangelsk Oblast, a settlement in Shakhanovsky Selsoviet of Shenkursky District in Arkhangelsk Oblast
- Strelka, Velsky District, Arkhangelsk Oblast, a village in Puysky Selsoviet of Velsky District in Arkhangelsk Oblast
- Strelka, Puchezhsky District, Ivanovo Oblast, a village in Puchezhsky District of Ivanovo Oblast
- Strelka, Vichugsky District, Ivanovo Oblast, a village in Vichugsky District of Ivanovo Oblast
- Strelka, Krasnodar Krai, a settlement in Krasnostrelsky Rural Okrug of Temryuksky District in Krasnodar Krai; 45°13′N 37°17′E
- Strelka, Irbeysky District, Krasnoyarsk Krai, a village in Blagoveshchensky Selsoviet of Irbeysky District in Krasnoyarsk Krai
- Strelka, Semyonov, Nizhny Novgorod Oblast, a village in Belasovsky Selsoviet under the administrative jurisdiction of the town of oblast significance of Semyonov in Nizhny Novgorod Oblast
- Strelka, Vyksa, Nizhny Novgorod Oblast, a settlement under the administrative jurisdiction of Shimorskoye Work Settlement under the administrative jurisdiction of the town of oblast significance of Vyksa in Nizhny Novgorod Oblast
- Strelka, Chkalovsky District, Nizhny Novgorod Oblast, a village in Kotelnitsky Selsoviet of Chkalovsky District in Nizhny Novgorod Oblast
- Strelka, Gaginsky District, Nizhny Novgorod Oblast, a settlement in Vetoshkinsky Selsoviet of Gaginsky District in Nizhny Novgorod Oblast
- Strelka, Smolkovsky Selsoviet, Gorodetsky District, Nizhny Novgorod Oblast, a village in Smolkovsky Selsoviet of Gorodetsky District in Nizhny Novgorod Oblast
- Strelka, Zinyakovsky Selsoviet, Gorodetsky District, Nizhny Novgorod Oblast, a village in Zinyakovsky Selsoviet of Gorodetsky District in Nizhny Novgorod Oblast
- Strelka, Lyskovsky District, Nizhny Novgorod Oblast, a village in Lenkovsky Selsoviet of Lyskovsky District in Nizhny Novgorod Oblast
- Strelka, Sechenovsky District, Nizhny Novgorod Oblast, a village in Verkhnetalyzinsky Selsoviet of Sechenovsky District in Nizhny Novgorod Oblast
- Strelka (selo), Sokolsky District, Nizhny Novgorod Oblast, a selo in Loyminsky Selsoviet of Sokolsky District in Nizhny Novgorod Oblast
- Strelka (village), Sokolsky District, Nizhny Novgorod Oblast, a village in Loyminsky Selsoviet of Sokolsky District in Nizhny Novgorod Oblast
- Strelka, Vadsky District, Nizhny Novgorod Oblast, a selo in Strelsky Selsoviet of Vadsky District in Nizhny Novgorod Oblast
- Strelka, Borovichsky District, Novgorod Oblast, a village in Opechenskoye Settlement of Borovichsky District in Novgorod Oblast
- Strelka, Novgorodsky District, Novgorod Oblast, a village in Trubichinskoye Settlement of Novgorodsky District in Novgorod Oblast
- Strelka, Oryol Oblast, a village in Russko-Brodsky Selsoviet of Verkhovsky District in Oryol Oblast
- Strelka, Perm Krai, a village in Kishertsky District of Perm Krai
- Strelka, Tambov Oblast, a village in Alexandrovsky Selsoviet of Mordovsky District in Tambov Oblast
- Strelka, Tver Oblast, a village in Likhachevskoye Rural Settlement of Krasnokholmsky District in Tver Oblast
- Strelka, Vologda Oblast, a village in Vostrovsky Selsoviet of Nyuksensky District in Vologda Oblast
- Strelka, Voronezh Oblast, a khutor in Nizhneikoretskoye Rural Settlement of Liskinsky District in Voronezh Oblast
- Strelka, Yaroslavl Oblast, a village in Voshchazhnikovsky Rural Okrug of Borisoglebsky District in Yaroslavl Oblast

== Alternative names ==
- Strelka, alternative name of Bolshaya Strelka, a village in Vlasovskoye Settlement of Oktyabrsky District in Kostroma Oblast; 52°46′N 46°47′E
