= Strelka =

Strelka may refer to:

== Places ==
- Strelka (inhabited locality), several inhabited localities in Russia including:
  - Strelka, Amur Oblast
  - Strelka, Lesosibirsk, Krasnoyarsk Krai
  - Strelka, Vologda Oblast
  - Strelka, Voronezh Oblast
- a small cape at the confluence of the Volga and Kotorosl Rivers in Yaroslavl, Russia

== People ==
- Andrew Strelka (born 1980), American attorney

== Other uses ==
- Strelka (chess engine), a Russian chess engine
- Strelka (Nizhny Novgorod Metro), a metro station in Nizhny Novgorod, Russia
- Strelka Institute, Moscow
- Strelka, Soviet space dog
- the easternmost tip of Vasilyevsky Island in St. Petersburg, Russia
