= Sosnovoborsk =

Sosnovoborsk (Russian: Сосновобо́рск) is the name of several urban localities in Russia:

- Sosnovoborsk, Krasnoyarsk Krai, a town in Krasnoyarsk Krai; administratively incorporated as a krai city
- Sosnovoborsk, Penza Oblast, a work settlement in Sosnovoborsky District of Penza Oblast
