= Sosnovoborsky =

Sosnovoborsky (masculine), Sosnovoborskaya (feminine), or Sosnovoborskoye (neuter) may refer to:

- Sosnovoborsky District, a district of Penza Oblast, Russia
- Sosnovoborsky Municipal Formation with Urban Okrug Status, the administrative division which the town of Sosnovy Bor, Leningrad Oblast, Russia, is incorporated as
  - Sosnovoborsky Urban Okrug, the municipal formation corresponding to that administrative division
- Sosnovoborskoye, a rural locality (a selo) in Saratov Oblast, Russia

== See also ==
- Sosnovoborsk
- Sosnovy Bor
