= Bogotolsky =

Bogotolsky (masculine), Bogotolskaya (feminine), or Bogotolskoye (neuter) may refer to:

- Bogotolsky District, a district of Krasnoyarsk Krai, Russia
- Bogotolsky (rural locality), a rural locality (a settlement) in Novosibirsk Oblast, Russia
