= Dodonovo =

Dodonovo Додоново
- village
- Location of Dodonovo
- Location of Dodonovo Dodonovo (Krasnoyarsk Krai)
- Coordinates: 56°16′16″N 93°26′00″E
- Country: Russia
- Federal subject: Krasnoyarsk Krai

Population (2010 Census)
  - Total: 415
- Time zone: UTC+7 (MSK+4)
- Postal code(s): 662974
- OKTMO ID: 04735000116

Dodonovo (Russian: Додо́ново) is a village near Zheleznogorsk, Krasnoyarsk Krai. It was founded in 1949. In 1950-1960 there lived builders of the city and their families. People in Dodonovo speaks Central Russian dialects.
