= Podgorny, Zheleznogorsk, Krasnoyarsk Krai =

Podgorny Подгорный
- Urban-type settlement
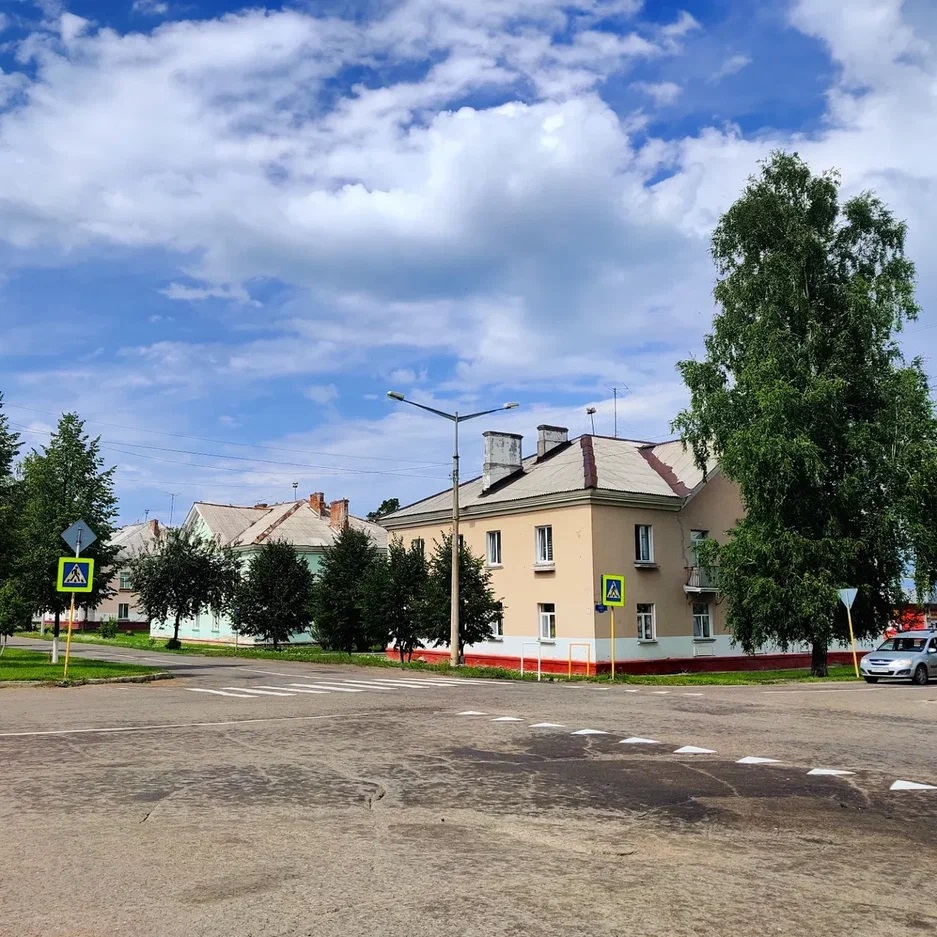
- Подгорный общий вид.jpg
- Interactive map of Podgorny
- Location of Podgorny Podgorny (Krasnoyarsk Krai)
- Coordinates: 56°7′19″N 93°25′39″E
- Country: Russia
- Federal subject: Krasnoyarsk Krai
- Founded: 1953

Population (2010 Census)
  - Total: 6,760
  - Estimate (2025): 5,327 (−21.2%)
- Time zone: UTC+7 (MSK+4)
- Postal code: 662991
- OKTMO ID: 04735000056

Podgorny (Russian: Подго́рный) is an urban locality (an urban-type settlement) under the administrative jurisdiction of the closed town of Zheleznogorsk in Krasnoyarsk Krai, Russia. Population: 6,760 (2010 census); 6,164 (2002 census); It is located 30 km northeast of Krasnoyarsk and 5 km east of Sosnovoborsk on the right bank of the Yenisei River. The territory of the village is 7 square meters. km. Podgorny is a part of Krasnoyarsk metro area.

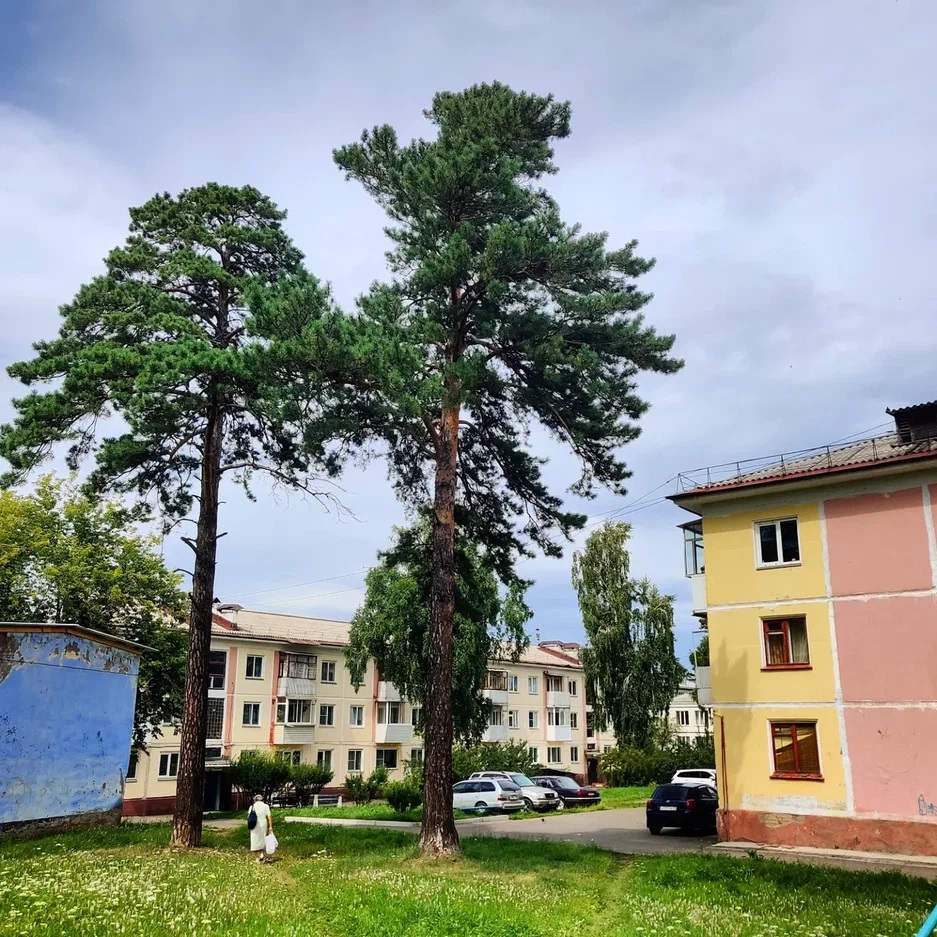
Apartment blocks in Podgorny

== History ==
In the spring of 1953, the construction of a special facility began by military personnel (the so-called "aviators"). A road from the highway was laid 5 km from Krasnoyarsk-26 near the villages of Novy Put and Belorussovka. On the site of the fourth district, it was supposed to build a hangar storage for aerial bombs and shells in the mountain; mailbox 70 was the customer for the construction.

In 1954, the construction of residential quarters of the village began. In January 1955, the area was surrounded by barbed wire. The 4th industrial region was a quarantine, transit base for the military builders of Krasnoyarsk-26. In 1956, Komsomol members who arrived on vouchers settled in the barracks.

In 1958, the construction of a special chemical plant facility began, which will be included in the defense complex of the mining and chemical plant and Krasmash. The main object of construction was a stand for testing rocket engines. Military builders and Komsomol members built new infrastructure in the taiga: roads, energy, warehouses for rocket fuel components, treatment facilities, an air separation complex to produce nitrogen, oxygen, argon, and many other facilities. Construction lasted 3 years.

On December 31, 1961, the main production was put into operation. From 1961 to 1990, the plant carried out defense orders. In 1968, a dam was built on the Tartat River, the Tartat Reservoir was formed, a favorite vacation spot for the villagers. In 1979, an ice sports palace was built. Since 1980, the Fakel recreation center has been operating as a pioneer and sports camp. In 1984, the construction of a swimming pool and a gym was completed.

In 1988, the production of blocks for refrigerators was placed at the plant. In 1990, as part of a planned conversion, facilities for the disposal of SLBMs and instrument compartments were placed. Since 1998, work has been underway on the construction of catalytic hydrogenation of rocket fuel under a contract with the United States. In 2001, the chemical plant was reformed, several organizations were created on its basis. On July 1, 2008, restrictions on entry into the town were lifted. The regime zone remained only around the chemical plant.

== Population ==
Historical populations
Year	Pop.	±%
2002	6,164	—
2009	6,161	−0.0%
2010	6,760	+9.7%
2012	6,743	−0.3%
2013	6,676	−1.0%
2014	6,587	−1.3%
2015	6,558	−0.4%
2016	6,536	−0.3%
2017	6,541	+0.1%
2018	6,506	−0.5%
2020	6,376	−2.0%
2021	6,371	−0.1%

The age composition is dominated by middle-aged and older people. The average age of the residents of the village is 47 years. Younger people tend to move to Krasnoyarsk.

The village has a general education school, an art school, 3 kindergartens, the Fakel sports complex, the Start cultural center, a chain of stores, and the Church of the Resurrection of Christ.

The city-forming enterprise is a chemical plant, workshops of the State Enterprise "Krasnoyarsk Machine-Building Plant". More than 30% of the population works there.

== Climate ==
The climate is continental. Steady snow cover from November to March. Average January temperature: -21.6 °C, July: +21.5 °C. Summer lasts from the end of May to the last week of August. Demi-season: spring, autumn lasting 1.5–2 months. Snow cover is stable, above 20 cm. Maximum level in March: 55 cm. Most precipitation in the form of rain falls from late July to October

== Flora and fauna ==
The predominant vegetation is coniferous trees: larch, pine, spruce; hardwoods: birch, aspen, bird cherry, sorbus, wild rose; acclimatized: maple, poplus, wild apple. Birds: crows, sparrows, tits, different types of woodpeckers, kites, pigeons, nuthatches. Fauna: mixed representatives of the taiga fauna of central Siberia and the south of the Krasnoyarsk Territory: brown bear, hare, roe deer, wolves, foxes, squirrels, chipmunks, ferrets, moles, ground squirrels, voles.
