= Nazarovsky =

Nazarovsky (masculine), Nazarovskaya (feminine), or Nazarovskoye (neuter) may refer to:

- Nazarovsky District, a district of Krasnoyarsk Krai, Russia
- Nazarovsky (rural locality), a rural locality (a khutor) in Rostov Oblast, Russia
