= Nazarovo, Krasnoyarsk Krai =

Town in Krasnoyarsk Krai, Russia

Nazarovo Назарово
- Town
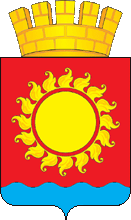
- Flag Coat of arms
- Interactive map of Nazarovo
- Location of Nazarovo Nazarovo (Krasnoyarsk Krai)
- Coordinates: 56°00′N 90°23′E
- Country: Russia
- Federal subject: Krasnoyarsk Krai
- Founded: 1700
- Town status since: 1961
- Elevation: 250 m (820 ft)

Population (2010 Census)
  - Total: 52,817
  - Estimate (2025): 43,770 (−17.1%)
  - Rank: 309th in 2010

Administrative status
  - Subordinated to: krai town of Nazarovo
  - Capital of: krai town of Nazarovo, Nazarovsky District

Municipal status
  - Urban okrug: Nazarovo Urban Okrug
  - Capital of: Nazarovo Urban Okrug, Nazarovsky Municipal District
- Time zone: UTC+7 (MSK+4)
- Postal code: 662200
- OKTMO ID: 04726000001
- Website: www.nazarovograd.ru

Nazarovo (Russian: Наза́рово) is a town in Krasnoyarsk Krai, Russia, located on the left bank of the Chulym River (an Ob River tributary), 239 kilometers (149 mi) west of Krasnoyarsk. Population: 52,817 (2010 census); 56,539 (2002 census); 64,350 (1989 Soviet census).

Historical population
Year	Pop.	±%
1939	4,263	—
1959	29,689	+596.4%
1970	44,173	+48.8%
1979	53,696	+21.6%
1989	64,350	+19.8%
2002	56,539	−12.1%
2010	52,817	−6.6%
2021	45,333	−14.2%
Source: Census data

== History ==
The selo of Nazarovo was founded in 1700 by Nazary Patyukov, a Cossack, and was named after him. In 1888, deposits of brown coal were discovered in the vicinity of the village, and in 1925 a railroad was built through it. The selo was granted urban-type settlement status in 1946 and town status in 1961.

== Administrative and municipal status ==
Within the framework of administrative divisions, Nazarovo serves as the administrative center of Nazarovsky District, even though it is not a part of it. As an administrative division, it is incorporated separately as the krai town of Nazarovo—an administrative unit with the status equal to that of the districts. As a municipal division, the krai town of Nazarovo is incorporated as Nazarovo Urban Okrug.

== Local government ==
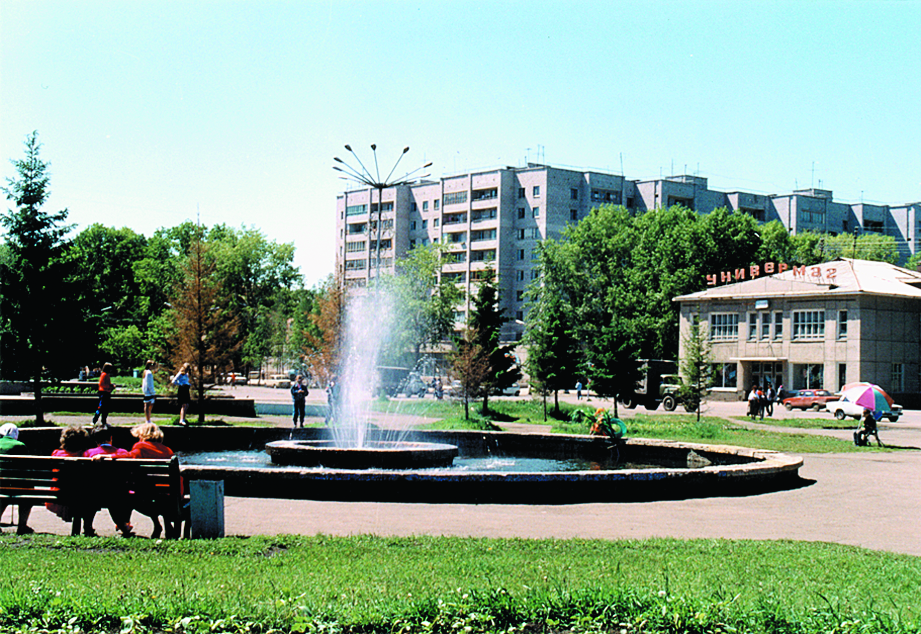
Central square

Local government bodies of the city include:

- The Nazarovo City Council of Deputies, a representative body of local self-government (elected by direct universal suffrage for a 5-year term).

Currently, deputies elected in 2022 work on the City Council.

Faction	Number of deputies
United Russia	17
Communist Party of the Russian Federation	2
Liberal Democratic Party of Russia	1

- Chairman of the City Council Olga Martus.
- The head of the city of Nazarovo is the highest official who heads the activities for the implementation of local self-government in the territory of the city of Nazarovo. Since 9 March 2022, the head of the city is Vladimir Saar.
