= Bogotol =

Town in Krasnoyarsk Krai, Russia

Bogotol Боготол
- Town
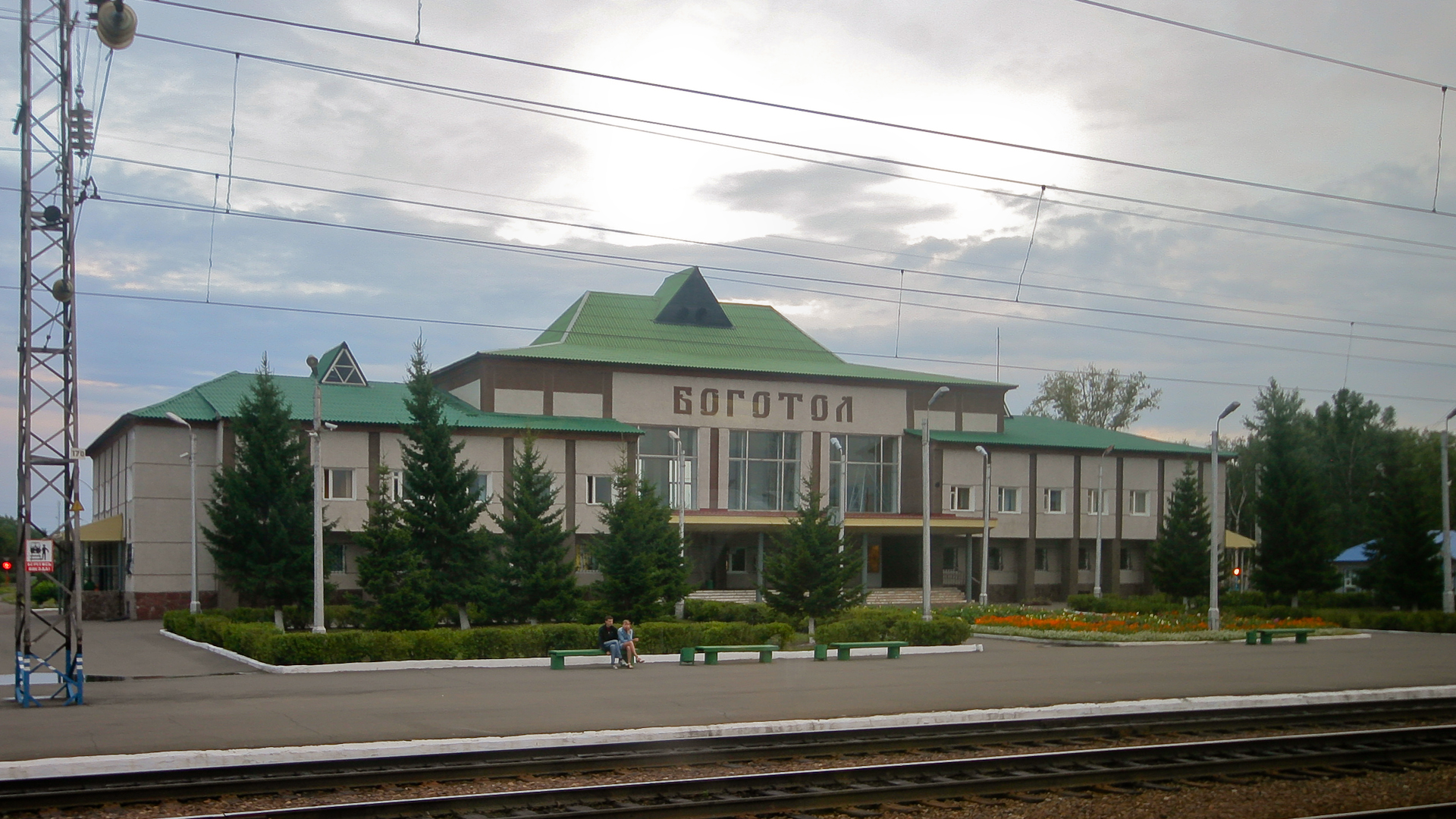
- Bogotol railway station

- Flag Coat of arms
- Interactive map of Bogotol
- Location of Bogotol Bogotol (Krasnoyarsk Krai)
- Coordinates: 56°12′N 89°31′E
- Country: Russia
- Federal subject: Krasnoyarsk Krai
- Founded: 1893
- Town status since: 1911
- Elevation: 290 m (950 ft)

Population (2010 Census)
  - Total: 21,051
  - Estimate (2021): 18,206 (−13.5%)

Administrative status
  - Subordinated to: krai town of Bogotol
  - Capital of: krai town of Bogotol, Bogotolsky District

Municipal status
  - Urban okrug: Bogotol Urban Okrug
  - Capital of: Bogotol Urban Okrug, Bogotolsky Municipal District
- Time zone: UTC+7 (MSK+4)
- Postal code: 662060–662063
- OKTMO ID: 04706000001
- Website: bogotolcity.ru

Bogotol (Russian: Богото́л) is a town in Krasnoyarsk Krai, Russia, located 6 kilometers (3.7 mi) of the Chulym River and 252 kilometers (157 mi) west of Krasnoyarsk, the administrative center of the krai. Population: 21,051 (2010 census); 24,369 (2002 census); 27,752 (1989 Soviet census).

== History ==
It was founded in 1893 due to the construction of the Trans-Siberian Railway. The name derives from the Ket words bogotu (one of the Ket tribes in the area) and ul (river). Bogotol was granted town status in 1911.

== Administrative and municipal status ==
Within the framework of administrative divisions, Bogotol serves as the administrative center of Bogotolsky District, even though it is not a part of it. As an administrative division, it is incorporated separately as the krai town of Bogotol—an administrative unit with the status equal to that of the districts. As a municipal division, the krai town of Bogotol is incorporated as Bogotol Urban Okrug.
