= Sosnovoborsk, Krasnoyarsk Krai =

Town in Krasnoyarsk Krai, Russia

Sosnovoborsk Сосновоборск
- Town
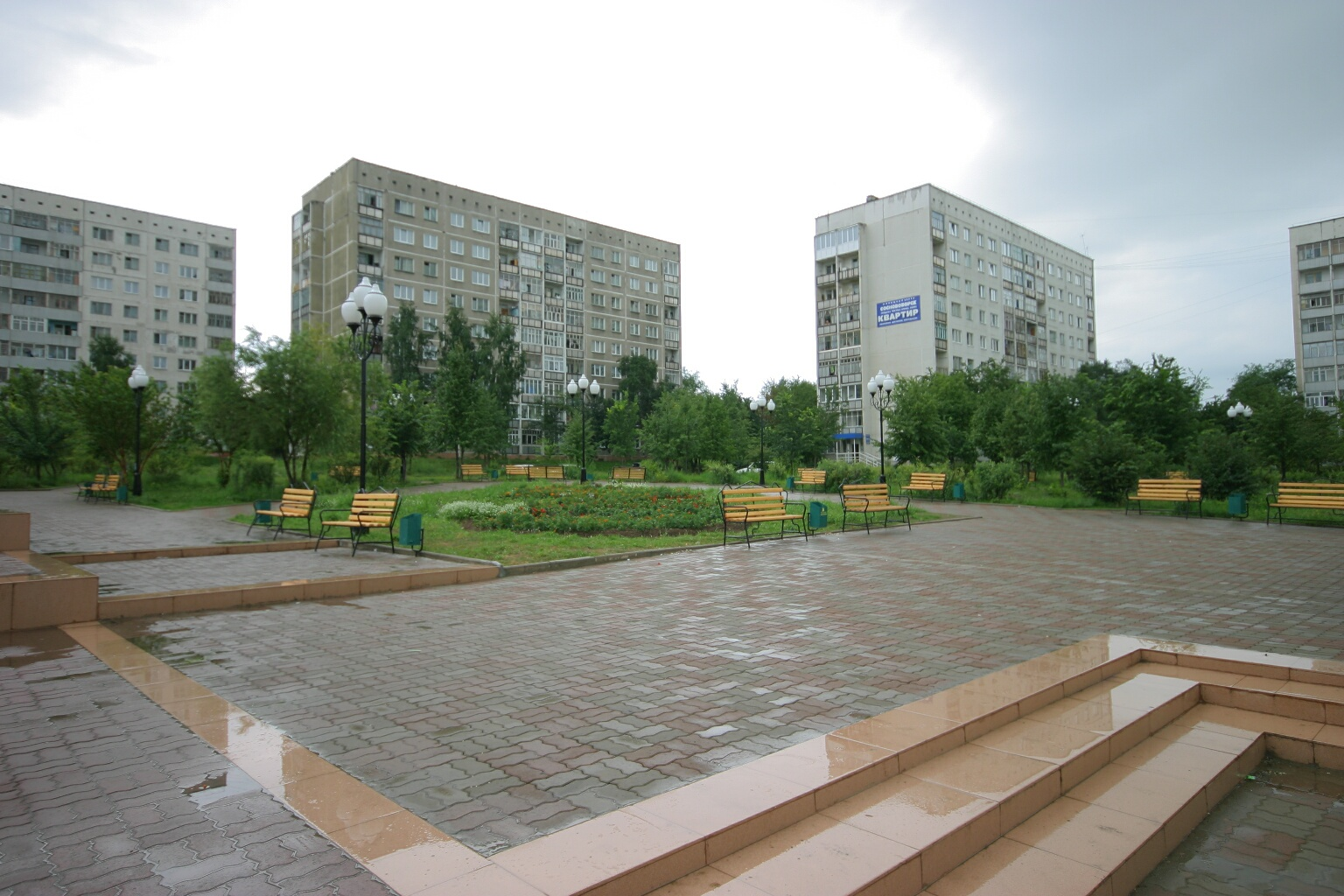
- Sosnovoborsk apartments

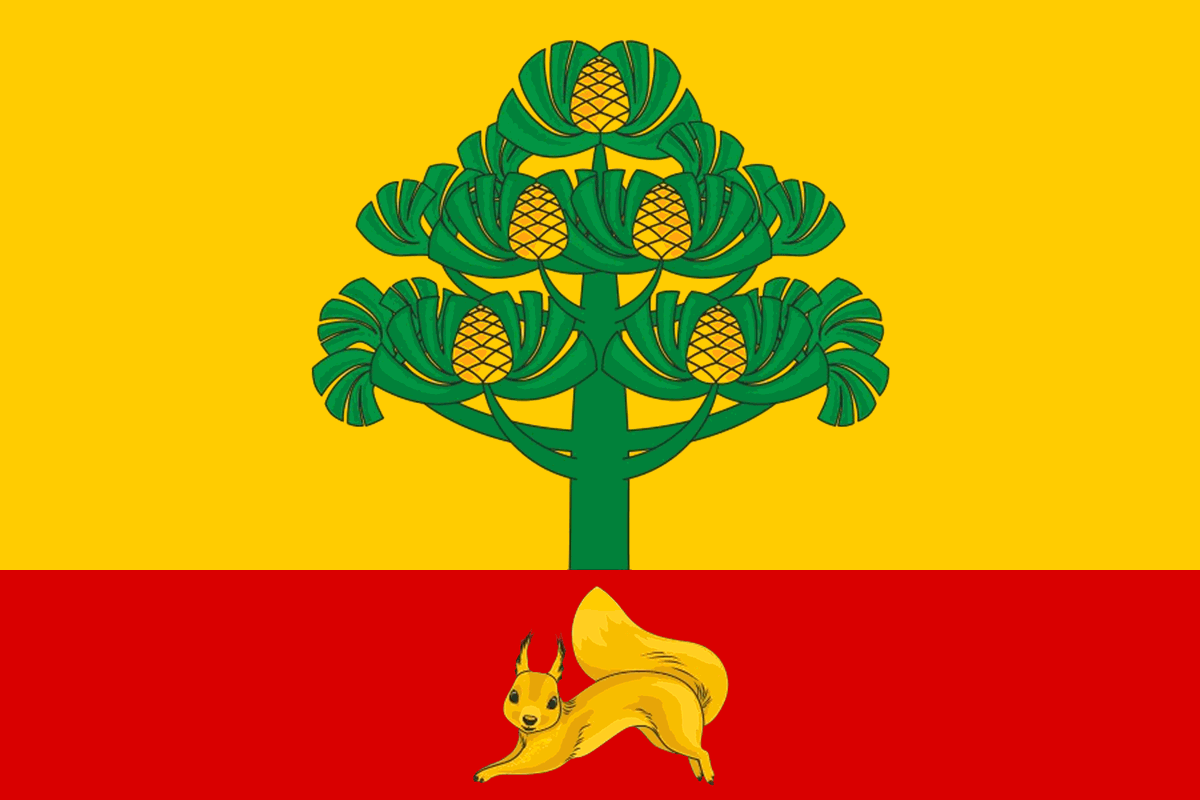
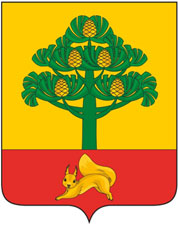
- Flag Coat of arms
- Interactive map of Sosnovoborsk
- Location of Sosnovoborsk Sosnovoborsk (Krasnoyarsk Krai)
- Coordinates: 56°08′N 93°22′E
- Country: Russia
- Federal subject: Krasnoyarsk Krai
- Founded: 1971
- Town status since: 1985

Area
  - Total: 26.64 km^{2} (10.29 sq mi)
- Elevation: 160 m (520 ft)

Population (2010 Census)
  - Total: 33,091
  - Estimate (2021): 40,442 (+22.2%)
  - Density: 1,242/km^{2} (3,217/sq mi)

Administrative status
  - Subordinated to: krai town of Sosnovoborsk
  - Capital of: krai town of Sosnovoborsk

Municipal status
  - Urban okrug: Sosnovoborsk Urban Okrug
  - Capital of: Sosnovoborsk Urban Okrug
- Time zone: UTC+7 (MSK+4)
- Postal code: 662500–662501
- Dialing code: +7 39131
- OKTMO ID: 04733000001
- Website: sosnovoborsk-city.ru

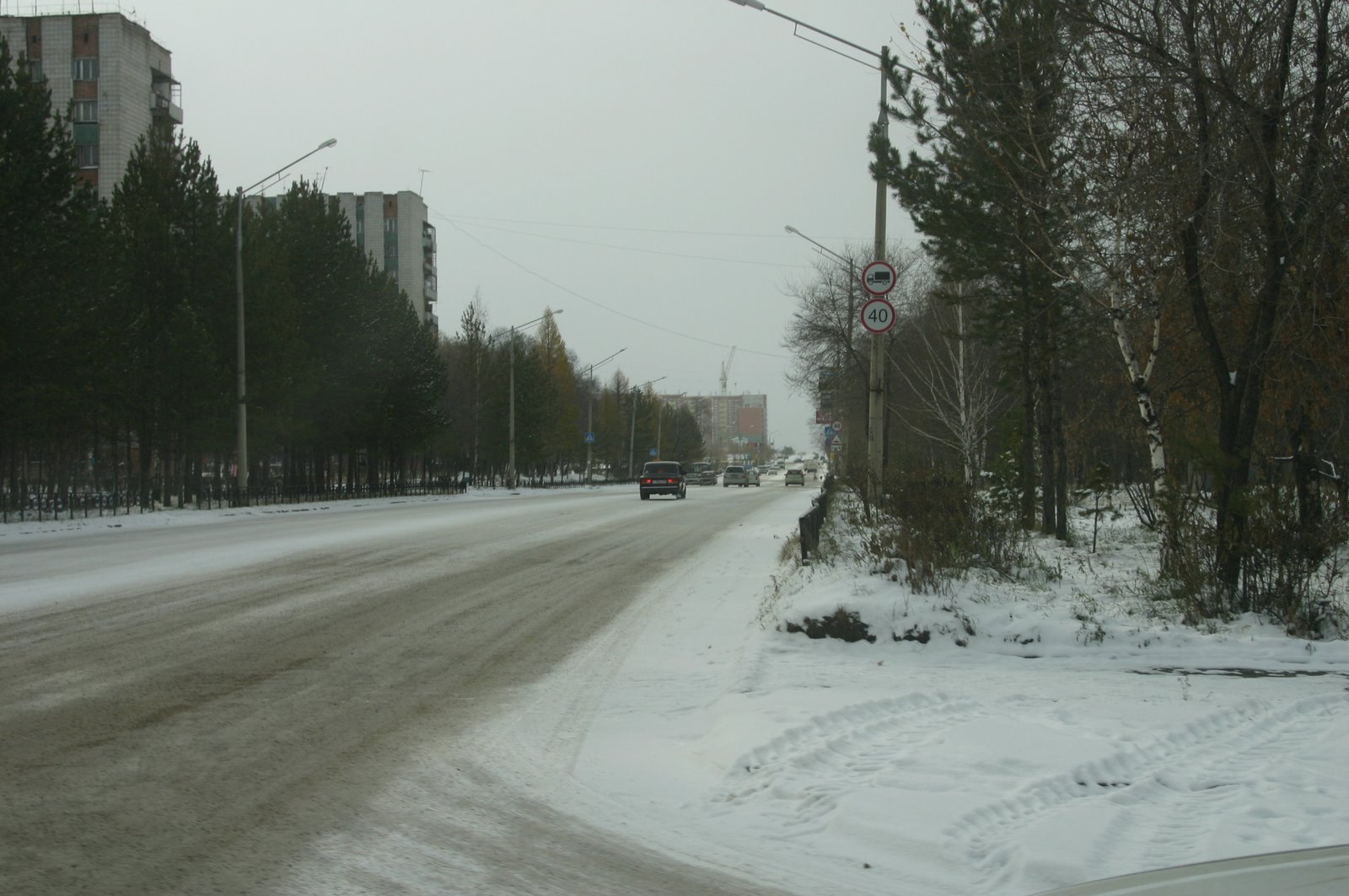
Sosnovoborsk main road

Sosnovoborsk (Russian: Сосновобо́рск) is a town in Krasnoyarsk Krai, Russia, located on the right bank of the Yenisei River, 20 kilometers (12 mi) northeast of Krasnoyarsk. Sosnovoborsk is the quickest growing town in Krasnoyarsk region and is a part of Krasnoyarsk metro area.

== History ==
It was founded in 1971 as a working settlement in connection with the construction of the Krasnoyarsk Automobile Trailers Plant (Krasnoyarsk Plant for Automobile and Tractor Trailers and Semi-Trailers). Since 1973 it has been called Sosnovoborsk; the name refers to the pine forests (Russian: sosnovy bor) surrounding the settlement. For some time, it was part of the Leninsky District of Krasnoyarsk. It was granted town status in 1985.

In 1970, the Soviet government decided to build a large plant for the production of trailers and semi-trailers for KamAZ vehicles near Krasnoyarsk. At the same time, construction of the settlement that would become Sosnovoborsk began. The first director of the plant was Yuri Ivanovich Matveev, who later became the city's first honorary citizen. The city has continued to develop and expand since its foundation.

== Population ==
Historical population
Year	Pop.	±%
1979	12,650	—
1989	29,686	+134.7%
2002	30,586	+3.0%
2010	33,091	+8.2%
2021	40,442	+22.2%

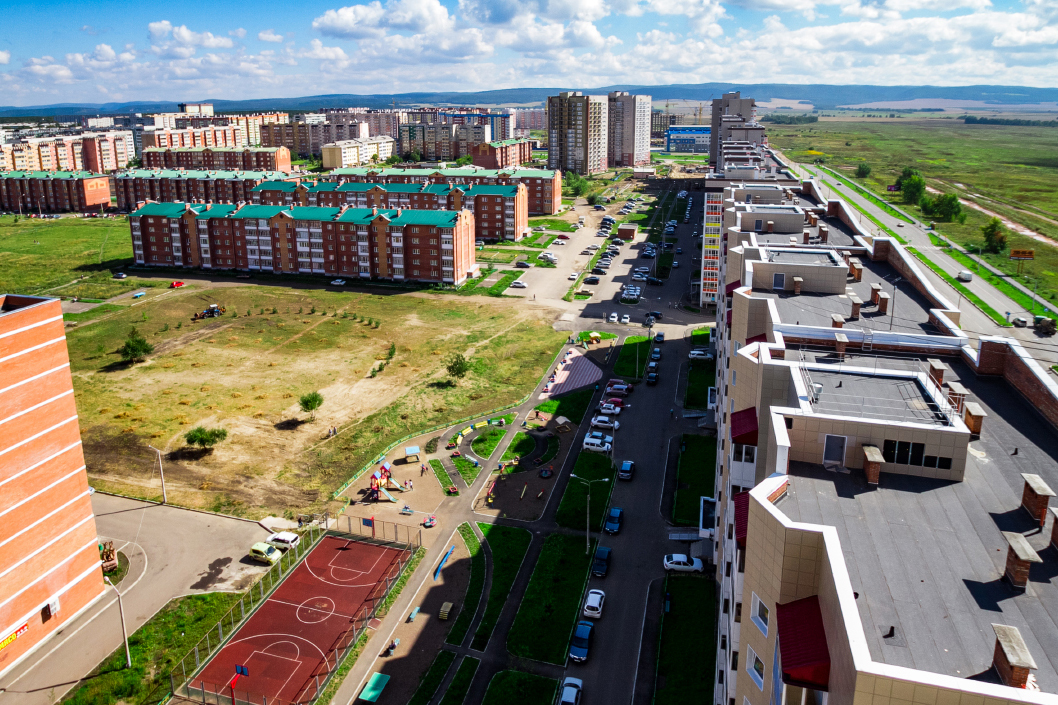
The view of new Sosnovoborsk district

As of January 1, 2022, in terms of population, the city was in 369th place out of 1117cities of the Russian Federation.

The demographic situation in the city is characterized by an intensive population growth. For the intercensal period 2002-2010. the number of city residents increased by +8.2%. In terms of population growth, Sosnovoborsk overtook Krasnoyarsk at that time, where the growth was + 7.2% . From 2010 to 2020, the population grew by 22.7%.

== Transportation ==
In Sosnovoborsk there are intercity buses No. 1, 2 and 3. Bus number 1 appeared in the city on March 29, 2013. Bus number 2 appeared in the city on October 31, 2014. Bus number 3 appeared in the city on January 1, 2020. The fare for a city bus is 22 rubles.

Sosnovoborsk is connected by bus routes with Krasnoyarsk and Zheleznogorsk, as well as with the village of Podgorny. A significant part of the inhabitants of Sosnovoborsk works in the regional center (Krasnoyarsk), making daily morning and evening commute.

The immediate plans include the commissioning of the movement of electric trains along the railway track of the Zheleznogorsk Mining and Chemical Combine from the railway station of Krasnoyarsk through Sosnovoborsk to Zheleznogorsk.

=== Interchange at the entrance to the city ===
For a long time, entry into Sosnovoborsk was possible only through a railway crossing in the northern part of the city, which caused a lot of problems due to insufficient capacity, leading to congestion. In this regard, it was decided to build a new entrance to the city in the form of a two-level interchange. Construction began in September 2009. The opening took place on November 23, 2010. The Krasnoyarsk-Zheleznogorsk road in this section has been expanded to four lanes. The interchange does not have an exit from the city in the direction of Zheleznogorsk - it is possible to go there through a saved crossing. The entrance to Sosnovoborsk became seven kilometers closer to Krasnoyarsk.

== Social sphere ==
There are five secondary schools in the city, a house for children's creativity, a children's art school, an automechanical technical school, preschool institutions, a children's and youth sports school, the Torpedo stadium, the "Dream" House of Culture, a leisure center, the editorial office of the "Rabochiy" newspaper, and "Pyaterochka”, “Commander”, “Krasny Yar” chains of stores.

Sports complex "Nadezhda", "Coliseum", Ski lodge "Snezhinka". The Krasnoyarsk Regional Fund “Krasnoyarsk without orphans” is actively working on the territory.
