= Nazarovsky District =

Nazarovsky District Назаровский район (Russian)
- District
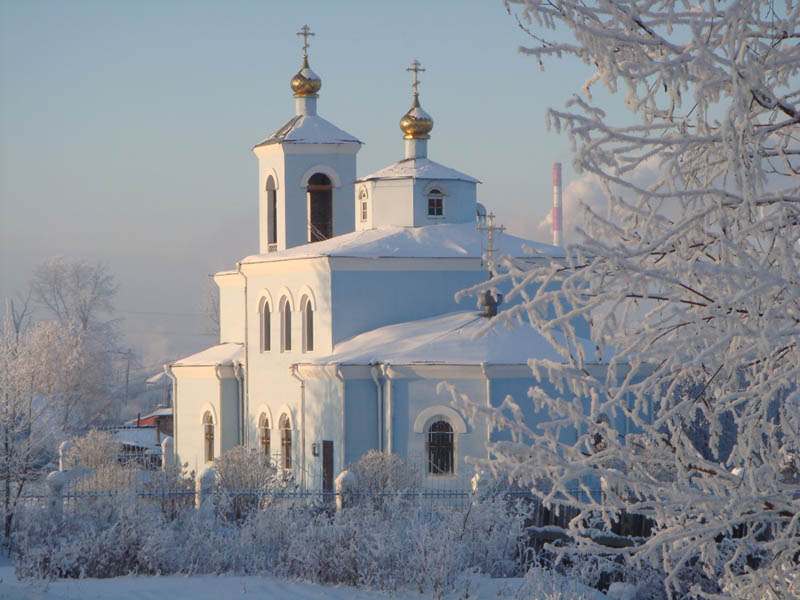
- Church in Nazarovo, Nazarovsky District

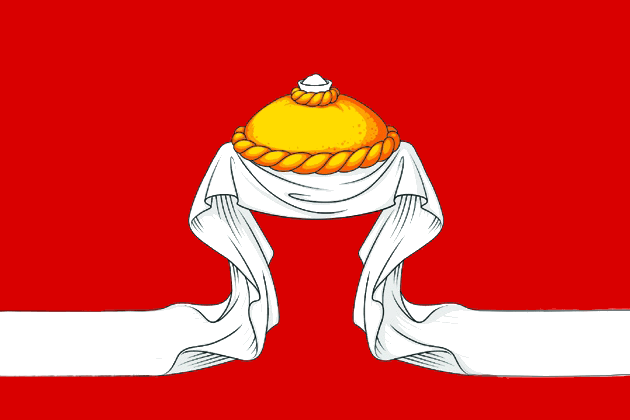
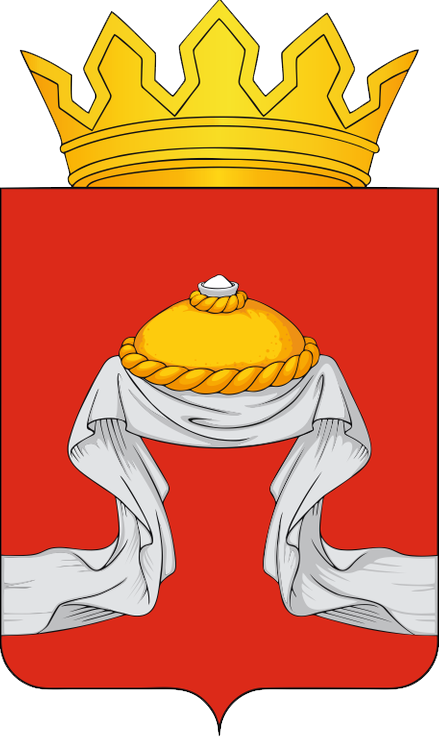
- Flag Coat of arms
- Location of Nazarovsky District in Krasnoyarsk Krai
- Coordinates: 56°00′N 90°23′E
- Country: Russia
- Federal subject: Krasnoyarsk Krai
- Established: April 4, 1924
- Administrative center: Nazarovo

Government
  - Type: Local government
  - Body: Nazarovsky District Council of Deputies
  - Head: Alexander V. Shadrygin

Area
  - Total: 4,230 km^{2} (1,630 sq mi)

Population (2010 Census)
  - Total: 23,547
  - Density: 5.57/km^{2} (14.4/sq mi)
  - Urban: 0%
  - Rural: 100%

Administrative structure
  - Administrative divisions: 10 selsoviet
  - Inhabited localities: 60 rural localities

Municipal structure
  - Municipally incorporated as: Nazarovsky Municipal District
  - Municipal divisions: 0 urban settlements, 10 rural settlements
- Time zone: UTC+7 (MSK+4)
- OKTMO ID: 04637000
- Website: http://nazarovo-adm.ru

Nazarovsky District (Russian: Наза́ровский райо́н) is an administrative and municipal district (raion), one of the forty-three in Krasnoyarsk Krai, Russia. It is located in the southwest of the krai and borders with Achinsky District in the north, Kozulsky District in the east, Balakhtinsky District in the southeast, Uzhursky District in the south, Sharypovsky District in the west, and with Bogotolsky District in the northwest. The area of the district is 4,230 square kilometers (1,630 sq mi). Its administrative center is the town of Nazarovo (which is not administratively a part of the district). Population: 23,547 (2010 census); 24,265 (2002 Census); 21,720 (1989 Soviet census).

== History ==
The district was established on April 4, 1924.

== Administrative and municipal status ==
Within the framework of administrative divisions, Nazarovsky District is one of the forty-three in the krai. The town of Nazarovo serves as its administrative center, despite being incorporated separately as a krai town—an administrative unit with the status equal to that of the districts. The district is divided into ten selsoviets.

As a municipal division, the district is incorporated as Nazarovsky Municipal District and is divided into ten rural settlements (corresponding to the administrative district's selsoviets). The krai town of Nazarovo is incorporated separately from the district as Nazarovo Urban Okrug.
