= List of chairmen of the Legislative Assembly of Krasnoyarsk Krai =

The chairman of the Legislative Assembly of Krasnoyarsk Krai is the presiding officer of that legislature.

== Office-holders ==
1. Stanislav Yermachenko 1994–1998
2. Aleksandr Uss 1998–2017
3. Dmitry Sviridov 2017–2021
4. Alexey Dodatko 2021–
