= Strelka, Vichugsky District, Ivanovo Oblast =

Strelka Стрелка
- Village
- Location within Ivanovo Oblast Location within Russia
- Coordinates: 57°24′N 41°48′E
- Country: Russia
- Region: Ivanovo Oblast
- District: Vichugsky District
- Time zone: UTC+3:00

Strelka (Russian: Стрелка) is a rural locality (a village) in Vichugsky District, Ivanovo Oblast, Russia. Population: 76 (2010 census); 86 (2002 census);

== Geography ==
This rural locality is located 23 km from Vichuga (the district's administrative centre), 68 km from Ivanovo (capital of Ivanovo Oblast) and 311 km from Moscow. Borshchevka is the nearest rural locality.
