= Lake Glubokoye (Putorana) =

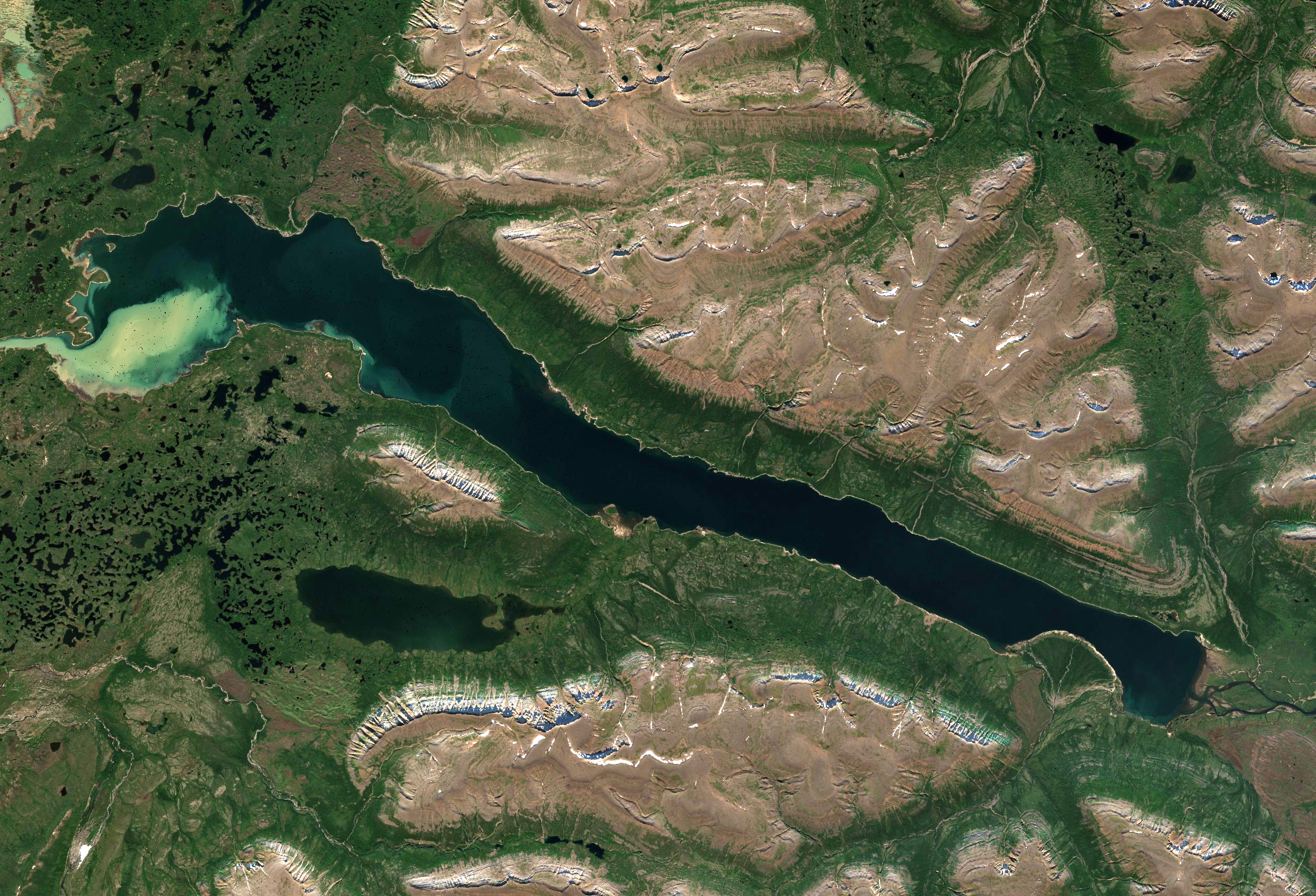
- Lake Glubokoye, Krasnoyarsk Krai, Russia

- Location in Russia Lake Glubokoye (Krasnoyarsk Krai)
- Location: Putorana Plateau
- Coordinates: 69°19′24″N 89°48′11″E
- Basin countries: Russia
- Surface area: 136 km^{2} (53 sq mi)
- Average depth: 16 m (52 ft)

Lake Glubokoye (Russian: Глубокое, literally: "Deep", Yakut language: Омук-күөлэ, Omuk-küöle, transliterated in Russian as Омук-Кюёль, Omuk-Kyuyol) is a lake near Norilsk, Russia.

== Geography ==
Lake Glubokoye is located just south of Lake Lama on the Eastern edge of the Putorana Plateau. It is connected with Lake Melkoye ("Lake Shallow") by the Glubokaya River.

It has an area of 136 km^{2} and an average depth of 16 m.
