= Krasnoyarsk Krai =

First-level administrative division of Russia

Krasnoyarsk Krai Красноярский край (Russian)
- Krai
- Flag Coat of arms
- Anthem: Anthem of Krasnoyarsk Krai
- Coordinates: 59°53′N 91°40′E
- Country: Russia
- Federal district: Siberian
- Economic region: East Siberian
- Established: December 7, 1934
- Administrative center: Krasnoyarsk

Government
  - Body: Legislative Assembly
  - Governor: Mikhail Kotyukov

Area
  - Total: 2,366,797 km^{2} (913,825 sq mi)
  - Rank: 2nd

Population (2021 census)
  - Total: 2,856,971
  - Estimate (2018): 2,876,497
  - Rank: 14th
  - Density: 1.207104/km^{2} (3.126386/sq mi)
  - Urban: 79.3%
  - Rural: 20.7%

GDP (nominal, 2024)
  - Total: ₽3.72 trillion (US$43.65 billion)
  - Per capita: ₽1.31 million (US$15,337.19)
- Time zone: UTC+7 (MSK+4)
- ISO 3166 code: RU-KYA
- License plates: 24, 84, 88, 124, 224
- OKTMO ID: 04000000
- Official languages: Russian
- Website: www.krskstate.ru

Krasnoyarsk Krai (Note: Russian: Красноярский край, romanized: Krasnoyárskiy kray, IPA: [krəsnɐˈjarskʲɪj ˈkraj]) is a federal subject (a krai) of Russia located in Siberia. Its administrative center is the city of Krasnoyarsk, the second-largest city in Siberia after Novosibirsk. Comprising half of the Siberian Federal District, Krasnoyarsk Krai is the largest krai in Russia, the second-largest federal subject in the country after neighboring Sakha, and the third-largest country subdivision by area in the world. The krai covers an area of 2,366,797 square kilometers (913,825 sq mi), constituting roughly 13% of Russia's total area. Krasnoyarsk Krai has a population of 2,856,971 as of the 2021 census.

== Geography ==
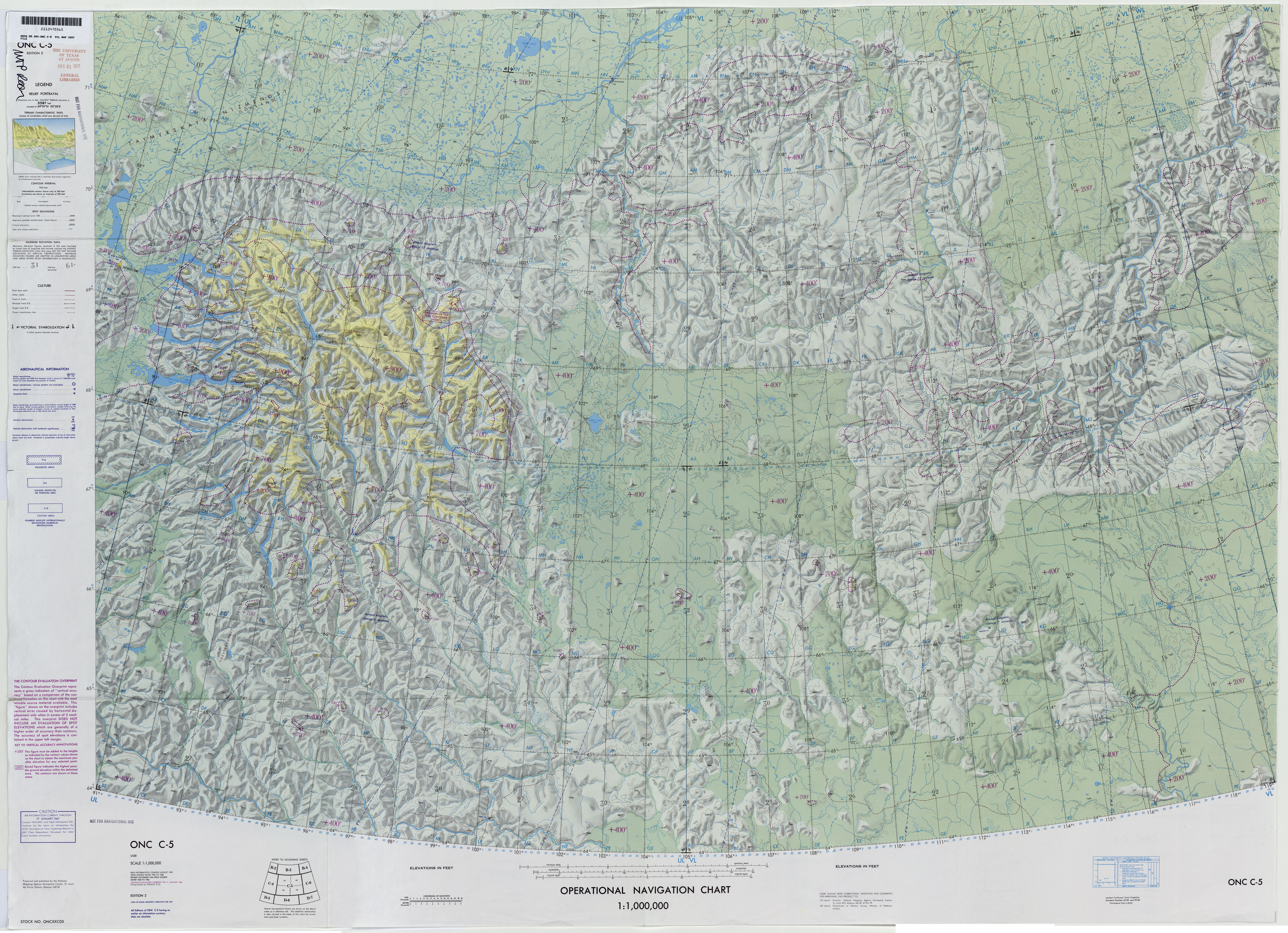
Map including part of northern Krasnoyarsk Krai

The krai lies in the middle of Siberia, and occupies nearly half of the Siberian Federal District, almost splitting it in half, stretching 3,000 kilometres (1,900 mi) from the Sayan Mountains in the south along the Yenisei River to the Taymyr Peninsula in the north. It borders (counting clockwise from the sea) the Sakha Republic, Irkutsk, the Tuva Republic, the Republic of Khakassia, Kemerovo, Tomsk, Tyumen Oblasts, the Khanty-Mansi Autonomous Okrug, the Yamalo-Nenets Autonomous Okrug and the Kara Sea and Laptev Sea of the Arctic Ocean in the north.

The krai is located in the basin of the Arctic Ocean; a great number of rivers that flow through the krai drain into it eventually. The main rivers of the krai are the Yenisei, and its tributaries (from south to north): the Kan, the Angara, the Podkamennaya Tunguska, the Nizhnyaya Tunguska and the Tanama.

There are also several thousand lakes in the krai. The largest lakes include Beloye, Belyo, Glubokoye, Itat, Khantayskoye, Labas, Lama, Pyasina, Taymyr, and Yessey. The rivers and lakes are rich in fish.

The climate is strongly continental with large temperature variations during the year. Long winters and short, hot summers are characteristic for the central and southern regions where most of the krai's population lives. The territory of Krasnoyarsk Krai experiences conditions of three climate belts: arctic, subarctic, and humid continental. In the north there are less than 40 days with temperature above 10 °C (50 °F), while in the south there are 110–120 such days.

The average temperature in January is −36 °C (−32.8 °F) in the north and −18 °C (−0.4 °F) in the south. The average temperature in July is 5 to 10 °C (41 to 50 °F) in the north – where the most poleward tree line in the world is found at Ary-Mas – and +20 °C (68 °F) in the south. The annual precipitation is 316 millimeters (12.4 in) (up to 1,200 millimeters (47 in) in the foothills of the Sayan Mountains). Snow covers the central regions of the krai from early November until late March. The peaks of the Sayan Mountains higher than 2,400–2,600 metres (7,900–8,500 ft) and those of the Putorana Plateau higher than 1,000–1,300 metres (3,300–4,300 ft) are covered with permanent snow. Permafrost is absent at low altitudes south of Lesosibirsk, but as one moves north it grades from sporadic around the 58th parallel to extensive discontinuous around the 60th parallel and continuous north of the 63rd parallel.

The coastline contains several prominent peninsulas – from west to east the main ones are the Minina Peninsula, Mikhailov Peninsula, the Taymyr Peninsula (by far the largest, and itself containing the Zarya Peninsula, Oskara Peninsula and Chelyuskin Peninsula) and the Khara-Tumus Peninsula.

There are also a large number of islands off the krai's coast, the most prominent of which are (from west to east) Sibiryakov Island, Nosok Island, Dikson Island, Vern Island, Brekhovskiye Island (in the Yenisei Gulf), Krestovskiy Island, the Kamennye Islands, the Zveroboy Islands, the Labyrintovye Islands, the Plavnikovye Islands, Kolosovykh Island, the Mona Islands, Rykacheva Island, Gavrilova Island, Belukha and Prodolgovatyy Islands, the Nordenskiöld Archipelago, the Firnley Islands, the Heiberg Islands, Starokadomsky Island, Maly Taymyr Island, the Komsomolskaya Pravda Islands, the Faddey Islands, and the Saint Peter Islands. There are also a number of islands further out that fall under the administration of Krasnoyarsk Krai – the most prominent being Bolshoy Island, Sverdrup Island, the Izvestiy TSIK Islands, the Arkticheskiy Institut Islands, the Kirov Islands, Uyedineniya Island, Voronina Island, Severnaya Zemlya (the largest group), and Ushakov Island. The highest point of the krai is Grandiozny Peak in the Eastern Sayan Mountains at an elevation of 2,922 meters (9,587 ft).

In the south there is a Ergaki Nature Park which is a protected area of Krasnoyarsk Krai. It contains the Western Sayan Mountains. The park was established in 2005 and it covers an area of 342,873 ha (847,260 acres). It is bordered by the Yenisei highway.

== History ==
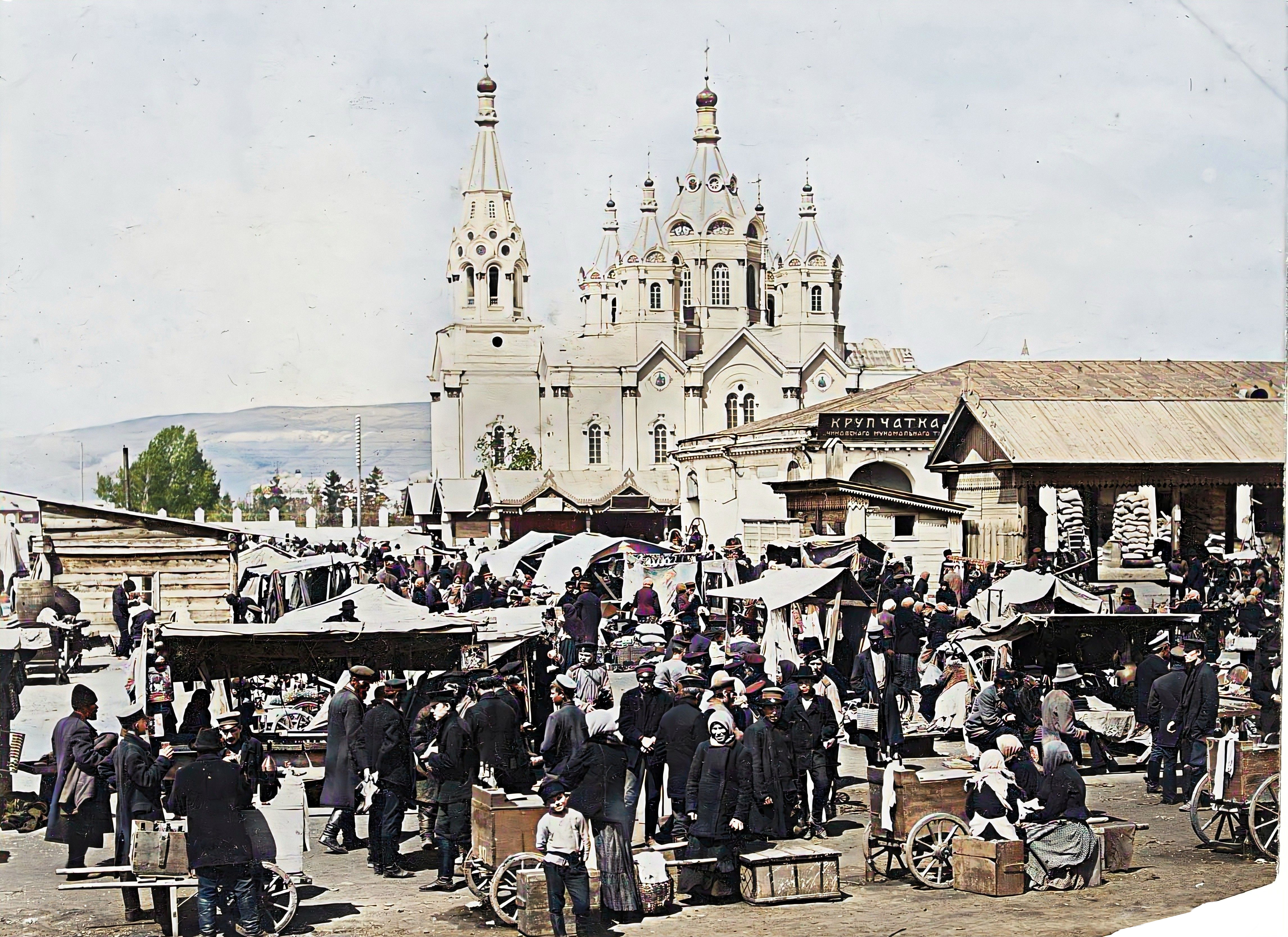
Mother of God-Nativity Cathedral (Krasnoyarsk) 1900

According to archaeologists, the first people reached Siberia circa 40,000 BC. The Andronovo culture, a group of Bronze Age peoples, lived in the area around 2000–900 BC, the remains of which were discovered in 1914 near the village of Andronovo, Uzhursky District. The grave-mounds and monuments of the Scythian culture in Krasnoyarsk Krai belong to the 7th century BC and are some of the oldest in Eurasia. A prince's grave, the Kurgan Arshan, discovered in 2001, is also located in the krai.

Russian settlement of the area (mostly by Cossacks) began in the 17th century. After the construction of the Trans-Siberian Railway the Russian colonization of the area strongly increased. In 1822, the Yeniseysk Governorate was created with Krasnoyarsk as its administrative center that covered territory very similar to that of the current krai.

During both the Tsarist and the Soviet times, the territory of Krasnoyarsk Krai was used as a place of exile of political enemies, actual or alleged. The first leaders of the Soviet state, Vladimir Lenin and Joseph Stalin, were exiled to what is now the krai in 1897–1900 and 1903, respectively. In Stalin's era, numerous Gulag camps were located in the region.

On June 30, 1908, in the basin of the Podkamennaya Tunguska River, there occurred a powerful explosion most likely to have been caused by the air burst of a large meteoroid or comet fragment at an altitude of 5–10 kilometers (3.1–6.2 miles) above the Earth's surface. The force of the explosion is estimated to be about 10–15 megatons. It flattened more than 2,000 square kilometers (490,000 acres) of pine forest and killed thousands of reindeer.

Krasnoyarsk Krai was created in 1934 after disaggregation of the West Siberian and East Siberian Krais and later included Taymyr and Evenk Autonomous Okrugs and Khakas Autonomous Oblast. In 1991, Khakassia separated from the krai and became a republic within the Russian Federation. On January 1, 2007, following a referendum on the issue held on April 17, 2005, the territories of Evenk and Taymyr Autonomous Okrugs were merged into the krai.

== Politics ==
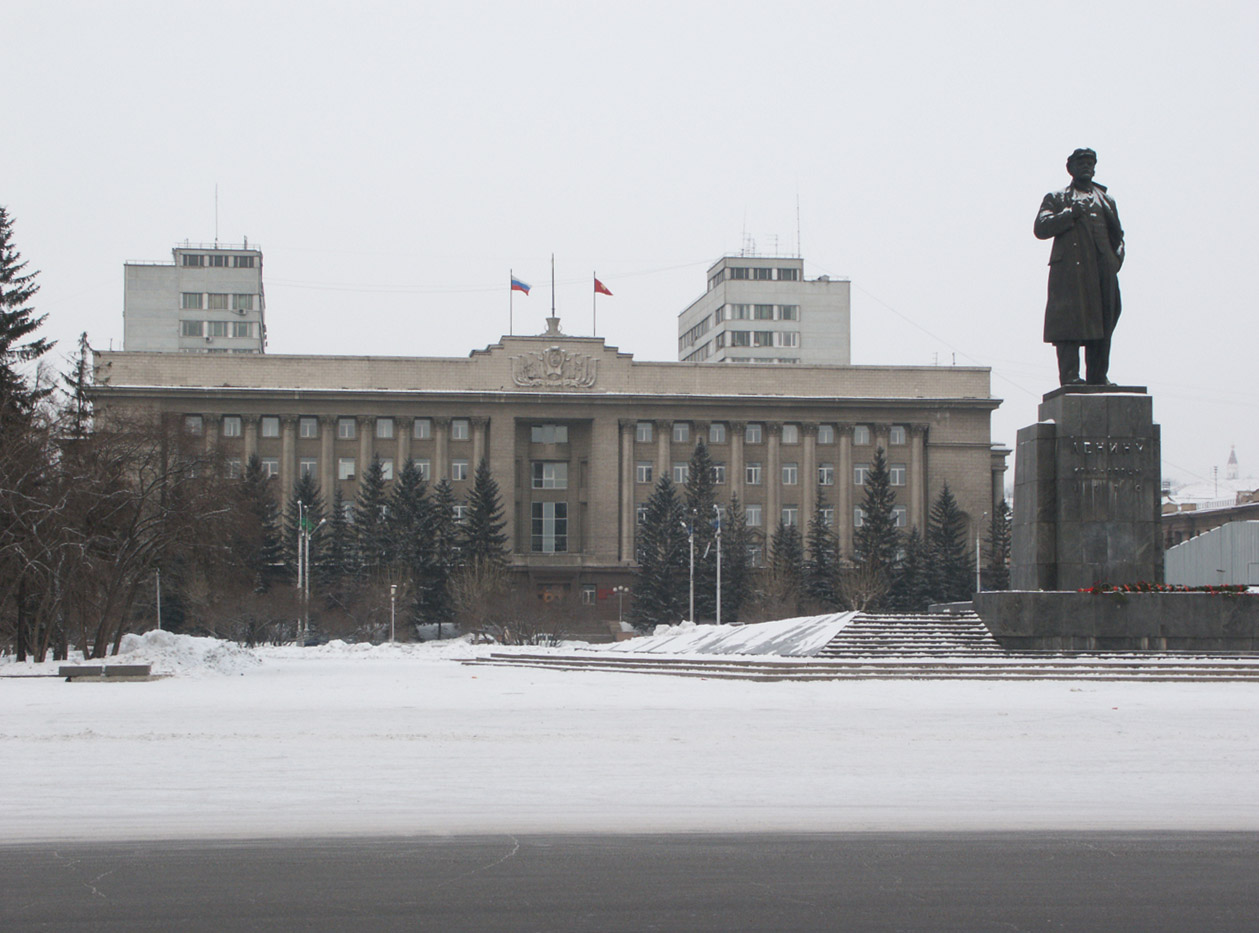
The seat of the oblast administration in the Revolution Square, 2005

During the Soviet period, the high authority in the krai was shared between three persons: The first secretary of the Krasnoyarsk CPSU Committee (who in reality had the most authority), the chairman of the krai Soviet (legislative power), and the chairman of the krai Executive Committee (executive power). Since the Dissolution of the Soviet Union in 1991 and the demise of the CPSU, the head of the krai administration, and eventually the governor has been appointed or elected alongside the elected regional parliament.

The Charter of Krasnoyarsk Krai is the fundamental law of the region. The Legislative Assembly of Krasnoyarsk Krai is the province's regional standing legislative (representative) body. The Legislative Assembly exercises its authority by passing laws, resolutions, and other legal acts and by supervising the implementation and observance of the laws and other legal acts passed by it. The legislative assembly consists of 52 deputies. 22 of them are elected in 22 one-mandate electoral districts by plurality system, 2 in Taymyr, 2 in Evenkia, and 26 are elected by proportional system from the lists offered by political parties. The highest executive body is the Oblast Government, which includes territorial executive bodies such as district administrations, committees, and commissions that facilitate development and run the day-to-day matters of the province. The Oblast administration supports the activities of the Governor who is the highest official and acts as the guarantor of the observance of the krai Charter in accordance with the Constitution of Russia.

In December 1991, president Boris Yeltsin appointed Arkady Veprev as the first governor of Krasnoyarsk Krai. In January 1993 Yeltsin appointed Valery Zubov as the second governor of Krasnoyarsk Krai. In Krasnoyarsk Territory governor elections were called. Zubov was elected in a universal election for a five-year term. The Legislative Assembly of Krasnoyarsk Krai was created as well.

In 1998, Zubov lost in the gubernatorial election to General Aleksandr Lebed, a well-known politician in all of Russia. In 2002 Lebed died in a helicopter accident.

In 2002, Alexander Khloponin, the governor of Taymyr Autonomous Okrug and an influential businessman, was elected a governor of Krasnoyarsk Krai. In 2007, he was nominated by president Vladimir Putin for re-election, and the legislative assembly elected Khloponin for the second term.

In 2010, after Khloponin was promoted to the office of the president's envoy in the North Caucasian Federal District, Lev Kuznetsov, a businessman and politician from Khloponin's circle, became the new governor of the krai. After Kuznetsov, Viktor Tolokonsky became Governor September 2017. After Tolokonsky, Aleksandr Uss became the Governor of Krasnoyarsk Krai where he remains in the role today.

Krasnoyarsk Krai is represented in the Federation Council of Russia, the upper house of the Russian parliament by two senators. In 2007, eight deputies were elected to the State Duma from Krasnoyarsk regional lists of different political parties.

== Economy ==
Over 95% of the cities, a majority of the industrial enterprises, and all of the agriculture are concentrated in the south of the krai.

=== Natural resources ===
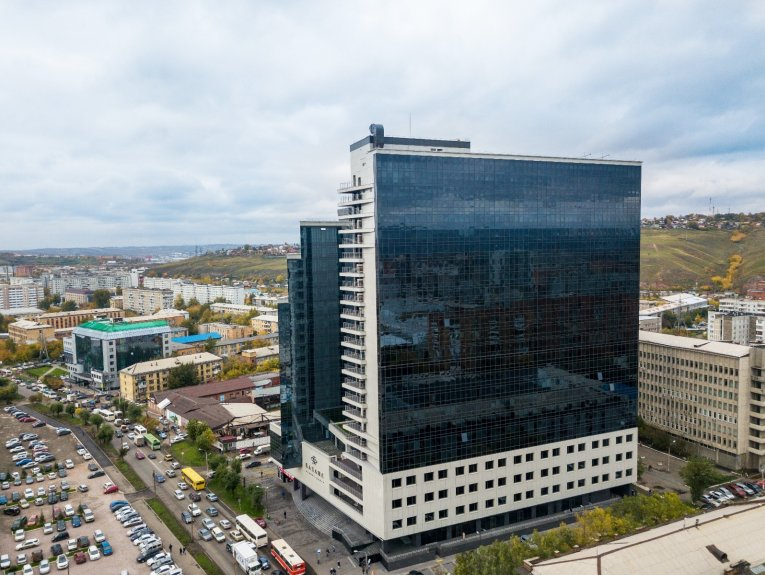
Business center "Balance". The largest business center of Asian part of Russia

The krai is among the richest of Russia's regions in natural resources: 80% of the country's nickel, 75% of its cobalt, 70% of its copper, 16% of its coal, and 10% of its gold are extracted here. Krasnoyarsk also produces 20% of the country's timber. More than 95% of Russian resources of platinum and platinoids are concentrated in the krai.

=== Industry ===
The krai's major industries are: non-ferrous metallurgy, energy, forestry, chemicals, and oil refining. The major financial-industrial groups of Krasnoyarsk Krai are:

- Basic Element (Krasnoyarsk Aluminium Plant, Achinsk Alumina Complex, Krasnoyarsk Pulp and Paper Plant)
- Interros (Norilsk Nickel)
- Evraz Group (iron mines, timber)
- MDM Group (SUEK, Siberian Coal and Energy Company)
- RusHydro (generation of electric power)
- RZhD (railroads)
- Information Satellite Systems Reshetnev satellite manufacturing

=== Power generation ===
The two most powerful hydroelectric plants in Russia are at the Yenisei River:

- Sajano-Schuschensk reservoir (Саяно-Шушенское водохранилище: 621 km^{2}; 31.300 Mio. m³; 6400 MW)
- Krasnoyarsk Reservoir (2130 km^{2}; 73.300 Mio. m³; 6000 MW)

Three are at its tributary Angara River:

- Irkutsk Hydroelectric Power Station (45.800 Mio. m³; 660 MW)
- Bratsk Reservoir (5426 km^{2}; 169.270 Mio. m³; 4500 MW)
- Ust-Ilimsk reservoir (Усть-Илимское водохранилище: 1873 km^{2}; 59.300 Mio. m³; 4320 MW)

It makes Krasnoyarsk Krai one of Russia's most important producers of electric energy and a desirable location for energy-intensive industries, such as aluminum plants.

=== Transportation ===
- Trans-Siberian Railroad (650 km (400 mi) within Krasnoyarsk Krai), Norilsk Railroad (northernmost railroad in the world before Obskaya–Bovanenkovo Line); North Siberian Railroad is planned.
- Highways: M53 Baikal (Novosibirsk-Krasnoyarsk-Irkutsk), M54 Yenisei (Krasnoyarsk-Kyzyl-Mongolia) R409 Eniseiskiy trakt (Krasnoyarsk-Lesosibirsk-Yeniseysk).
- Northern Sea Route and shipping on the Yenisei. The main ports are: Dudinka, Igarka, Turukhansk, Yeniseysk, Maklakovo, Strelka, Krasnoyarsk
- 26 airports, including an international airport (Yemelyanovo near Krasnoyarsk).
- Two pipes of Irkutsk-Anzhero-Sudzhensk petroleum pipeline.
- Major power transmission lines.

== Administrative divisions ==
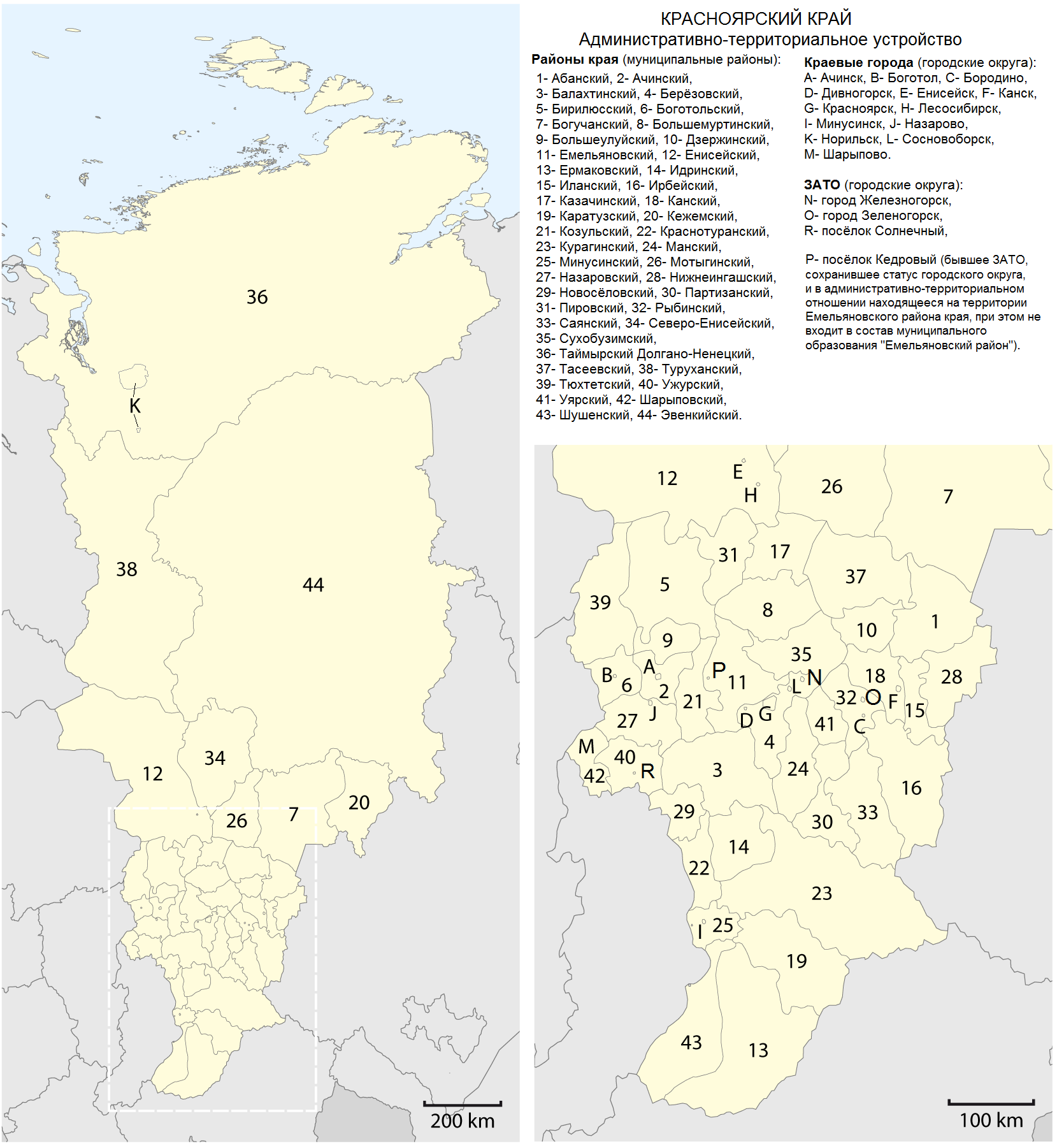

Krasnoyarsk Krai consists of forty-four districts and sixteen towns of district significance. Two of the districts (Evenkiysky and Taymyrsky; the former autonomous okrugs) have special status.

== Demographics ==
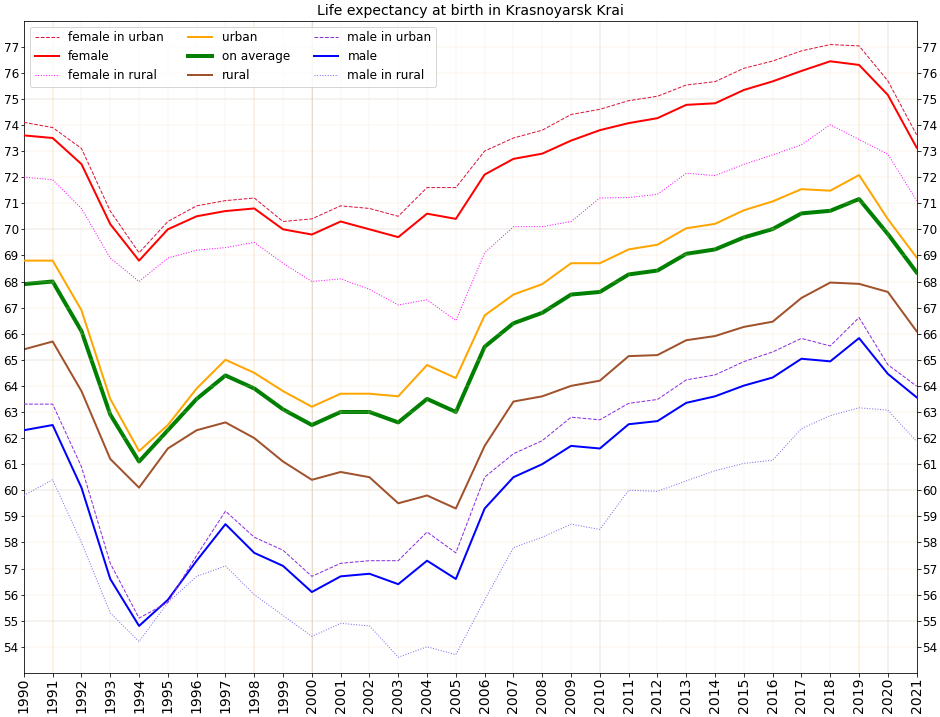
Life expectancy at birth in Krasnoyarsk Krai

Population: (including former Taymyr and Evenk Autonomous Okrugs): 2,856,971 (2021 census); 2,828,187 (2010 census); 3,023,525 (2002 census); 3,596,260 (1989 Soviet census).

Historical population
Year	Pop.	±%
1926	1,331,409	—
1959	2,204,051	+65.5%
1970	2,516,167	+14.2%
1979	2,699,196	+7.3%
1989	3,029,399	+12.2%
2002	2,966,042	−2.1%
2010	2,828,187	−4.6%
2021	2,856,971	+1.0%
Source: Census data

Ethnic groups: The population of the krai mostly consists of Russians, and some other peoples of the former Soviet Union. The indigenous Siberian peoples make up no more than 1% of the population.

The 2021 Census reported the following ethnic composition:

Ethnicity	Population	Percentage
Russians	2,382,723	93.6%
Tatars	19,418	0.8%
Tajiks	12,968	0.5%
Azerbaijanis	11,658	0.5%
Ukrainians	11,601	0.5%
Kyrgyz	10,652	0.4%
Others	95,645	3.8%
Ethnicity not stated	312,306	–

Vital statistics for 2024:

- Births: 24,687 (8.7 per 1,000)
- Deaths: 36,097 (12.7 per 1,000)

Total fertility rate (2024):
1.41 children per woman

Life expectancy (2021):
Total — 68.35 years (male — 63.56, female — 73.13)

=== Settlements ===
Largest cities or towns in Krasnoyarsk Krai 2021 Russian Census
Rank		Administrative Division	Pop.
1	Krasnoyarsk	City of krai significance of Krasnoyarsk	1,187,771
2	Norilsk	City of krai significance of Norilsk	174,453
3	Achinsk	Achinsky District	100,621
4	Kansk	Kansky District	86,816
5	Zheleznogorsk	Closed administrative-territorial formation of Zheleznogorsk	82,723
6	Minusinsk	Minusinsky District	70,089
7	Zelenogorsk	Closed administrative-territorial formation of Zelenogorsk	54,279
8	Lesosibirsk	Town of krai significance of Lesosibirsk	55,730
9	Nazarovo	Nazarovsky District	45,333
10	Sosnovoborsk	Town of krai significance of Sosnovoborsk	40,442

=== Demographics for 2007 ===
District	Pop	Births	Deaths	NG	BR	DR	NGR
Krasnoyarsk Krai	2,890,350	34,206	38,470	-4,264	11.83	13.31	-0.15%
Taimirsky Dolgano-Nenetsky District	37,768	592	335	257	15.67	8.87	0.68%
Evenkiysky District	16,705	304	233	71	18.20	13.95	0.43%
Abansky District	24,997	346	419	-73	13.84	16.76	-0.29%
Achinsky District	15,918	226	253	-27	14.20	15.89	-0.17%
Balakhtinsky District	23,761	281	409	-128	11.83	17.21	-0.54%
Beryozovsky District	38,527	483	543	-60	12.54	14.09	-0.16%
Birilyussky District	11,431	159	228	-69	13.91	19.95	-0.60%
Bogotolsky District	11,371	151	233	-82	13.28	20.49	-0.72%
Boguchansky District	48,312	585	626	-41	12.11	12.96	-0.08%
Bolshemurtinsky District	19,292	207	398	-191	10.73	20.63	-0.99%
Bolsheuluysky District	8,540	112	157	-45	13.11	18.38	-0.53%
Dzerzhinsky District	15,025	180	298	-118	11.98	19.83	-0.79%
Novosyolovsky District	15,128	192	226	-34	12.69	14.94	-0.22%
Partizansky District	11,003	155	233	-78	14.09	21.18	-0.71%
Pirovsky District	8,251	97	125	-28	11.76	15.15	-0.34%
Rybinsky District	23,393	309	422	-113	13.21	18.04	-0.48%
Sayansky District	13,058	163	235	-72	12.48	18.00	-0.55%
Severo-Yeniseysky District	10,907	153	136	17	14.03	12.47	0.16%
Sukhobuzimsky District	23,050	287	362	-75	12.45	15.70	-0.33%
Taseyevsky District	13,962	161	234	-73	11.53	16.76	-0.52%
Turukhansky District	20,736	249	295	-46	12.01	14.23	-0.22%
Tyukhtetsky District	9,034	111	197	-86	12.29	21.81	-0.95%
Uzhursky District	33,952	541	586	-45	15.93	17.26	-0.13%
Uyarsky District	22,255	250	495	-245	11.23	22.24	-1.10%
Idrinsky District	14,037	157	252	-95	11.18	17.95	-0.68%
Ilansky District	26,436	352	453	-101	13.32	17.14	-0.38%
Irbeysky District	18,053	241	300	-59	13.35	16.62	-0.33%
Kazachinsky District	11,333	162	191	-29	14.29	16.85	-0.26%
Sharypovsky District	17,816	244	295	-51	13.70	16.56	-0.29%
Shushensky District	35,372	392	659	-267	11.08	18.63	-0.75%
Krasnoyarsk	905,000	10,585	10,936	-351	11.70	12.08	-0.04%
Achinsk	110,838	1,333	1,702	-369	12.03	15.36	-0.33%
Bogotol	21,997	273	407	-134	12.41	18.50	-0.61%
Borodino	18,759	197	247	-50	10.50	13.17	-0.27%
Divnogorsk	30,968	337	438	-101	10.88	14.14	-0.33%
Yeniseysk	19,086	265	278	-13	13.88	14.57	-0.07%
Zaozyorny	11,359	184	221	-37	16.20	19.46	-0.33%
Kansk	98,965	1,113	1,458	-345	11.25	14.73	-0.35%
Lesosibirsk	64,215	932	1,027	-95	14.51	15.99	-0.15%
Minusinsk	66,770	852	1,141	-289	12.76	17.09	-0.43%
Nazarovo	53,593	568	890	-322	10.60	16.61	-0.60%
Norilsk	206,359	2,402	1,150	1,252	11.64	5.57	0.61%
Sosnovoborsk	30,074	306	275	31	10.17	9.14	0.10%
Sharypovo	38,495	599	583	16	15.56	15.14	0.04%
Yemelyanovsky District	45,908	493	633	-140	10.74	13.79	-0.30%
Kansky District	26,696	361	425	-64	13.52	15.92	-0.24%
Karatuzsky District	16,992	215	307	-92	12.65	18.07	-0.54%
Kezhemsky District	24,406	277	300	-23	11.35	12.29	-0.09%
Kozulsky District	18,292	225	344	-119	12.30	18.81	-0.65%
Krasnoturansky District	16,098	201	247	-46	12.49	15.34	-0.29%
Kuraginsky District	51,402	669	851	-182	13.02	16.56	-0.35%
Mansky District	17,684	226	365	-139	12.78	20.64	-0.79%
Minusinsky District	26,457	339	409	-70	12.81	15.46	-0.26%
Motyginsky District	18,152	238	257	-19	13.11	14.16	-0.10%
Nazarovsky District	23,609	390	356	34	16.52	15.08	0.14%
Yeniseysky District	27,044	353	418	-65	13.05	15.46	-0.24%
Yermakovsky District	20,621	310	360	-50	15.03	17.46	-0.24%
Nizhneingashsky District	35,886	448	597	-149	12.48	16.64	-0.42%
Other	245,202	1,673	2,020	-347	6.82	8.24	-0.14%

=== Religion ===
Religion in Krasnoyarsk Krai as of 2012 (Sreda Arena Atlas)
Russian Orthodoxy	29.6%
Other Orthodox	2.4%
Other Christians	5.7%
Islam	1.6%
Rodnovery and other native faiths	0.8%
Spiritual but not religious	35.1%
Atheism and irreligion	15%
Other and undeclared	9.8%

As per the survey conducted in 2012, 29.6% of the population of Krasnoyarsk Krai adhered to the Russian Orthodox Church, 5% declared to be a nondenominational Christian (excluding Protestant churches), 2% belonged to a different Orthodox churches, 1.5% was Muslim, 1% followed the Slavic native faith (Rodnovery), and 10.9% did not give an answer to the survey. In addition, 35% of the population declared to be "spiritual but not religious" and 15% to be atheist.

=== Education ===
Krasnoyarsk is the site of the Siberian Federal University, one of Russia's four largest educational institutions. Other notable higher education institutes of the krai are:

- Krasnoyarsk State Pedagogical University (Russian abbreviation is KGPU), founded in 1932
- Siberian State Technological University (Russian abbreviation is SibGTU), the oldest in the city, founded in 1930 as the Siberian Institute of Forestry
- Siberian State Aerospace University (Russian abbreviation is SibGAU), founded in 1960
- Krasnoyarsk State Medical University (Russian abbreviation is KrasGMU), founded in 1942
- Krasnoyarsk State Agrarian University (Russian abbreviation is Krasnoyarsk GAU), founded in 1952

== See also ==
- List of chairmen of the Legislative Assembly of Krasnoyarsk Krai
