= Zheleznogorsk, Krasnoyarsk Krai =

Closed town in Krasnoyarsk Krai, Russia

Zheleznogorsk Железногорск
- Town
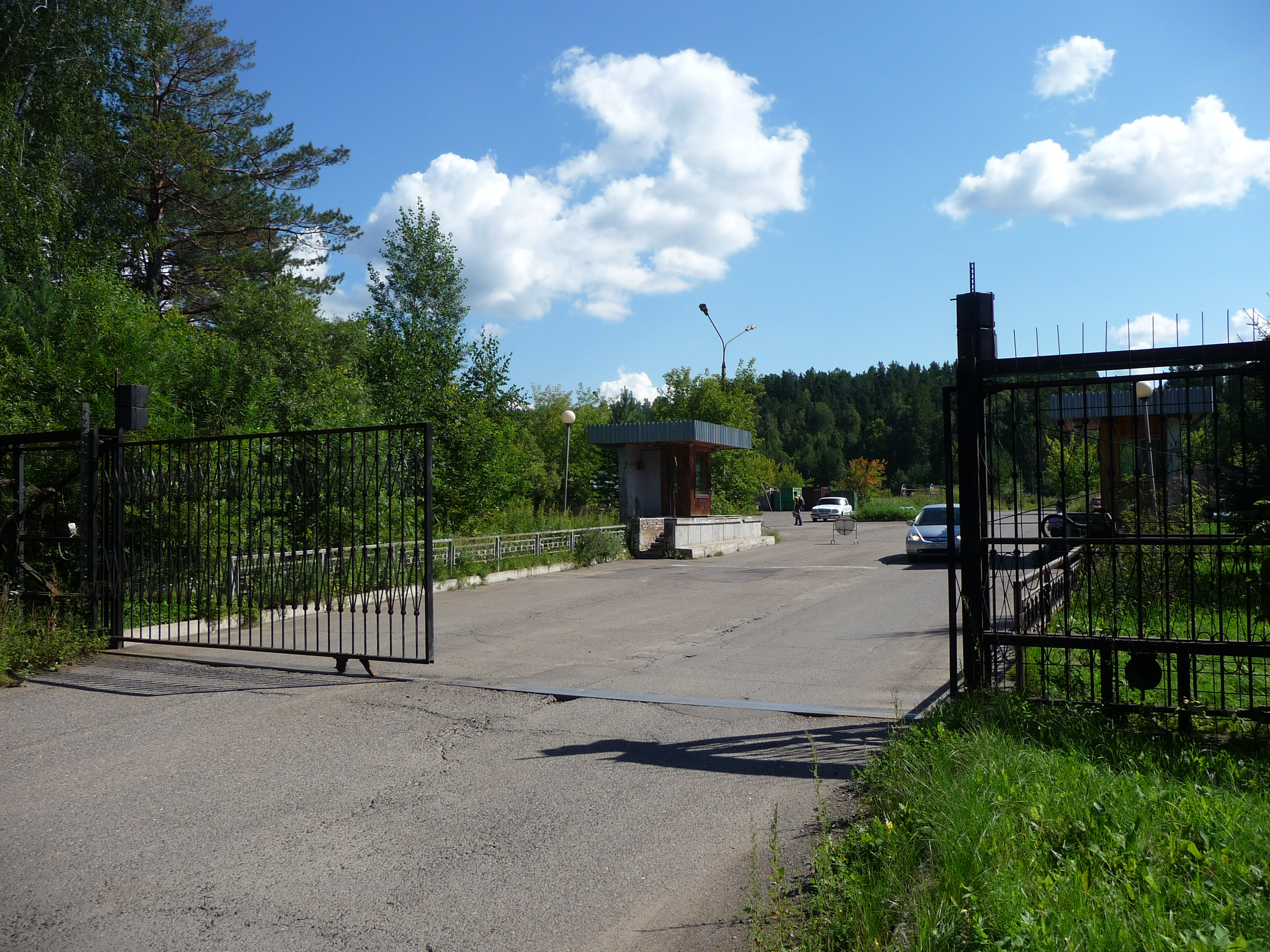
- Checkpoint at the entrance to the town

- Flag Coat of arms
- Interactive map of Zheleznogorsk
- Location of Zheleznogorsk Zheleznogorsk (Krasnoyarsk Krai)
- Coordinates: 56°15′00″N 93°32′00″E
- Country: Russia
- Federal subject: Krasnoyarsk Krai
- Founded: 1950

Government
  - Head: Igor Germanovich Kuksin
- Elevation: 150 m (490 ft)

Population (2021 Census)
  - Total: 82,723
  - Estimate (2025): 80,081 (−3.2%)
  - Rank: 197th in 2021

Administrative status
  - Subordinated to: closed administrative-territorial formation of Zheleznogorsk
  - Capital of: closed administrative-territorial formation of Zheleznogorsk

Municipal status
  - Urban okrug: Zheleznogorsk Urban Okrug
  - Capital of: Zheleznogorsk Urban Okrug
- Time zone: UTC+7 (MSK+4)
- Postal codes: 662970–662973, 662976–662978, 662980
- Dialing code: +7 39197
- OKTMO ID: 04735000001
- Website: admk26.ru

Zheleznogorsk (Russian: Железного́рск), formerly known as Krasnoyarsk-26 (Красноя́рск-26), is a closed town in Krasnoyarsk Krai, Russia, with a developed nuclear industry. The town has a population of 82,723 (2021 census).

== History ==
The town was established in 1950 for the production of weapons-grade plutonium. The history of the town and the associated defense complex are intertwined. In 1959, the government created the eastern office of OKB-1 (later known as NPO PM) under the supervision of M. F. Reshetnev. Defense plants included nuclear facilities built within caverns excavated in the granite mountain on the northern edge of the city, as well as space research enterprises.

It was a closed city until President Boris Yeltsin decreed in 1992 that such places could use their historical names. Before then, the town had not appeared on any official maps. As is the tradition with Soviet towns concealing secret facilities, "Krasnoyarsk-26" is actually a P.O. Box number and implies that the place is located some distance from the city of Krasnoyarsk. The town was also known as Soctown, Iron City, the Nine, and Atom Town.

== Administrative and municipal status ==
Within the framework of administrative divisions, it is, together with five rural localities, incorporated as the "closed administrative-territorial formation of Zheleznogorsk", an administrative unit with the status equal to that of the districts. As a municipal division, the closed administrative-territorial formation of Zheleznogorsk is incorporated as "Zheleznogorsk Urban Okrug".

Settlements under juridistion of "CATF Zheleznogorsk" include: Zheleznogorsk, Dodonovo, Podgorny, Novy Put, Tartat and Shivera.

== Geography ==
Zheleznogorsk is located 35 km north of Krasnoyarsk, in the foothills of the Atamanovsky Ridge, the spurs of the Sayan Mountains. The climate of the city, as in Krasnoyarsk, is Dfb according to Köppen. The average annual temperature is 2.2 °C or 36 °F. The city is located far from the southern border of permafrost due to the warmer climate than in most of Eastern Siberia. Mixed forests grow in the city itself, with a predominance of conifers, especially in mountainous areas. The city is also partially located in the steppe zone. Due to the high continentality of the climate, there are large temperature differences during the day and at night, as well as between winter and summer. At the same time, daytime temperatures are often higher than the average in Siberia, and nighttime temperatures from time to time are below average. The period with a positive daily average temperature slightly exceeds the period with a negative one. The maximum and minimum temperature ranges from -46°C (-51°F) to +39°C (102°F) degrees. The climate of the city is considered warmer than in Krasnoyarsk itself due to the lower elevation difference and greater penetration of warm western and southern air masses into the West Siberian Plain and the Yenisei Valley.

== Economy ==
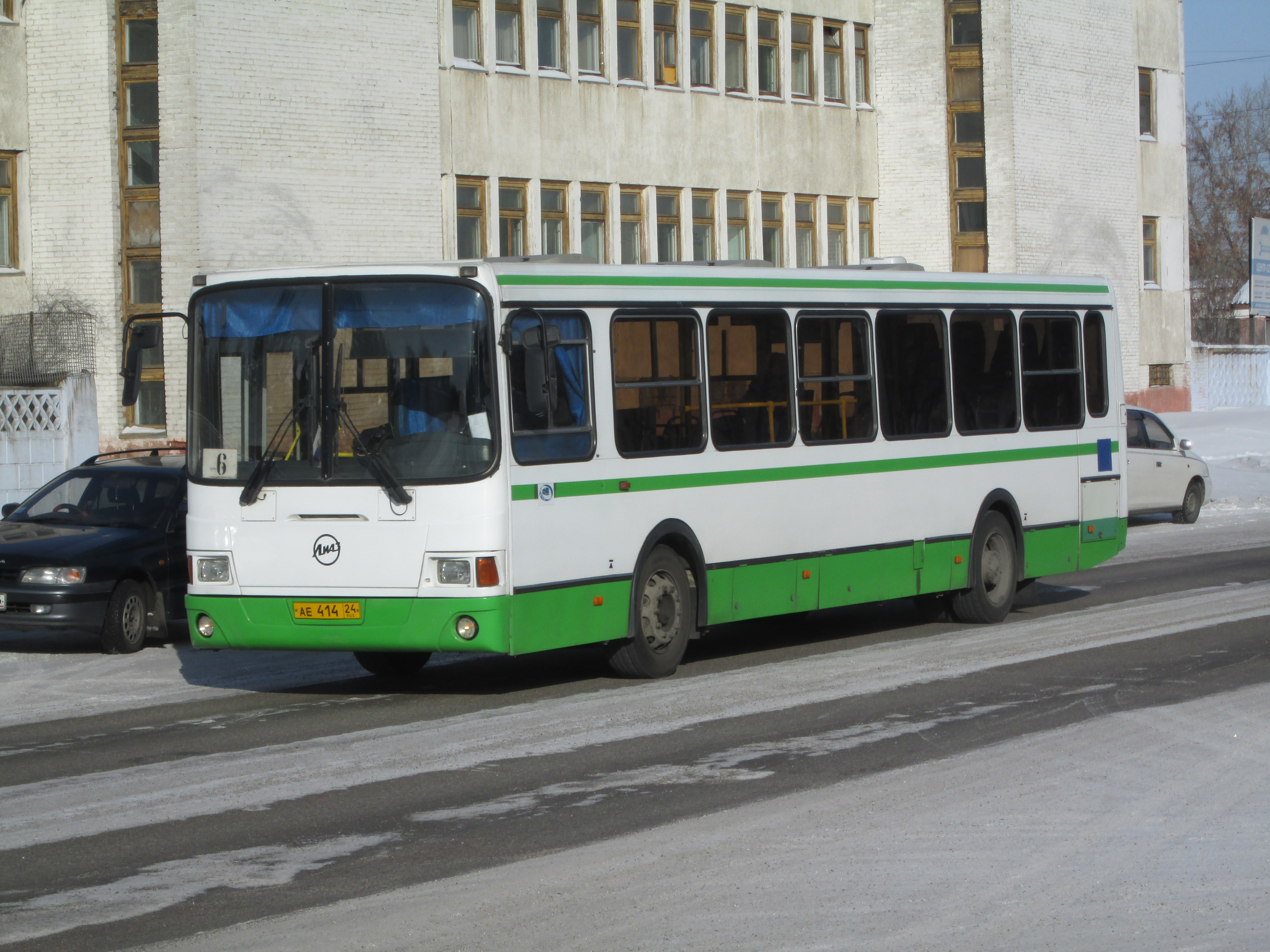
LiAZ-5256 bus

Zheleznogorsk is the location of the Krasnoyarsk Mining and Chemical Combine, a combine that played a significant role in the early Russian nuclear weapons production campaigns.

Zheleznogorsk is also the location for the production of plutonium, electricity and district heat using graphite-moderated water-cooled reactors. The last reactor was shut down permanently in April 2010. It is the location of a military reprocessing facility and for a Russian commercial nuclear-waste storage facility.

A significant employer in the city is ISS Reshetnev (Reshetnev Information Satellite Systems), Russia's largest satellite manufacturer and the prime developer of the GLONASS program.

Historical population
Year	Pop.	±%
1979	86,200	—
2002	93,875	+8.9%
2010	84,795	−9.7%
2021	82,723	−2.4%
Source: Census data

== In popular culture ==
Krasnoyarsk-26 is the setting of a key episode in the 2001 novel The Sky Is Falling by Sidney Sheldon.
