= Bogotolsky District =

Bogotolsky District Боготольский район (Russian)
- District
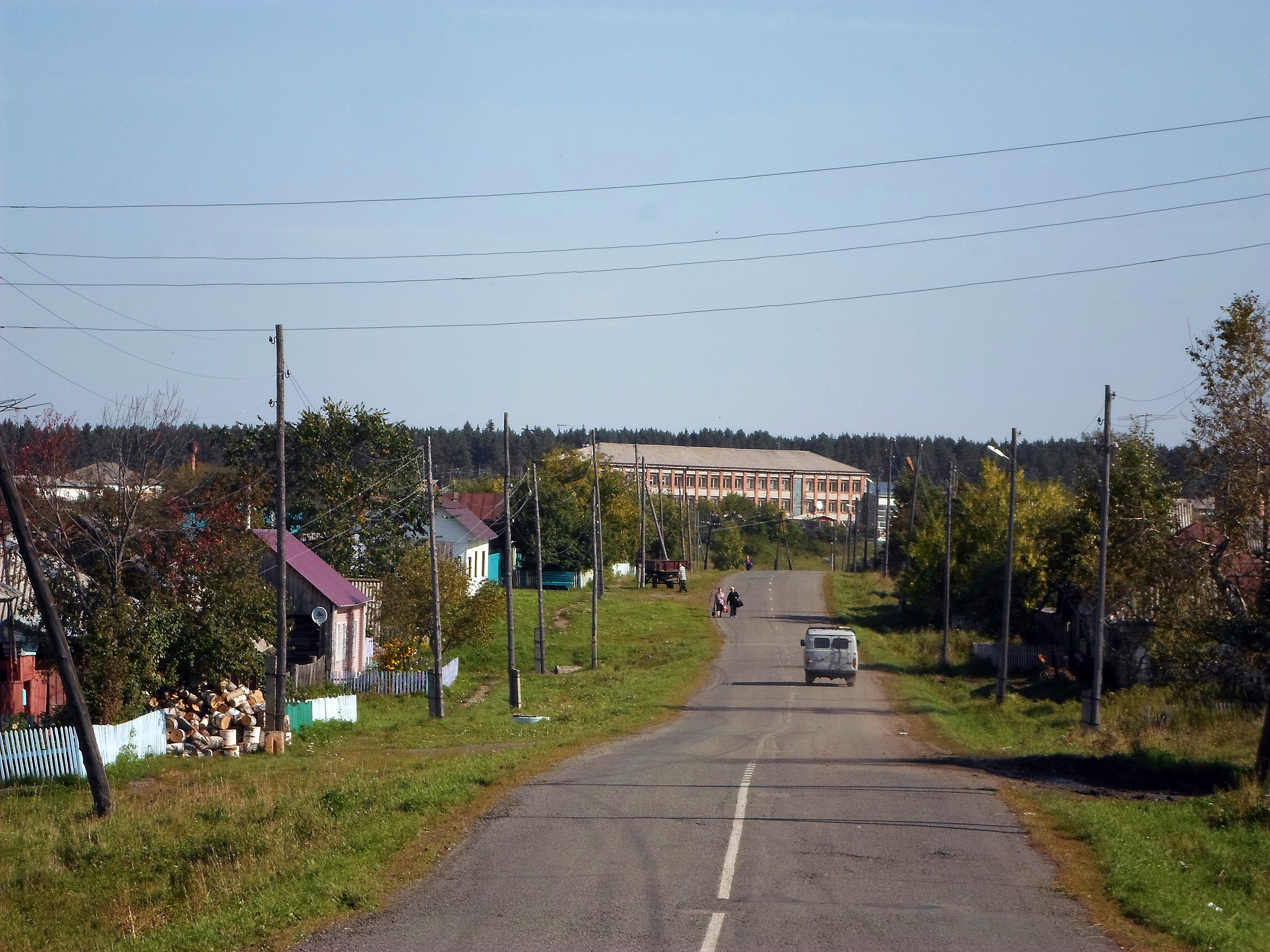
- Village (selo) Vagino, Bogotolsky District

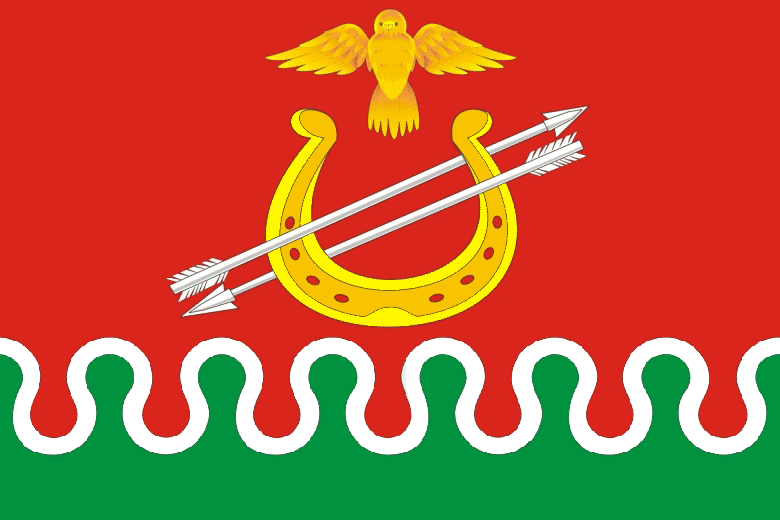
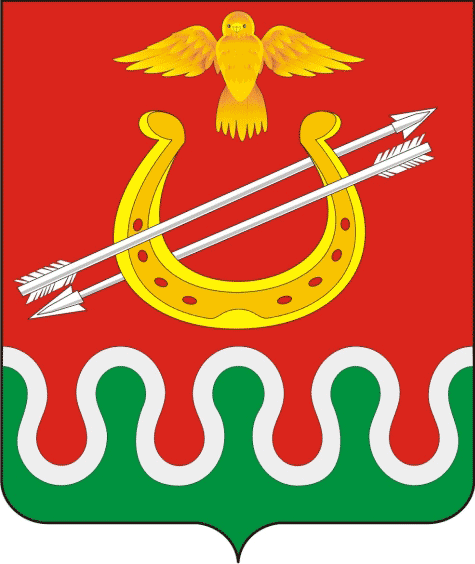
- Flag Coat of arms
- Location of Bogotolsky District in Krasnoyarsk Krai
- Coordinates: 56°N 89°E
- Country: Russia
- Federal subject: Krasnoyarsk Krai
- Established: May 25, 1925
- Administrative center: Bogotol

Government
  - Type: Local government
  - Body: Bogotolsky District Council of Deputies
  - Head: Ravil Bikbayev

Area
  - Total: 2,924 km^{2} (1,129 sq mi)

Population (2010 Census)
  - Total: 11,267
  - Density: 3.853/km^{2} (9.980/sq mi)
  - Urban: 0%
  - Rural: 100%

Administrative structure
  - Administrative divisions: 8 selsoviet
  - Inhabited localities: 38 rural localities

Municipal structure
  - Municipally incorporated as: Bogotolsky Municipal District
  - Municipal divisions: 0 urban settlements, 8 rural settlements
- Time zone: UTC+7 (MSK+4)
- OKTMO ID: 04608000
- Website: http://www.bogotol-r.ru/

Bogotolsky District (Russian: Богото́льский райо́н) is an administrative and municipal district (raion), one of the forty-three in Krasnoyarsk Krai, Russia. It is located in the southwest of the krai and borders with Tyukhtetsky District in the north, Bolsheuluysky District in the southeast, Achinsky District in the east, Nazarovsky and Sharypovsky Districts in the south, and with Kemerovo Oblast in the west. The area of the district is 2,924 square kilometers (1,129 sq mi). Its administrative center is the town of Bogotol (which is not administratively a part of the district). Population: 11,267 (2010 census); 12,415 (2002 Census); 14,978 (1989 Soviet census).

== History ==
The history of the district dates back to the formation of the settlement of Bogotolsky (modern Bogotol); presumably, in 1703. In the 17th century, the territory of what is now Bogotolsky District was settled by the Turkic tribes (Chulym Tatars). The name "Bogotol" (meaning a small beautiful valley) was borrowed from the language of those tribes.

Russians settled this area in the end of the 17th century. Peasants were engaged in agriculture and cattle breeding.

The modern district was founded on May 25, 1925.

== Administrative and municipal status ==
Within the framework of administrative divisions, Bogotolsky District is one of the forty-three in the krai. The town of Bogotol serves as its administrative center, despite being incorporated separately as a krai town—an administrative unit with the status equal to that of the districts. The district is divided into eight selsoviets.

As a municipal division, the district is incorporated as Bogotolsky Municipal District and is divided into eight rural settlements (corresponding to the administrative district's selsoviets). The krai town of Bogotol is incorporated separately from the district as Bogotol Urban Okrug.

== Economy ==
=== Transportation ===
The Trans-Siberian Railway runs through district territory from west to east. Part of the federal highway M53 passes through the district as well.
