= Lesosibirsk =

Lesosibirsk Лесосибирск
- Town
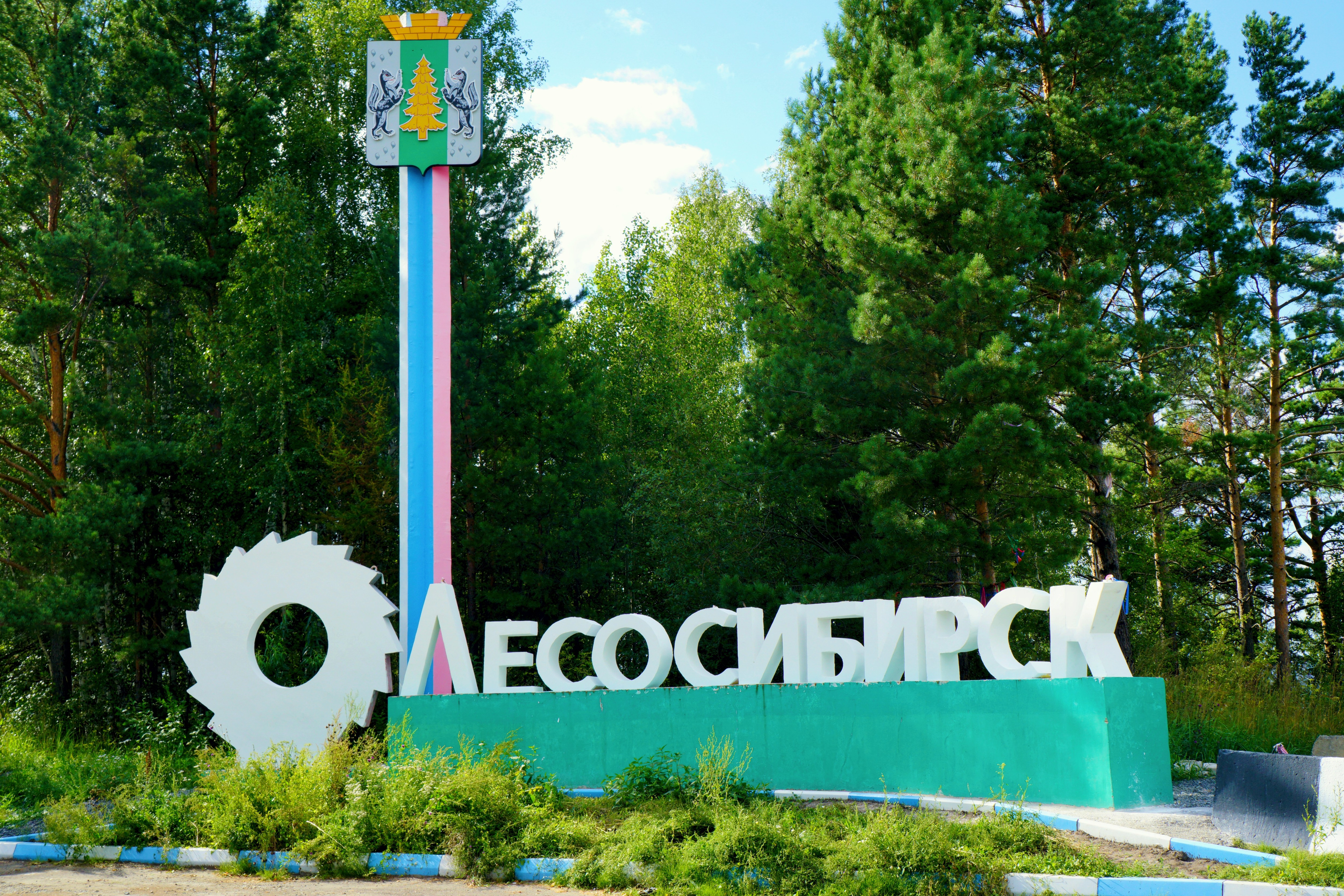
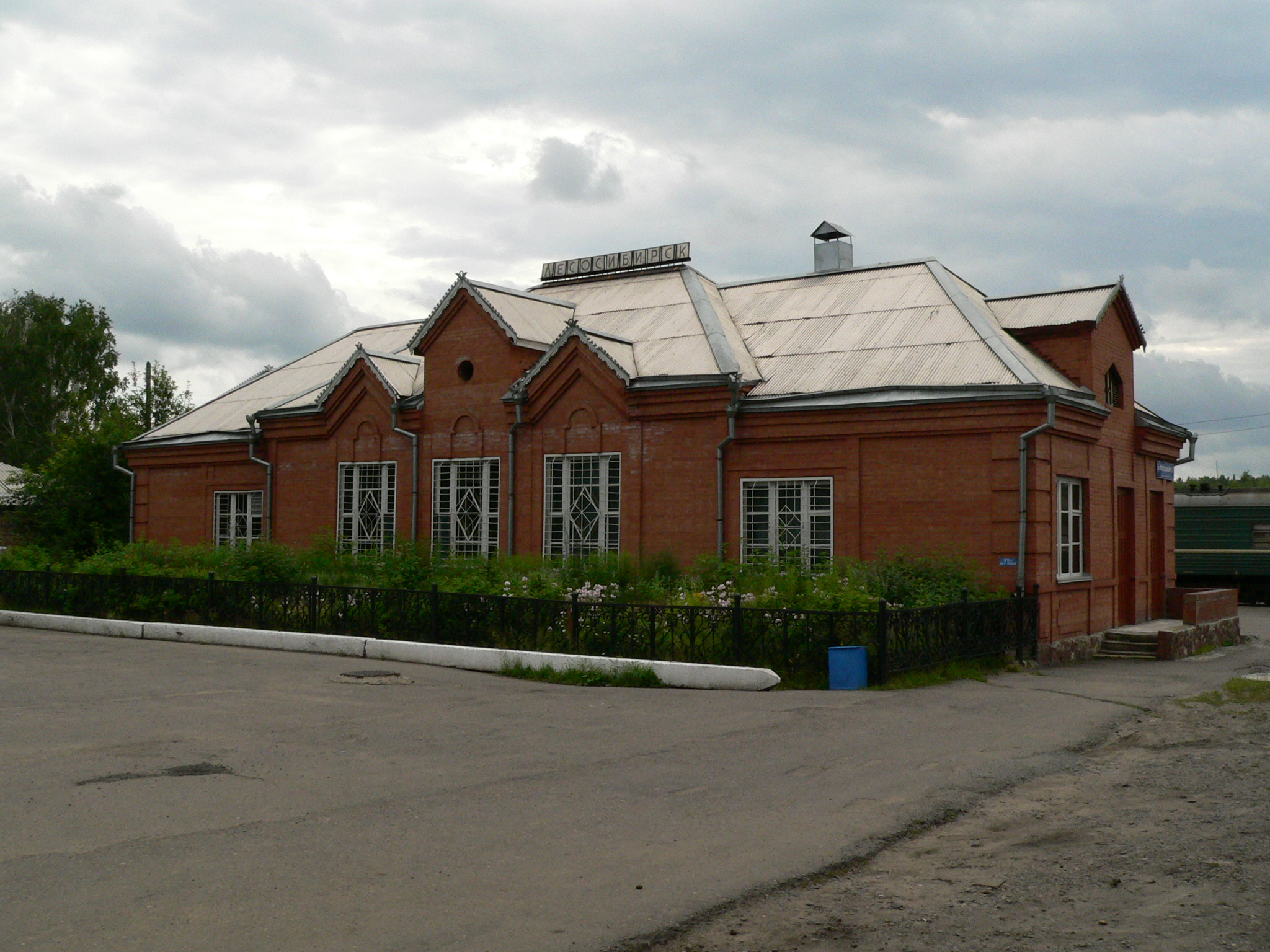
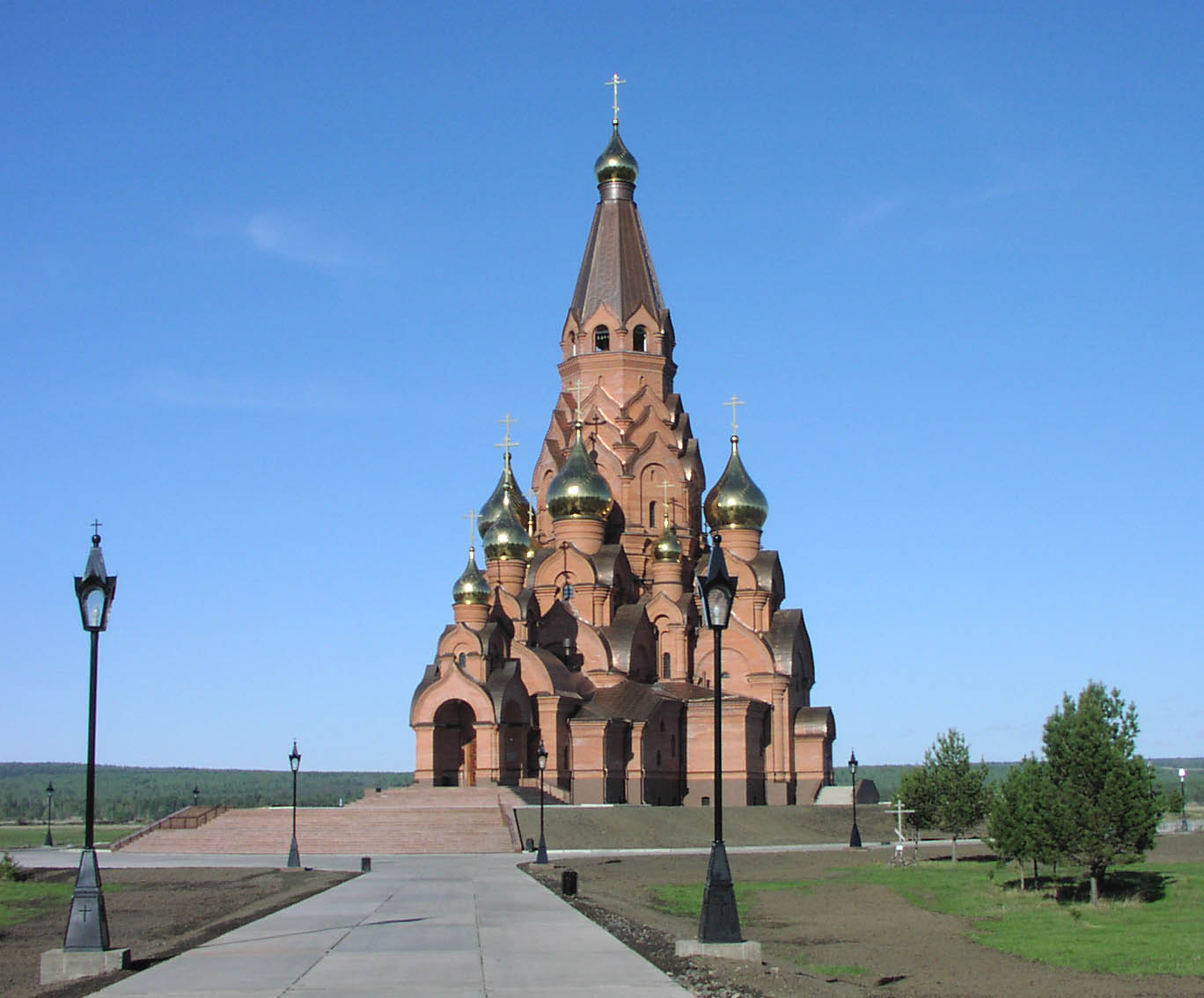
- Top-down, left-to-right: City gate sign; Lesosibirsk railway station; Krestovozdvigenskiy orthodox temple

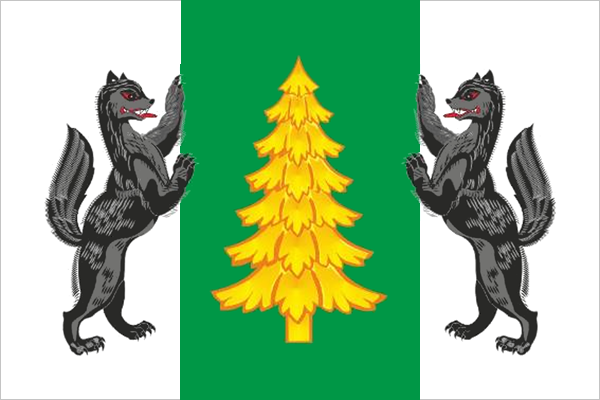
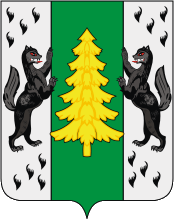
- Flag Coat of arms
- Interactive map of Lesosibirsk
- Location of Lesosibirsk Lesosibirsk (Krasnoyarsk Krai)
- Coordinates: 58°14′09″N 92°28′58″E
- Country: Russia
- Federal subject: Krasnoyarsk Krai
- Founded: February 21, 1975
- Town status since: February 21, 1975
- Elevation: 80 m (260 ft)

Population (2010 Census)
  - Total: 61,139
  - Estimate (2025): 54,451 (−10.9%)
  - Rank: 266th in 2010

Administrative status
  - Subordinated to: krai town of Lesosibirsk
  - Capital of: krai town of Lesosibirsk

Municipal status
  - Urban okrug: Lesosibirsk Urban Okrug
  - Capital of: Lesosibirsk Urban Okrug
- Time zone: UTC+7 (MSK+4)
- Postal codes: 662540, 662541, 662543, 662544, 662546–662549
- Dialing code: +7 39145
- OKTMO ID: 04722000001
- Website: lesosibirsk.krskstate.ru

Lesosibirsk (Russian: Лесосиби́рск) is a town in Krasnoyarsk Krai, Russia, located on the Yenisei River. Population: 61,139 (2010 census); 65,374 (2002 census); 68,349 (1989 Soviet census).

== History ==
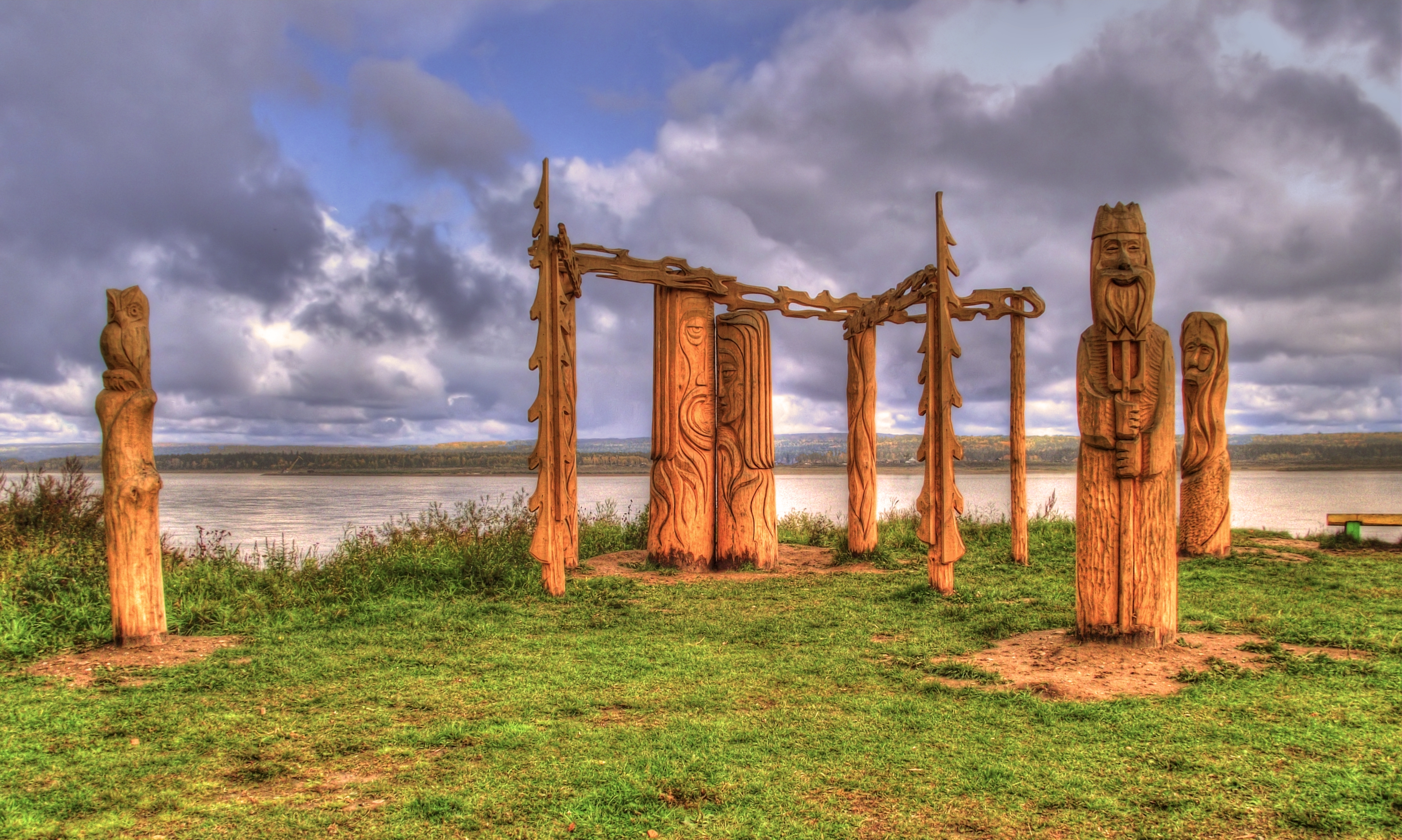
Wooden sculpture in Lesosibirsk

The village of Maklakov Lug (Russian: Маклаков Луг), later known as Maklakovo (Маклаково) existed on the territory of modern Lesosibirsk since 1640. In the early 20th century, Norwegian industrialist Jonas Lied established a wood processing plant here. The plant was nationalized after the revolution. After World War II, large wood-processing plants were built here. The Achinsk–Maklakovo railway connected the area with the Siberian Railway. Two new settlements, Novomaklakovo and Novoyeniseysk were built in the area. On February 21, 1975, the settlements of Maklakovo and Novomaklakovo were merged into the new town of Lesosibirsk. The settlement of Novoyeniseysk was merged into Lesosibirsk in 1989.

== Demographics ==
Historical population
Year	Pop.	±%
1959	16,262	—
1970	36,089	+121.9%
1979	56,476	+56.5%
1989	68,342	+21.0%
2002	65,374	−4.3%
2010	61,139	−6.5%
2021	55,730	−8.8%
Source: Census data

== Administrative and municipal status ==
Within the framework of administrative divisions, it is, together with the urban-type settlement of Strelka and one rural locality (the settlement of Ust-Angarsk), incorporated as the krai town of Lesosibirsk—an administrative unit with the status equal to that of the districts. As a municipal division, the krai town of Lesosibirsk is incorporated as Lesosibirsk Urban Okrug.
