= Sosnovoborsk, Penza Oblast =

Sosnovoborsk Сосновоборск
- Urban-type settlement
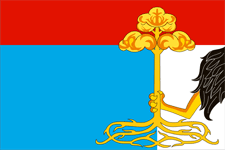
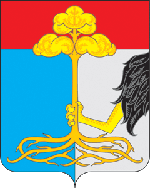
- Flag Coat of arms
- Interactive map of Sosnovoborsk
- Location of Sosnovoborsk Sosnovoborsk (Penza Oblast)
- Coordinates: 53.2942°N 46.2462°E
- Country: Russia
- Federal subject: Penza Oblast
- Administrative district: Sosnovoborsky District

Population (2010 Census)
  - Total: 6,546
  - Estimate (2021): 5,845 (−10.7%)
- Time zone: UTC+3 (MSK)
- Postal code: 442571
- OKTMO ID: 56657151051

Sosnovoborsk (Russian: Сосновоборск) is an urban locality (an urban-type settlement) in Sosnovoborsky District of Penza Oblast, Russia. Population: 6,546 (2010 census); 7,397 (2002 census); 8,087 (1989 Soviet census).
