= Strelka, Amur Oblast =

Strelka Стрелка
- Settlement
- Location within Amur Oblast Location within Russia
- Coordinates: 54°18′N 124°27′E
- Country: Russia
- Region: Amur Oblast
- District: Tyndinsky District
- Time zone: UTC+9:00

Strelka (Russian: Стрелка) is a rural locality (a settlement) in Solovyovsky Selsoviet of Tyndinsky District, Amur Oblast, Russia. The population was 1 as of 2018.

== Geography ==
It is located 9 km north from Solovyovsk.
