= Sosnovoborsky District =

Sosnovoborsky District Сосновоборский район (Russian)
- District
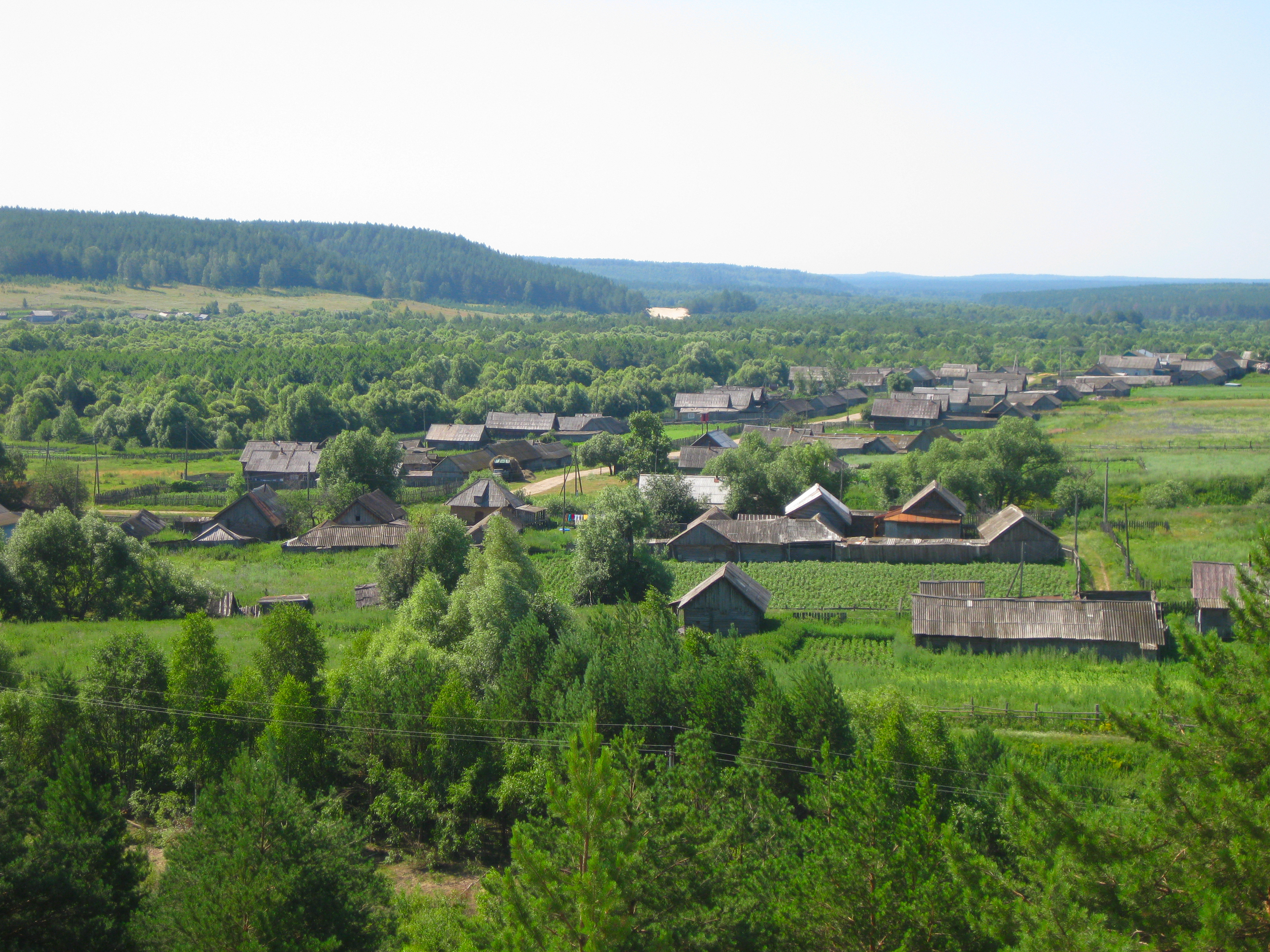
- Village in Sosnovoborsky District

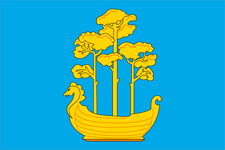
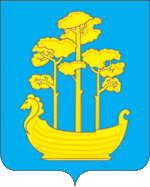
- Flag Coat of arms
- Location of Sosnovoborsky District in Penza Oblast
- Coordinates: 53°17′49″N 46°15′05″E
- Country: Russia
- Federal subject: Penza Oblast
- Established: 16 July 1928
- Administrative center: Sosnovoborsk

Area
  - Total: 1,567 km^{2} (605 sq mi)

Population (2010 Census)
  - Total: 17,242
  - Density: 11.00/km^{2} (28.50/sq mi)
  - Urban: 38.0%
  - Rural: 62.0%

Administrative structure
  - Administrative divisions: 1 Work settlements, 13 Selsoviets
  - Inhabited localities: 1 urban-type settlements, 44 rural localities

Municipal structure
  - Municipally incorporated as: Sosnovoborsky Municipal District
  - Municipal divisions: 1 urban settlements, 13 rural settlements
- Time zone: UTC+3 (MSK)
- OKTMO ID: 56657000
- Website: http://rsosnov.pnzreg.ru/

Sosnovoborsky District (Russian: Сосновобо́рский райо́н) is an administrative and municipal district (raion), one of the twenty-seven in Penza Oblast, Russia. It is located in the east of the oblast. The area of the district is 1,567 square kilometers (605 sq mi). Its administrative center is the urban locality (a work settlement) of Sosnovoborsk. Population: 17,242 (2010 Census); 20,510 (2002 census); 23,930 (1989 Soviet census). The population of Sosnovoborsk accounts for 38.0% of the district's total population.
