= Strelka, Voronezh Oblast =

Strelka Стрелка
- Khutor
- Location within Voronezh Oblast Location within Russia
- Coordinates: 51°02′N 39°45′E
- Country: Russia
- Region: Voronezh Oblast
- District: Liskinsky District
- Time zone: UTC+3:00

Strelka (Russian: Стрелка) is a rural locality (a khutor) in Nizhneikoretskoye Rural Settlement, Liskinsky District, Voronezh Oblast, Russia. The population was 265 as of 2010.

== Geography ==
Strelka is located 25 km northeast of Liski (the district's administrative centre) by road. Sredny Ikorets is the nearest rural locality.
