= Strelka, Lesosibirsk, Krasnoyarsk Krai =

Strelka Стрелка
- Urban-type settlement
- Interactive map of Strelka
- Location of Strelka Strelka (Krasnoyarsk Krai)
- Coordinates: 58°04′46″N 93°01′55″E
- Country: Russia
- Federal subject: Krasnoyarsk Krai
- Founded: 1647
- Urban-type settlement status since: 1947

Population (2010 Census)
  - Total: 5,040
  - Estimate (2025): 3,855 (−23.5%)

Administrative status
  - Subordinated to: krai town of Lesosibirsk
  - Capital of

Municipal status
  - Urban okrug: Lesosibirsk Urban Okrug
  - Capital of
- Time zone: UTC+7 (MSK+4)
- Postal codes: 662540, 662541, 662543, 662544, 662546–662549
- Dialing code: +7 39145
- OKTMO ID: 04722000056

Strelka (Russian: Стре́лка) is an urban locality (an urban-type settlement) under the administrative jurisdiction of the Town of Lesosibirsk in Krasnoyarsk Krai, Russia. Population: 5,040 (2010 census); 5,767 (2002 census); 7,187 (1989 Soviet census)..

== Administrative and municipal status ==
Within the framework of administrative divisions, it is, together with the urban-type settlement of Strelka and one rural locality (the settlement of Ust-Angarsk), incorporated as the krai town of Lesosibirsk—an administrative unit with the status equal to that of the districts. The urban-type settlement of Strelka and the rural locality of Ust-Angarsk is incorporated as Lesosibirsk Urban Okrug.
