= Strelka, Vologda Oblast =

Strelka Стрелка
- Village
- Location within Vologda Oblast Location within Russia
- Coordinates: 60°34′N 45°02′E
- Country: Russia
- Region: Vologda Oblast
- District: Nyuksensky District
- Time zone: UTC+3:00

Strelka (Russian: Стрелка) is a rural locality (a village) in Vostrovskoye Rural Settlement, Nyuksensky District, Vologda Oblast, Russia. The population was 2 as of 2002.

== Geography ==
Strelka is located 72 km northeast of Nyuksenitsa (the district's administrative centre) by road. Pustyn is the nearest rural locality.
