= Uyar =

Uyar may refer to:

== People ==
- Anıl Uyar (born 1980), Turkish ice hockey player and coach
- Çağıl Uyar (born 1986), Turkish ice hockey player
- Salih Uyar, a citizen of Turkey held in extrajudicial detention in Guatanamo Bay
- Yücel Uyar (born 1960), Turkish football manager and former footballer

== Places ==
- Uyar Urban Settlement, a municipal formation which the district town of Uyar in Uyarsky District of Krasnoyarsk Krai, Russia is incorporated as
- Uyar (inhabited locality), several inhabited localities in Russia

== Other uses ==
- UY-AR, ISO 3166-2 code for Artigas Department in Uruguay

== See also ==
- Uyarsky District, a district of Krasnoyarsk Krai, Russia
