= Kazachinsky =

Kazachinsky (masculine), Kazachinskaya (feminine), or Kazachinskoye (neuter) may refer to:

- Kazachinsky District, a district of Krasnoyarsk Krai, Russia
- Kazachinsky District, name of Kazachinsko-Lensky District of Irkutsk Oblast, Russia in 1926–1930
- Kazachinskoye, several rural localities in Russia
- Kazachinskoye Airport, a regional airport in Irkutsk Oblast, Russia
