= Severo-Yeniseysky =

Severo-Yeniseysky (masculine), Severo-Yeniseyskaya (feminine), or Severo-Yeniseyskoye (neuter) may refer to:

- Severo-Yeniseysky District, a district of Krasnoyarsk Krai, Russia
- Severo-Yeniseysky (urban-type settlement), an urban locality (an urban-type settlement) in Krasnoyarsk Krai, Russia
