= Pirovsky =

Pirovsky (masculine), Pirovskaya (feminine), or Pirovskoye (neuter) may refer to:

- Pirovsky District, a district in Krasnoyarsk Krai, Russia
- Pirovskoye, a rural locality (a selo); the administrative center of Pirovsky District
