= Klyukvenny =

Klyukvenny (Russian: Клюквенный; masculine), Klyukvennaya (Клюквенная; feminine), or Klyukvennoye (Клюквенное; neuter) is the name of several rural localities in Russia.

Modern localities

- Klyukvenny, Altai Krai, a settlement in Gordeyevsky Selsoviet of Troitsky District of Altai Krai; 53°11′N 84°57′E
- Klyukvenny, Moscow Oblast, a settlement in Ogudnevskoye Rural Settlement of Shchyolkovsky District of Moscow Oblast
- Klyukvennoye, Kaliningrad Oblast, a settlement in Krasnotorovsky Rural Okrug of Zelenogradsky District of Kaliningrad Oblast
- Klyukvennoye, Kurgan Oblast, a selo in Saratovsky Selsoviet of Makushinsky District of Kurgan Oblast
- Klyukvennaya, Kurgan Oblast, a village in Medvedsky Selsoviet of Shchuchansky District of Kurgan Oblast

Renamed localities

- Klyukvennaya, former name of Uyar, a town in Uyarsky District of Krasnoyarsk Krai
