= Kazachinskoye =

Kazachinsky (Russian: Казачинский; masculine), Kazachinskaya (Казачинская; feminine), or Kazachinskoye (Казачинское; neuter) is the name of several rural localities in Russia:

- Kazachinskoye, Irkutsk Oblast, a selo in Kazachinsko-Lensky District of Irkutsk Oblast; 56°16′N 07°34′E
- Kazachinskoye, Krasnoyarsk Krai, a selo in Kazachinsky Selsoviet of Kazachinsky District in Krasnoyarsk Krai
