= Uyar (inhabited locality) =

Uyar (Russian: Уяр) is the name of several inhabited localities in Krasnoyarsk Krai, Russia.

Urban localities

- Uyar, Uyarsky District, Krasnoyarsk Krai, a town in Uyarsky District

Rural localities

- Uyar, Krasnoturansky District, Krasnoyarsk Krai, a village in Bellyksky Selsoviet of Krasnoturansky District
