= Beryozovka, Beryozovsky District, Krasnoyarsk Krai =

Beryozovka Берёзовка
- Urban-type settlement
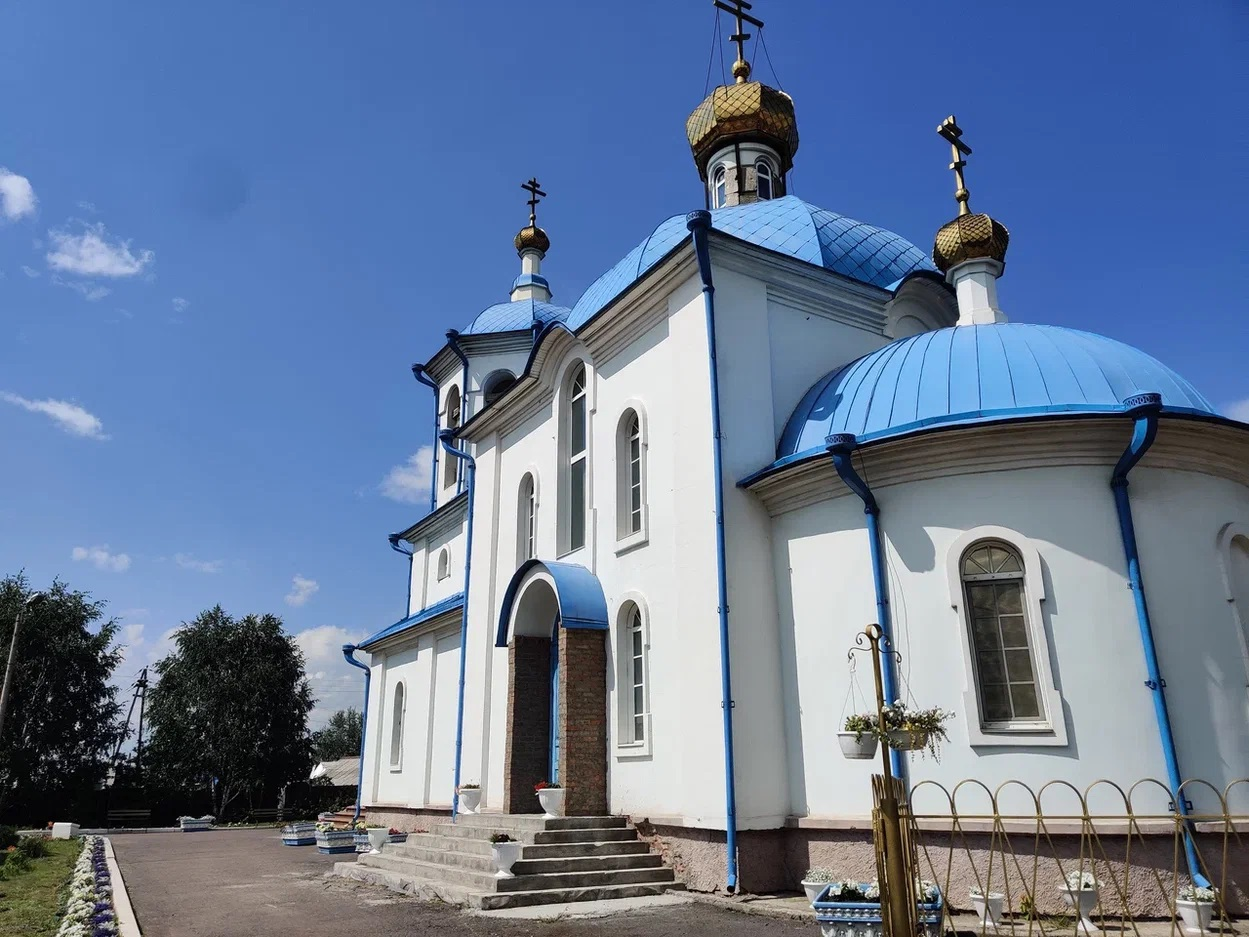

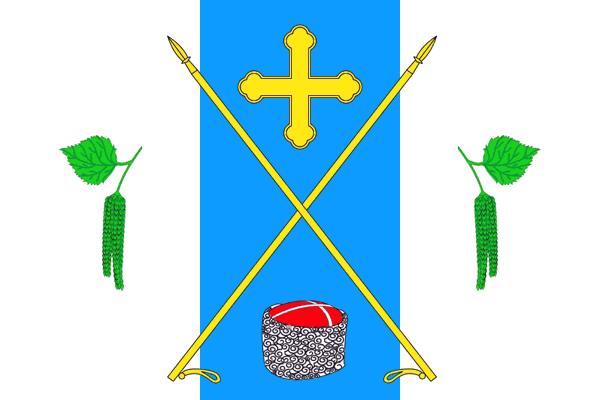
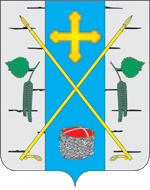
- Flag Coat of arms
- Interactive map of Beryozovka
- Location of Beryozovka Beryozovka (Krasnoyarsk Krai)
- Coordinates: 56.0355°N 93.1371°E
- Country: Russia
- Federal subject: Krasnoyarsk Krai
- Administrative district: Beryozovsky District
- Founded: 1639

Population (2010 Census)
  - Total: 20,887
  - Estimate (2025): 18,715 (−10.4%)
- Time zone: UTC+7 (MSK+4)
- Postal codes: 662520, 662521
- OKTMO ID: 04605151051

Beryozovka (Russian: Берёзовка) is an urban locality (an urban-type settlement) in Beryozovsky District of Krasnoyarsk Krai, Russia. Population: 20,887 (2010 census); 21,346 (2002 census); 20,766 (1989 Soviet census).The settlement borders Krasnoyarsk and is a close part of its metro area. Beryozovka is being served by Krasnoyarsk city transit system as well as some regional bus routes.

== History ==
The settlement was founded in 1639 in connection with the construction of the Vvedensky Monastery (it was built as an almshouse for the sick and crippled Cossacks of the Krasnoyarsk burg), since 1678 - a village. 1639 went down in history as the year of the founding of Berezovka. It was in this year that the monks of the Spassky Monastery from Yeniseisk, Ivan and Gerasim, bought land from Ataman Miloslav Koltsov at the mouth of the Berezovka River for the construction of the Vvedensky Monastery.

However, as the facts testify, the first settlements of the Cossacks appeared on the Beryozovska land a few years before this historical event. The founders of Berezovka are considered to be the Cossacks who came to Siberia together with Andrei Dubensky: Shumka Vostrykh, Dementy Zlobin - their names remained in the history of the village in the names of streets and microdistricts.

In 1678, a church was built in the monastery, and Berezovka received the status of a village.

With the introduction of volost government in Siberia in 1735, the village of Berezovka became the center of the Berezovskaya volost. At the same time, the Moskovsky tract was being built through the village, linking Moscow with Irkutsk (it passed through today's streets of Oleinikov and the Soviet Army). In 1768, the Vvedensky Monastery in Berezovsky was closed, and the volost center was transferred to the village of Ladeyskoye.

In 1821 a stone temple was built in the village, and in 1840 a crossing across the Yenisei was created. The revival of the former glory of the Berezovka land is associated with the construction of a pontoons in 1840 and the opening of a ferry across the Yenisei.

In July 1891, returning from a trip around the world, Berezovka was visited by another famous guest - Tsarevich Nikolai.

In 1924–1936, a village in the Krasnoyarsk region of the Yenisei province (1924-1925), the Siberian Territory (1925-1930), the East Siberian Territory (1930-1934), the Krasnoyarsk Territory (1934-1936). With the advent of Soviet power, district territorial division was introduced instead of volosts, and in 1925 the Berezovsky lands became part of the Krasnoyarsk rural district.

In 1936–1963. the regional center of the Soviet district of the Krasnoyarsk Territory. In 1937, the Krasnoyarsk village council was liquidated, and two districts were created on its basis: Emelyanovsky and Sovetsky with a center in Berezovka. The population of the village at that time was only 1734 people.

The history of the village reflects all the events and processes that took place in those years in the Soviet Union. Berezovka, along with all the strange, survived collectivization, fought against Nazi Germany. Only according to official data in the Great Patriotic War of 1941–1945. more than 4.5 thousand Beryozovtsy took part.

In 1963–1983, a village in the Yemelyanovsky district of the Krasnoyarsk Territory. In 1966, the village of Berezovka was given the status of a working settlement, which included the following settlements: Berezovka, Zlobino, Kozhevenka, Shumkovo, Chudovo and the settlements of hydroelectric power station, Mekhkolonna, Nefteprovod, Remzavod. 17 thousand people lived in the village. From that time on, Berezovka formed its own local self-government bodies.

Since 1966 it has been an urban-type settlement.

Since 1983, the regional center of the Beryozovsky district of the Krasnoyarsk Territory.

Until 1999, Berezovka was subordinate to the village of Mansky, transferred to the administration of Divnogorsk by the Law of the Krasnoyarsk Territory dated January 22, 1999 No. 5-274

== Galary ==
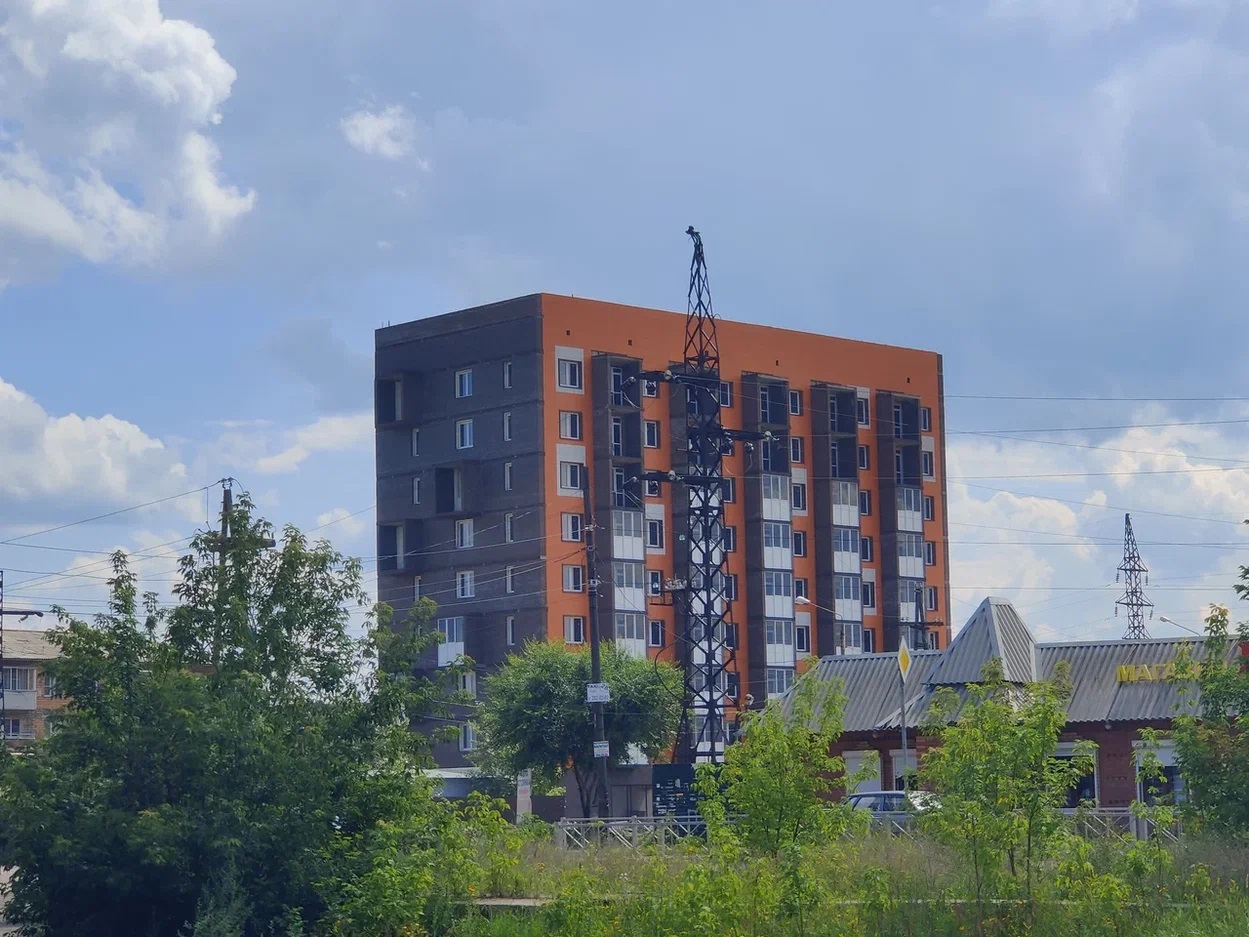
9-storey building in Beryozovka. The highest building in town

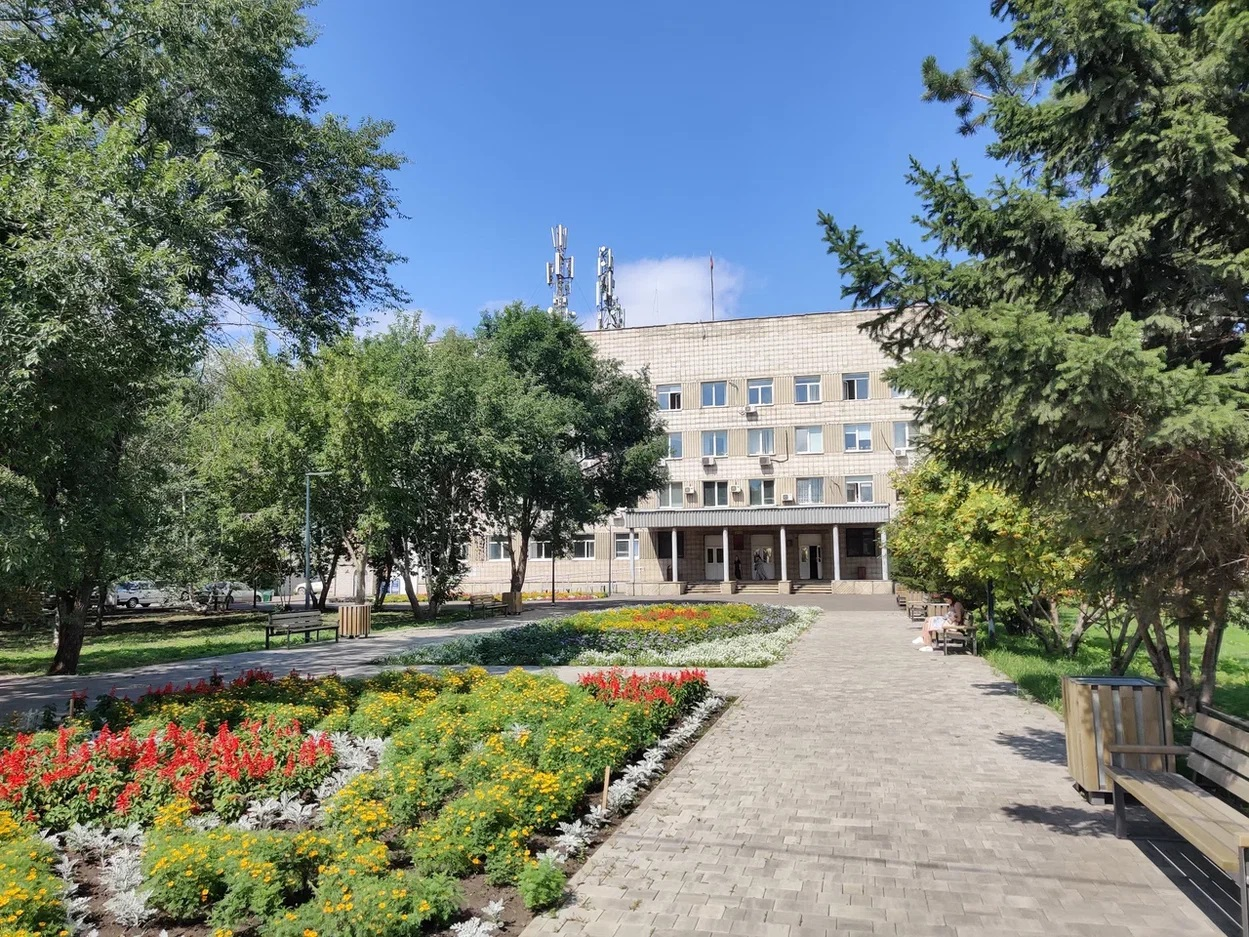
Beryozovka's local government office

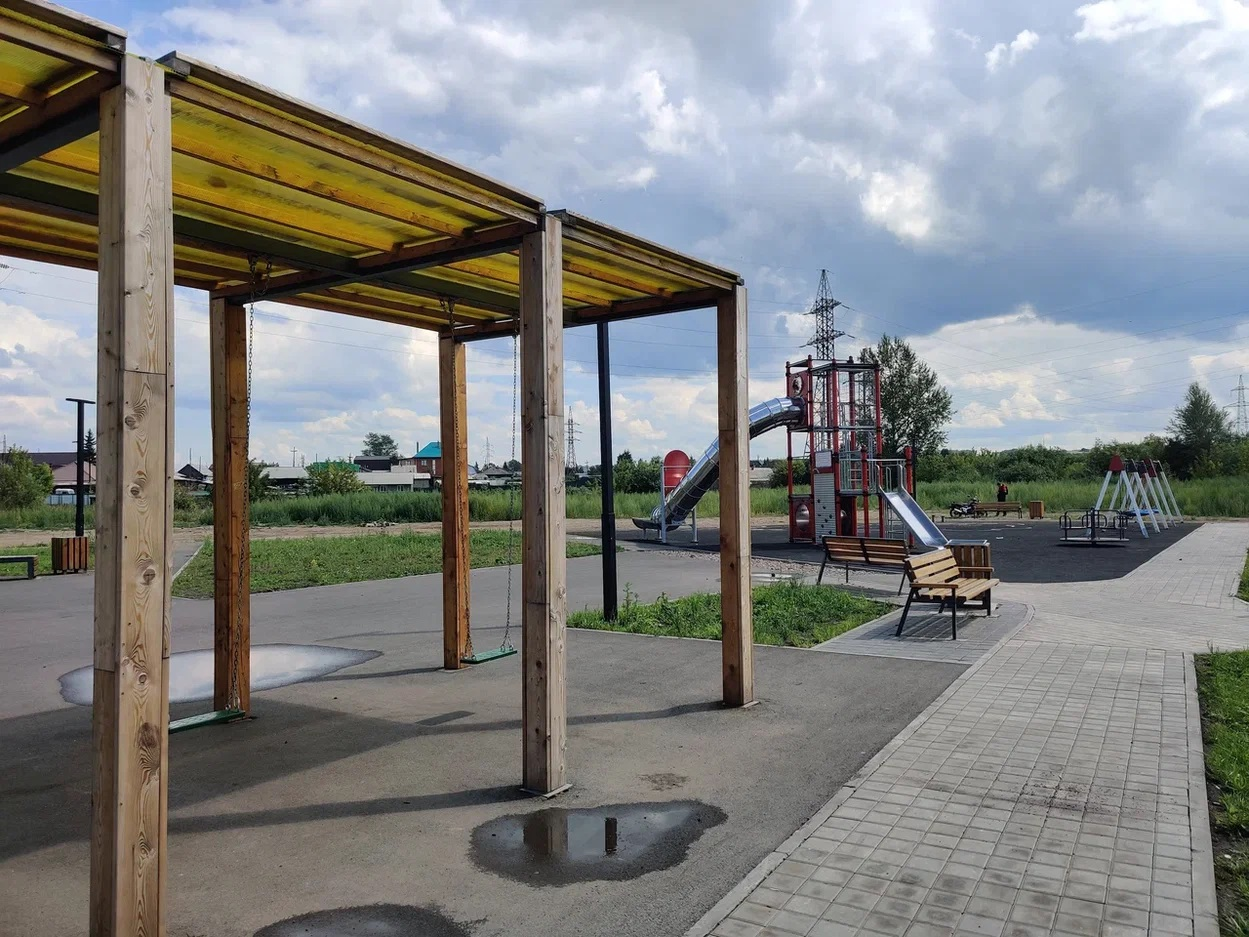
A park in Beryozovka
