= Taseyevsky District =

Taseyevsky District Тасеевский район (Russian)
- District
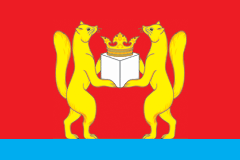
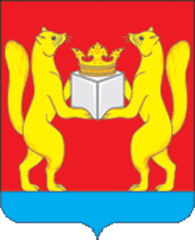
- Flag Coat of arms
- Location of Taseyevsky District in Krasnoyarsk Krai
- Coordinates: 57°12′32″N 94°53′29″E
- Country: Russia
- Federal subject: Krasnoyarsk Krai
- Established: April 4, 1924
- Administrative center: Taseyevo

Government
  - Type: Local government
  - Body: Taseyevsky District Council of Deputies
  - Head: Oleg A. Nikanorov

Area
  - Total: 9,923 km^{2} (3,831 sq mi)

Population (2010 Census)
  - Total: 13,255
  - Density: 1.336/km^{2} (3.460/sq mi)
  - Urban: 0%
  - Rural: 100%

Administrative structure
  - Administrative divisions: 8 selsoviet
  - Inhabited localities: 28 rural localities

Municipal structure
  - Municipally incorporated as: Taseyevsky Municipal District
  - Municipal divisions: 0 urban settlements, 8 rural settlements
- Time zone: UTC+7 (MSK+4)
- OKTMO ID: 04652000
- Website: http://adm.taseevo.ru/

Taseyevsky District (Russian: Тасе́евский райо́н) is an administrative and municipal district (raion), one of the forty-three in Krasnoyarsk Krai, Russia. It is located in the south of the krai and borders with Motyginsky and Boguchansky Districts in the north, Abansky District in the east, Dzerzhinsky District in the southeast, Sukhobuzimsky District in the south, and with Bolshemurtinsky and Kazachinsky Districts in the west. The area of the district is 9,923 square kilometers (3,831 sq mi). Its administrative center is the rural locality (a selo) of Taseyevo. Population: 13,255 (2010 census); 15,275 (2002 census); 18,707 (1989 Soviet census). The population of Taseyevo accounts for 60.6% of the district's total population.

== Geography ==
The district is located on the Taseyeva River.

== History ==
The district was founded on April 4, 1924.

== Divisions and government ==
As of 2013, the Head of the District and the Chairman of the District Council is Oleg A. Nikanorov.
