= Beryozovsky District, Krasnoyarsk Krai =

Beryozovsky District Берёзовский район (Russian)
- District
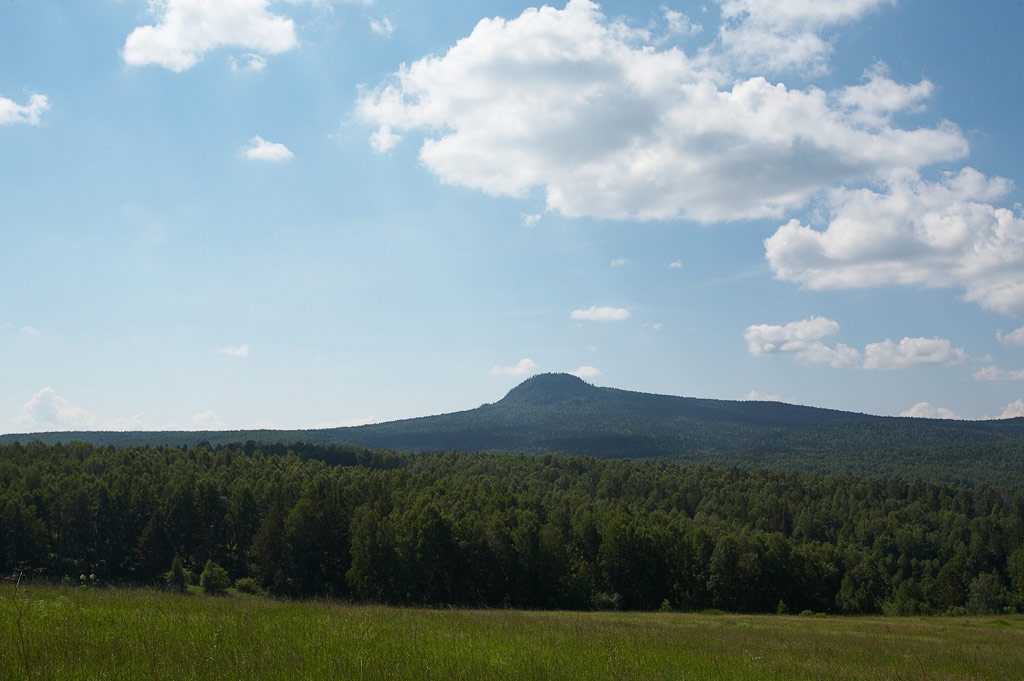
- Chernaya Sopka (an extinct volcano), Beryozovsky District

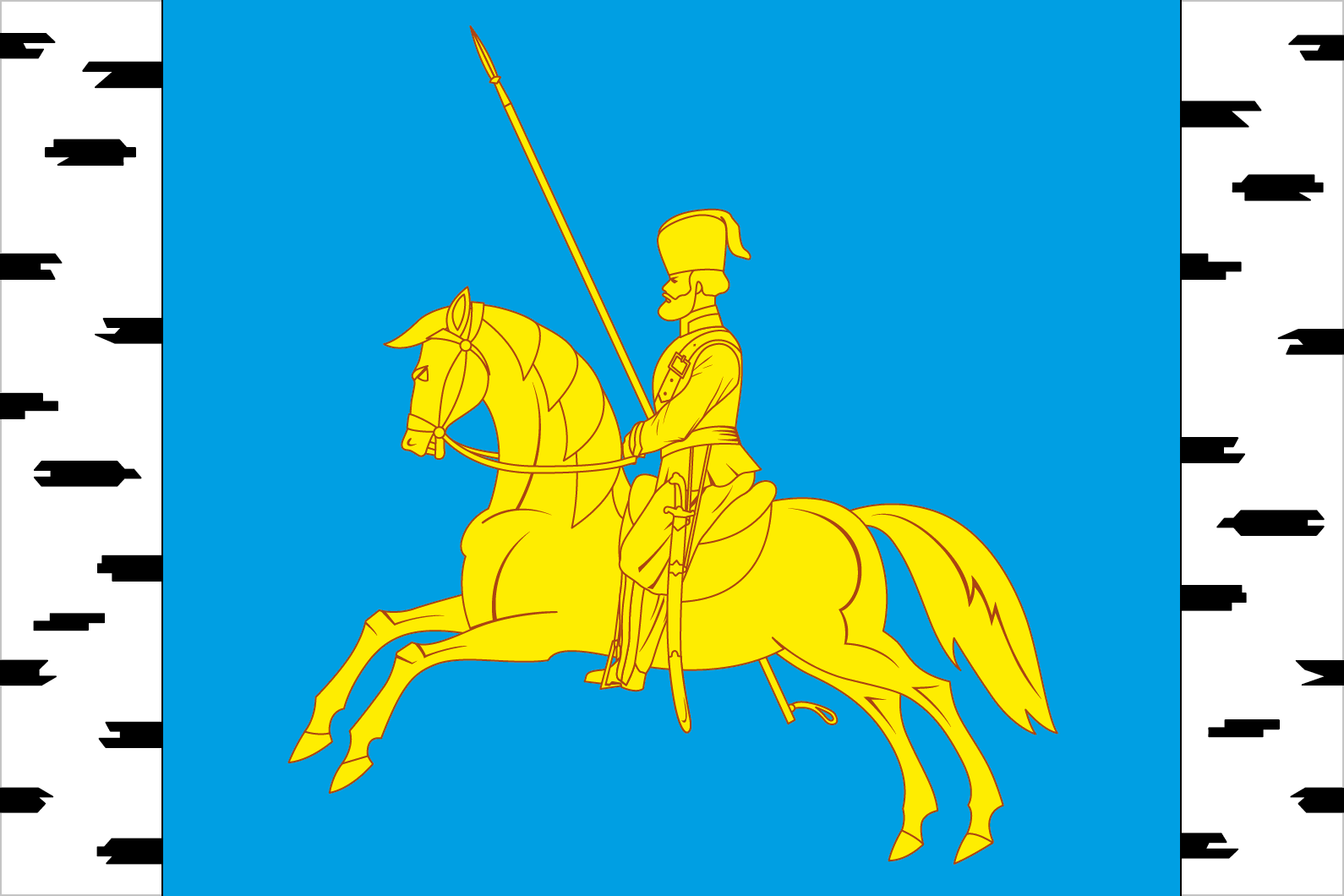
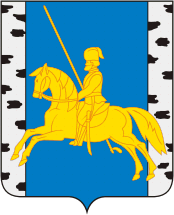
- Flag Coat of arms
- Location of Beryozovsky District in Krasnoyarsk Krai
- Coordinates: 56°01′20″N 93°06′52″E
- Country: Russia
- Federal subject: Krasnoyarsk Krai
- Established: April 25, 1983
- Administrative center: Beryozovka

Government
  - Type: Local government
  - Body: Beryozovsky District Council of Deputies
  - Head: Leonid P. Kilin

Area
  - Total: 4,244 km^{2} (1,639 sq mi)

Population (2010 Census)
  - Total: 37,868
  - Density: 8.923/km^{2} (23.11/sq mi)
  - Urban: 55.2%
  - Rural: 44.8%

Administrative structure
  - Administrative divisions: 1 Urban-type settlements, 5 Selsoviets
  - Inhabited localities: 1 urban-type settlements, 25 rural localities

Municipal structure
  - Municipally incorporated as: Beryozovsky Municipal District
  - Municipal divisions: 1 urban settlements, 5 rural settlements
- Time zone: UTC+7 (MSK+4)
- OKTMO ID: 04605000
- Website: http://berezovsky.krskstate.ru/

Beryozovsky District (Russian: Берёзовский райо́н) is an administrative and municipal district (raion), one of the forty-three in Krasnoyarsk Krai, Russia. It is located in the south of the krai and borders with Sukhobuzimsky District in the north, Rybinsky District in the east, Uyarsky District in the southeast, Mansky District in the south, Balakhtinsky District in the southwest, and with Yemelyanovsky District and the territory of the krai city of Krasnoyarsk in the west. The area of the district is 4,244 square kilometers (1,639 sq mi). Its administrative center is the urban locality (an urban-type settlement) of Beryozovka. Population: 37,868 (2010 census); 37,821 (2002 census); 40,294 (1989 Soviet census). The population of Beryozovka accounts for 55.2% of the district's total population.

== History ==
The district was founded on April 25, 1983.

== Government ==
As of 2013, the Head of the district is Leonid P. Kilin.

== Demographics ==
As of the 2002 Census, the ethnic composition of the population was as follows:

Historical population
Year	Pop.	±%
1970	39,529	—
1979	36,129	−8.6%
1989	40,294	+11.5%
2002	37,821	−6.1%
2010	37,868	+0.1%
2021	43,090	+13.8%
Source: Census data

- Russians: 89.0%
- Ukrainians: 2.6%
- Germans: 2.5%
- Belarusians: 1.6%
- Chuvash: 1.1%
- Tatars: 1.0%
- Mordvins: 0.5%

== Economy ==
The economy of the district is mostly agricultural. Leading agricultural enterprises include OOO "Sibirskaya Guberniya", OAO "Barkhatovskaya poultry farm", agricultural cooperatives "Beryozovsky", "Zykovsky", and "Yesaulsky", GUP "Krasnoyarskoye", and OOO "Maganskoye". Additionally, about two hundred farms operate in the district.

Major industrial enterprises include OAO "Beryozovsky maintenance plant", AO "Yermolayevskaya REB", OOO "Beryozovskaya furniture factory", OAO "Krasnoyarskpolimer-keramika", OOO "Zykovsky brick factory", OAO "Beton", OOO "Beryozovsky bakery plant", "Nils" factory, and others.

A developed network of railroad maintenance facilities exists in the district.

Natural resources include limestone, granite, gravel, sand, and rubble, all of which were extensively used during the construction of Krasnoyarsk Dam. OAO "Litoye" is the main developer of natural resources in the district.

A significant portion of the district population is employed in Krasnoyarsk. In turn, Krasnoyarsk residents use the district for their dachas.
