= Bolshaya Murta =

Bolshaya Murta Большая Мурта
- Urban-type settlement
- Interactive map of Bolshaya Murta
- Location of Bolshaya Murta Bolshaya Murta (Krasnoyarsk Krai)
- Coordinates: 56.9093°N 93.1393°E
- Country: Russia
- Federal subject: Krasnoyarsk Krai
- Administrative district: Bolshemurtinsky District
- Founded: 1725

Population (2010 Census)
  - Total: 7,905
  - Estimate (2025): 6,927 (−12.4%)
- Time zone: UTC+7 (MSK+4)
- Postal code: 663060
- OKTMO ID: 04610151051

Bolshaya Murta (Russian: Больша́я Мурта́) is an urban locality (an urban-type settlement) in Bolshemurtinsky District of Krasnoyarsk Krai, Russia. Population: 7,905 (2010 census); 8,435 (2002 census); 8,901 (1989 Soviet census).
