= Bolshemurtinsky District =

Bolshemurtinsky District Бальшемуртинский район (Russian)
- District
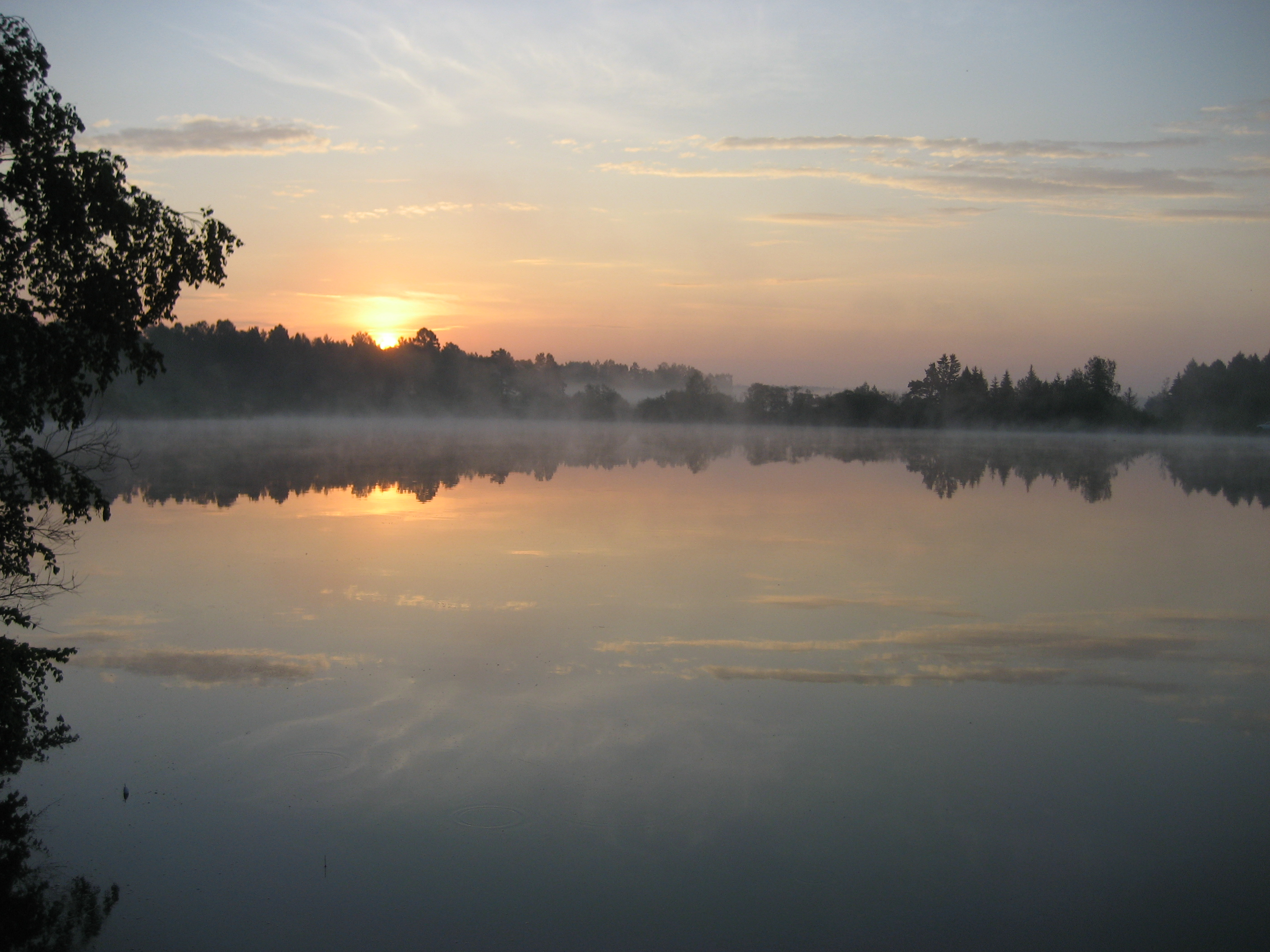
- Mist on lake in Bolshemurtinsky District

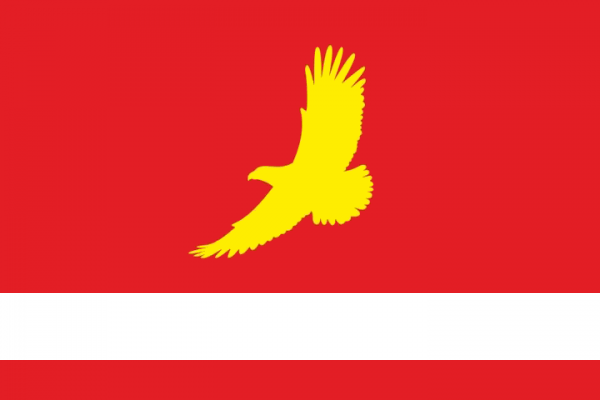
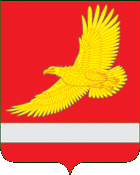
- Flag Coat of arms
- Location of Bolshemurtinsky District in Krasnoyarsk Krai
- Coordinates: 56°54′25″N 93°09′59″E
- Country: Russia
- Federal subject: Krasnoyarsk Krai
- Established: April 4, 1924
- Administrative center: Bolshaya Murta

Government
  - Type: Local government
  - Body: Bolshemurtinsky District Council of Deputies
  - Head: Valery V. Verner

Area
  - Total: 6,856 km^{2} (2,647 sq mi)

Population (2010 Census)
  - Total: 19,115
  - Density: 2.788/km^{2} (7.221/sq mi)
  - Urban: 49.9%
  - Rural: 50.1%

Administrative structure
  - Administrative divisions: 1 Urban-type settlements, 11 Selsoviets
  - Inhabited localities: 1 urban-type settlements, 37 rural localities

Municipal structure
  - Municipally incorporated as: Bolshemurtinsky Municipal District
  - Municipal divisions: 1 urban settlements, 11 rural settlements
- Time zone: UTC+7 (MSK+4)
- OKTMO ID: 04610000
- Website: http://www.bmurta.ru/

Bolshemurtinsky District (Russian: Большемурти́нский райо́н) is an administrative and municipal district (raion), one of the forty-three in Krasnoyarsk Krai, Russia. It is located in the southern central part of the krai and borders with Kazachinsky District in the north, Taseyevsky District in the east, Sukhobuzimsky and Yemelyanovsky Districts in the south, Birilyussky District in the west, and with Pirovsky District in the northwest. The area of the district is 6,856 square kilometers (2,647 sq mi). Its administrative center is the urban locality (an urban-type settlement) of Bolshaya Murta. Population: 19,115 (2010 census); 21,087 (2002 Census); 26,102 (1989 Soviet census). The population of Bolshaya Murta accounts for 41.4% of the district's total population.

== Geography ==
The district is located in the forest steppe and subtaiga natural climatic zones.

== History ==
The district was founded on April 4, 1924.

== Government ==
As of 2013, the Head of the District and the Chairman of the District Council is Valery V. Verner.

== Economy ==
=== Transportation ===
The total length of the auto routes in the district is 329.78 kilometers (204.92 mi), of which 324.78 kilometers (201.81 mi) are hard surface roads.
