= Motyginsky District =

Motyginsky District Мотыгинский район (Russian)
- District
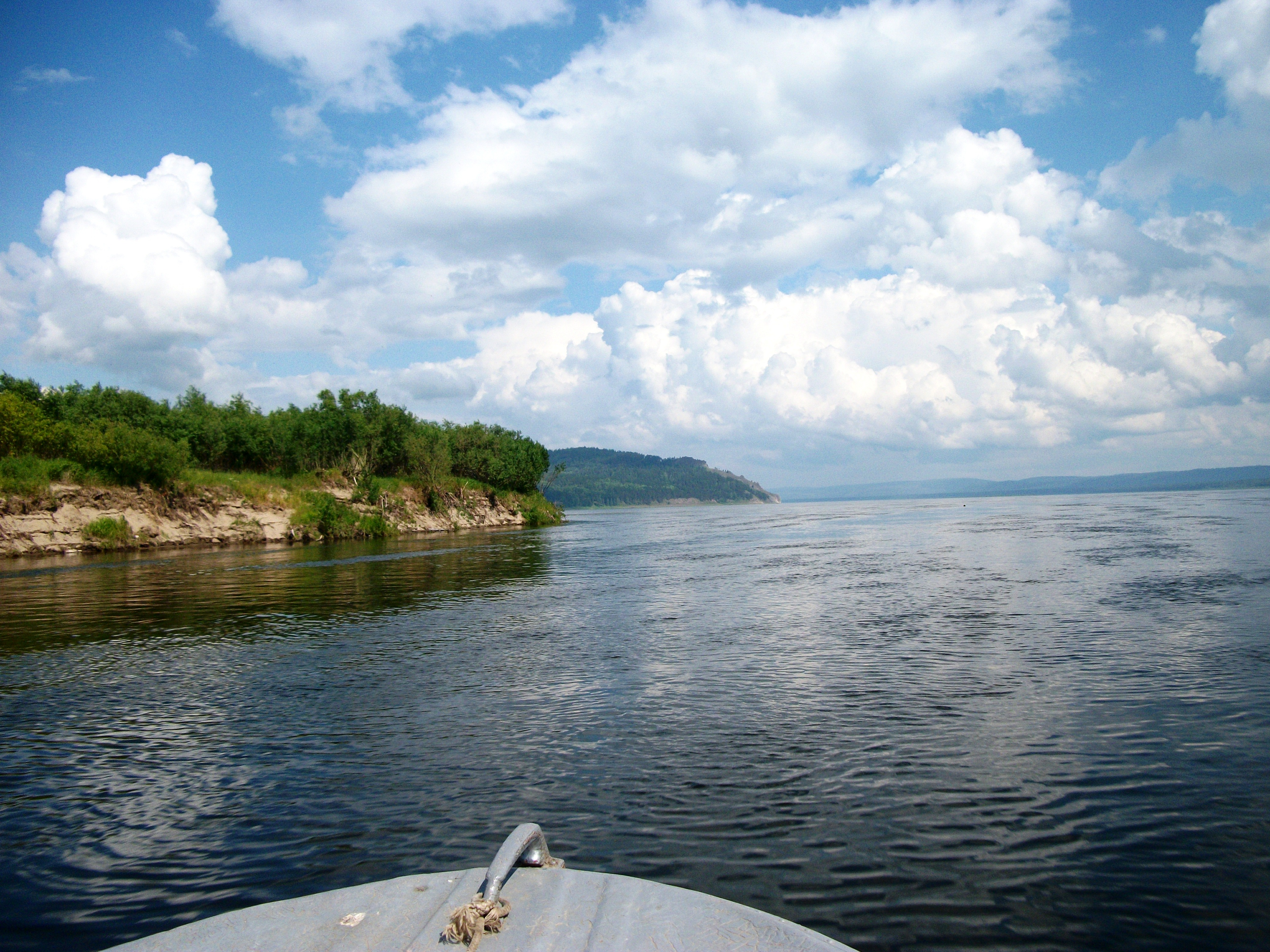
- Angara River, Motyginsky District

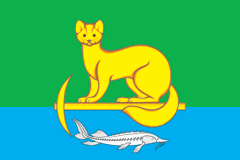
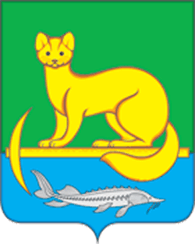
- Flag Coat of arms
- Location of Motyginsky District in Krasnoyarsk Krai
- Coordinates: 58°11′12″N 94°41′14″E
- Country: Russia
- Federal subject: Krasnoyarsk Krai
- Established: July 1, 1931
- Administrative center: Motygino

Government
  - Type: Local government
  - Body: Motyginsky District Council of Deputies
  - Head: Vladimir A. Funk

Area
  - Total: 18,983 km^{2} (7,329 sq mi)

Population (2010 Census)
  - Total: 16,200
  - Density: 0.853/km^{2} (2.21/sq mi)
  - Urban: 55.9%
  - Rural: 44.1%

Administrative structure
  - Administrative divisions: 2 Urban-type settlements, 9 Selsoviets
  - Inhabited localities: 2 urban-type settlements, 19 rural localities

Municipal structure
  - Municipally incorporated as: Motyginsky Municipal District
  - Municipal divisions: 2 urban settlements, 9 rural settlements
- Time zone: UTC+7 (MSK+4)
- OKTMO ID: 04635000
- Website: http://xn----8sbhuagcdpmgcjzkm7m.xn--p1ai/

Motyginsky District (Russian: Моты́гинский райо́н) is an administrative and municipal district (raion), one of the forty-three in Krasnoyarsk Krai, Russia. It is located in the center of the krai and borders with Severo-Yeniseysky District in the north, Evenkiysky District in the northeast, Boguchansky District in the east, Taseyevsky District in the south, Kazachinsky District in the southwest, and with Yeniseysky District in the west. The area of the district is 18,983 square kilometers (7,329 sq mi). Its administrative center is the urban locality (an urban-type settlement) of Motygino. Population: 16,200 (2010 census); 19,140 (2002 Census); 26,595 (1989 Soviet census). The population of Motygino accounts for 36.4% of the district's total population.

== Geography ==
The district is located in the Angara River valley.

== History ==
The district was founded on July 1, 1931.

== Government ==
As of 2013, the Head of the district and the Chairman of the District Council is Vladimir A. Funk.
