= Yeniseysk Airport =

Yeniseysk Airport Аэропорт Енисейск
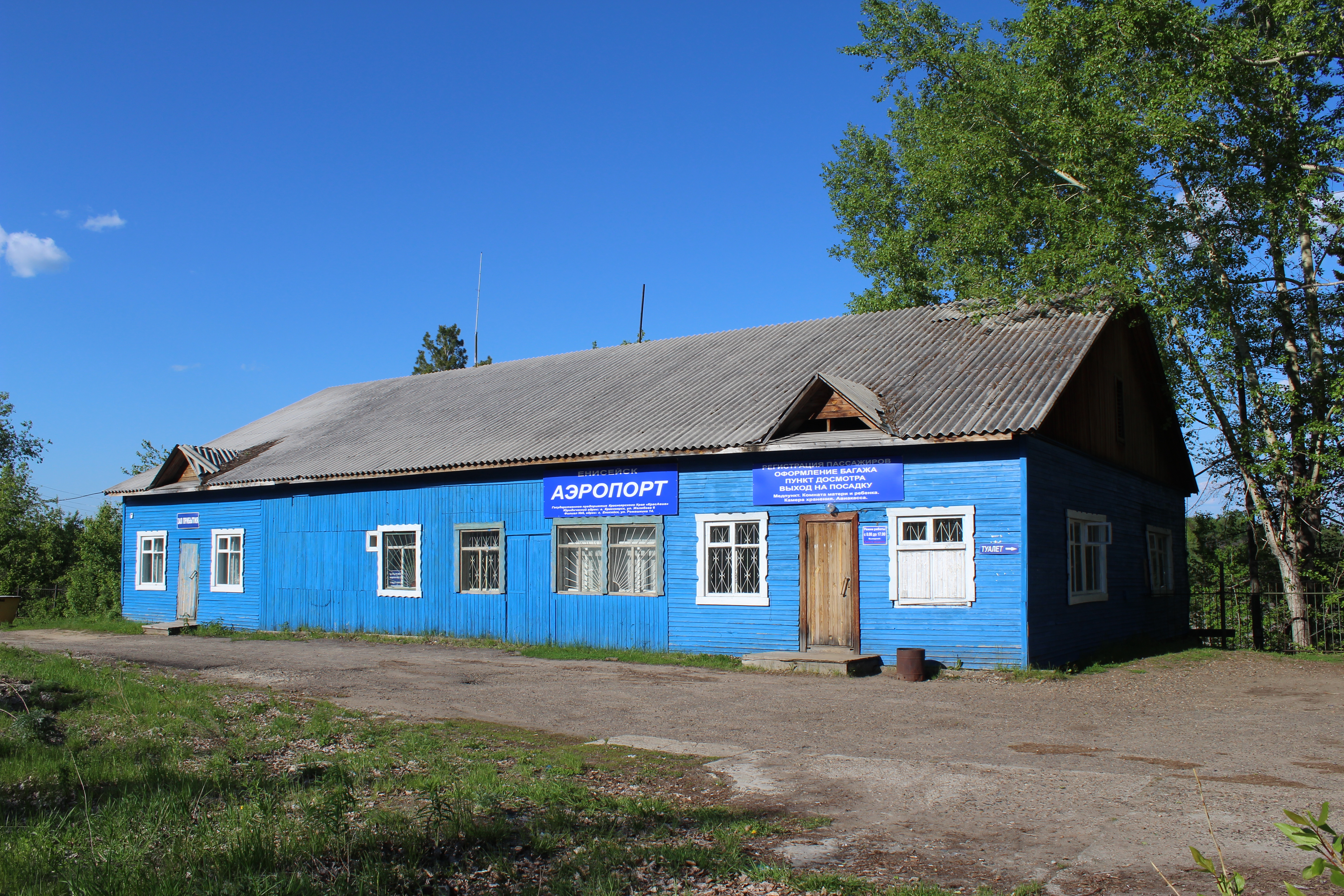
- IATA: EIE; ICAO: UNII

Summary
- Airport type: Public
- Location: Yeniseysk
- Elevation AMSL: 253 ft / 77 m
- Coordinates: 58°28′24″N 92°6′48″E
- Interactive map of Yeniseysk Airport; Аэропорт Енисейск

Runways
Direction	Length		Surface
Direction	ft	m	Surface
16/34	7,185	2,190	Asphalt

Yeniseysk Airport (Russian: Аэропорт Енисейск) (IATA: EIE, ICAO: UNII) is an airport in Russia located 4 kilometres (2.5 mi) northwest of Yeniseysk, close to the left bank of the Yenisey River. Although little used by passengers these days, the airport is highly photogenic for its quaintly decrepit timber terminal building and vast graveyard of small and mid-sized Soviet era planes, slowly rusting around its runways.

== History ==
Yeniseisk Airport dates back to 1934 making it one of the region's oldest, a necessity for supplying settlements in terrain which was essentially impassable for hundreds of kilometers around. In the post-war years, the airport developed rapidly as a transport hub for passengers to outlying settlements as well as forestry workers and geologists, geophysicists and drillers en route to the Angarsk deposits.

In the 1970s there were flights to Krasnoyarsk, Norilsk and a service by Il-18 to Moscow. In recent years, higher un-subsidised air-transport costs combined with the construction of a good asphalt road to Krasnoyarsk (and passable unpaved roads to outlying villages) has seen the collapse of demand for pricey air-shuttles.

== Specifications ==
The airport is considered third class; capable of handling helicopters and smaller aircraft including Antonov An-2 light bi-planes, An-12 turbo-props, 44-seater An-24s, and Yak-40 tri-engined regional jets. The airport has a certified fuel and lubricants laboratory and an aviation-technical base with An-2 planes and Mi-8 helicopters, to provide socially significant transportation to remote settlements of the middle Yenisey region. However, the airport is reportedly in serious need of reconstruction.

== Flight traffic ==
The table below shows the sharply declining passenger numbers using the airport from 2014. As of 2017 the airport had suspended fixed-wing passenger services pending reconstruction and sponsorship.

Annual passenger numbers
Year	Passengers
2014	11,271
2015	8769
2016	6264
2017	0

Current air service is only by helicopter shuttle to Mayskoe (Майское) and to Krivlyak (Кривляк) via Yartsevo (Ярцево) along with fire-fighting, air-ambulance and on-demand services through AeroGeo (АэроГео).

== See also ==
- List of airports in Russia
