= Podtyosovo =

Podtyosovo Подтёсово
- Urban-type settlement
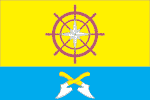
- Flag
- Interactive map of Podtyosovo
- Location of Podtyosovo Podtyosovo (Krasnoyarsk Krai)
- Coordinates: 58.6026°N 92.1038°E
- Country: Russia
- Federal subject: Krasnoyarsk Krai
- Administrative district: Yeniseysky District
- Elevation: 77 m (253 ft)

Population (2010 Census)
  - Total: 4,718
  - Estimate (2025): 3,451 (−26.9%)
- Time zone: UTC+7 (MSK+4)
- Postal code: 663168
- OKTMO ID: 04615155051

Podtyosovo (Russian: Подтёсово) is an urban locality (an urban-type settlement) in Yeniseysky District of Krasnoyarsk Krai, Russia. Population: 4,718 (2010 census); 5,658 (2002 census); 6,555 (1989 Soviet census).
