= Yeniseysky District =

Yeniseysky District Енисейский район (Russian)
- District
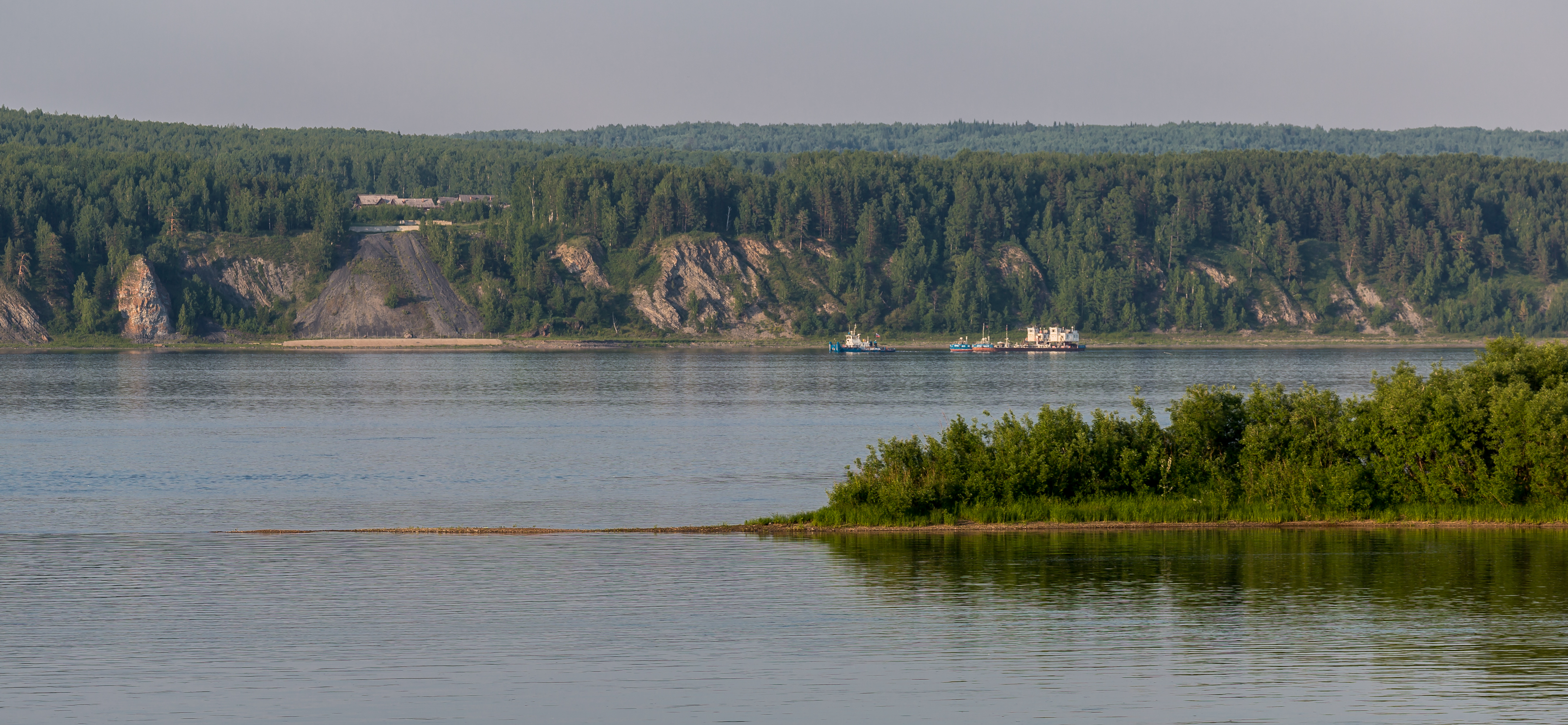
- Angara River in Yeniseysky District

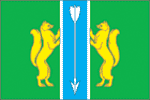
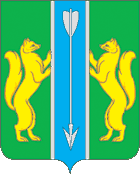
- Flag Coat of arms
- Location of Yeniseysky District in Krasnoyarsk Krai
- Coordinates: 60°N 89°E
- Country: Russia
- Federal subject: Krasnoyarsk Krai
- Established: April 4, 1924
- Administrative center: Yeniseysk

Government
  - Type: Local government
  - Body: Yeniseysky District Council of Deputies
  - Head: Sergey V. Yermakov

Area
  - Total: 106,300 km^{2} (41,000 sq mi)

Population (2010 Census)
  - Total: 27,223
  - Density: 0.2561/km^{2} (0.6633/sq mi)
  - Urban: 17.3%
  - Rural: 82.7%

Administrative structure
  - Administrative divisions: 1 Urban-type settlements, 25 Selsoviets
  - Inhabited localities: 1 urban-type settlements, 64 rural localities

Municipal structure
  - Municipally incorporated as: Yeniseysky Municipal District
  - Municipal divisions: 1 urban settlements, 25 rural settlements
- Time zone: UTC+7 (MSK+4)
- OKTMO ID: 04615000
- Website: http://www.enadm.ru

Yeniseysky District (Russian: Енисе́йский райо́н) is an administrative and municipal district (raion), one of the forty-three in Krasnoyarsk Krai, Russia. It is located in the west of the krai and borders with Turukhansky and Evenkiysky Districts in the north, Severo-Yeniseysky and Motyginsky Districts in the east, Kazachinsky District in the southeast, Pirovsky, Birilyussky, and Tyukhtetsky Districts in the southwest, Tomsk Oblast in the west, and with Khanty–Mansi Autonomous Okrug in the northwest. The area of the district is 106,300 square kilometers (41,000 sq mi). Its administrative center is the town of Yeniseysk (which is not administratively a part of the district). Population: 27,223 (2010 census); 31,315 (2002 Census); 30,477 (1989 Soviet census).

== History ==
The district was founded on April 4, 1924.

== Administrative and municipal status ==
Within the framework of administrative divisions, Yeniseysky District is one of the forty-three in the krai. The town of Yeniseysk serves as its administrative center, despite being incorporated separately as a krai town—an administrative unit with the status equal to that of the districts. The district is divided into one urban-type settlement (Podtyosovo) and twenty-five selsoviets.

As a municipal division, the district is incorporated as Yeniseysky Municipal District and is divided into one urban settlement (corresponding to the administrative district's urban-type settlement of Podtyosovo) and twenty-five rural settlements (corresponding to the administrative district's selsoviets). The krai town of Yeniseysk is incorporated separately from the district as Yeniseysk Urban Okrug.
