= Motygino, Krasnoyarsk Krai =

Motygino Мотыгино
- Urban-type settlement
- Location of Motygino
- Location of Motygino Motygino (Krasnoyarsk Krai)
- Coordinates: 58.1843°N 94.6938°E
- Country: Russia
- Federal subject: Krasnoyarsk Krai
- Administrative district: Motyginsky District
- Founded: 1671

Population (2010 Census)
  - Total: 5,902
- Time zone: UTC+7 (MSK+4)
- Postal code(s): 182270
- OKTMO ID: 04635151051

Motygino (Russian: Моты́гино) is an urban locality (an urban-type settlement) in Motyginsky District of Krasnoyarsk Krai, Russia. Population: 5,902 (2010 Census); 6,730 (2002 Census); 7,985 (1989 Soviet census).
