= Taseyevo =

Rural locality in Taseyevsky District, Russia

Coordinates: 57°12′33″N 94°53′17″E

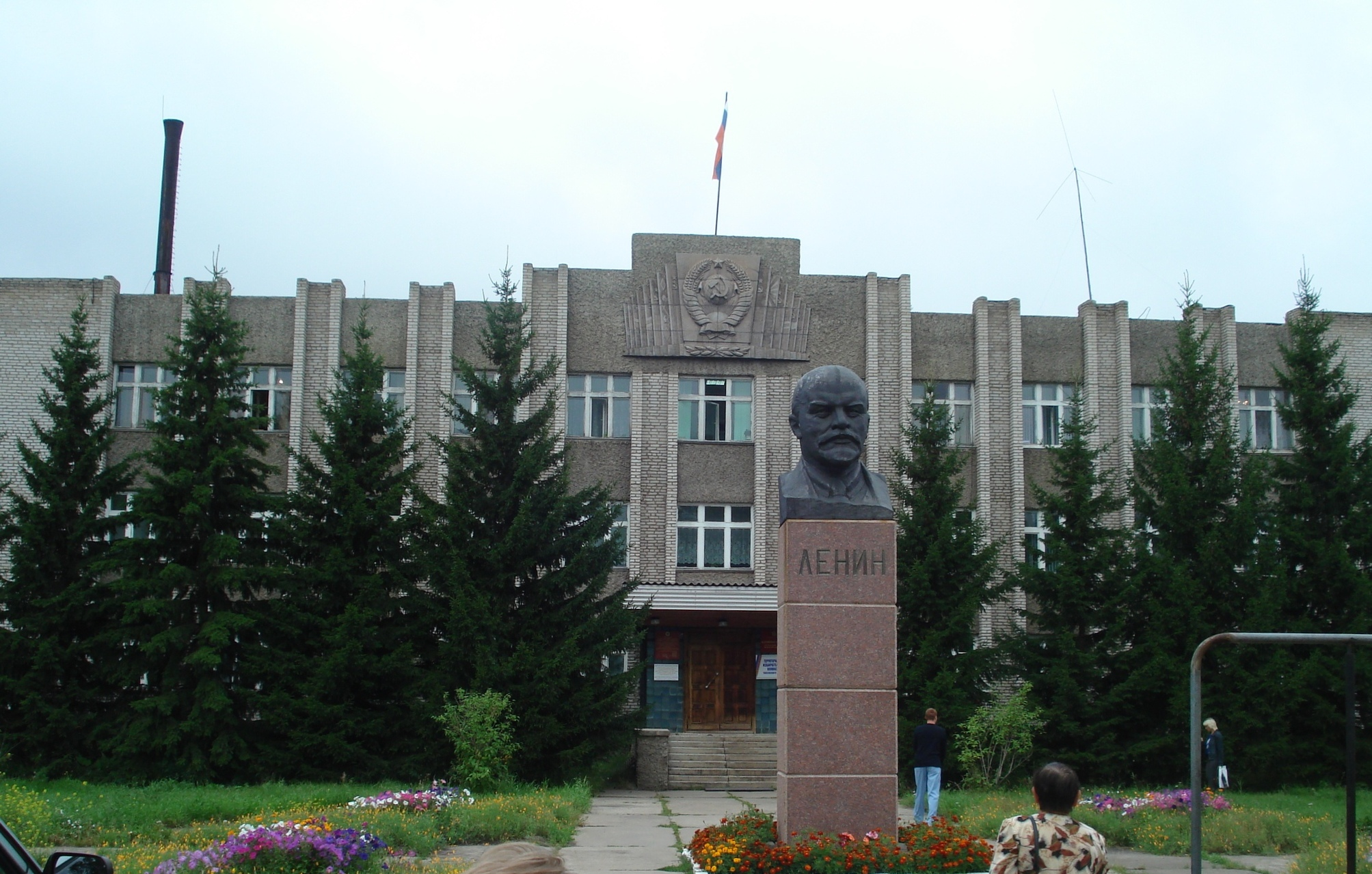
Administration building in Taseyevo

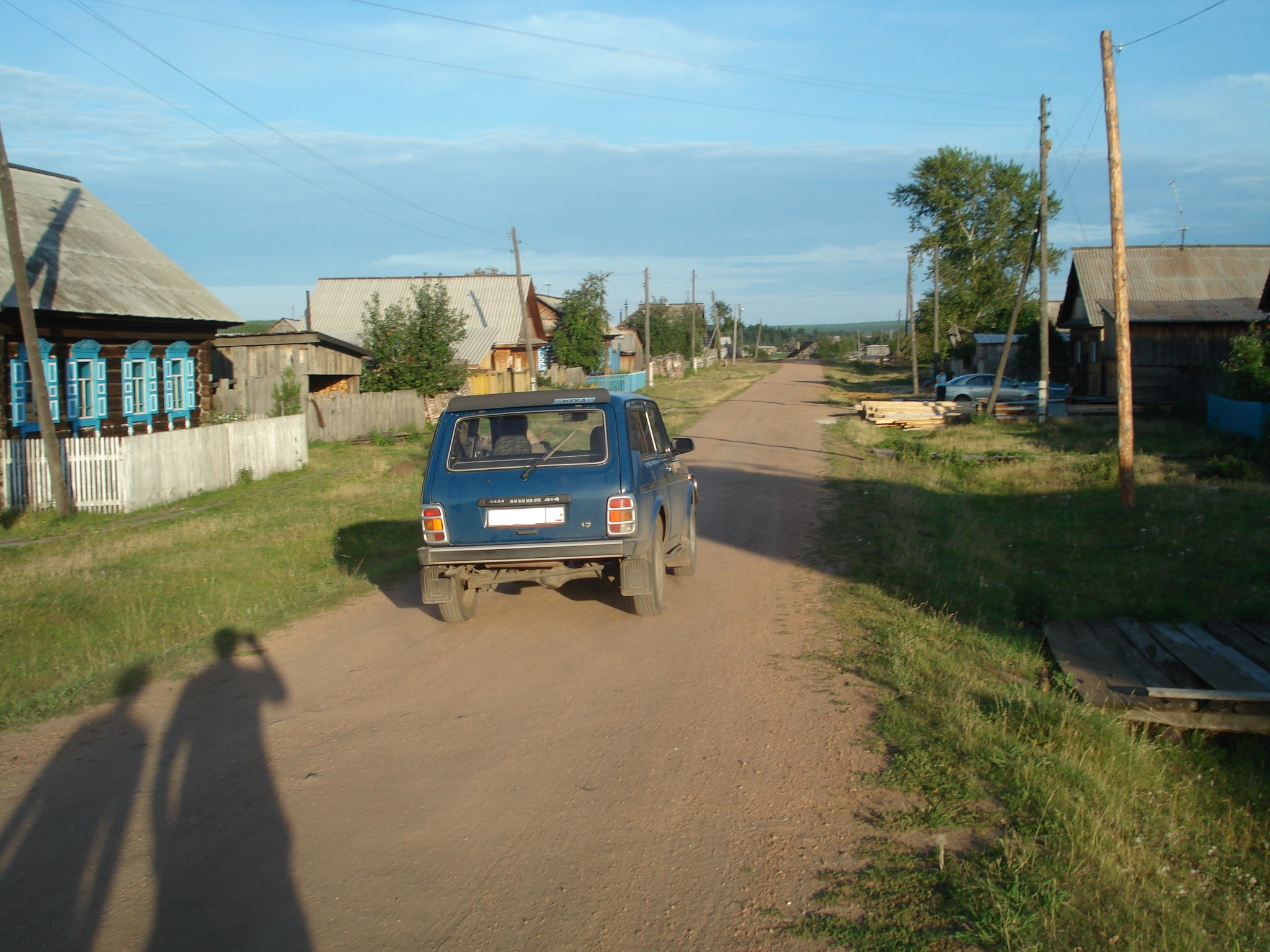
Taseyevo in 2008

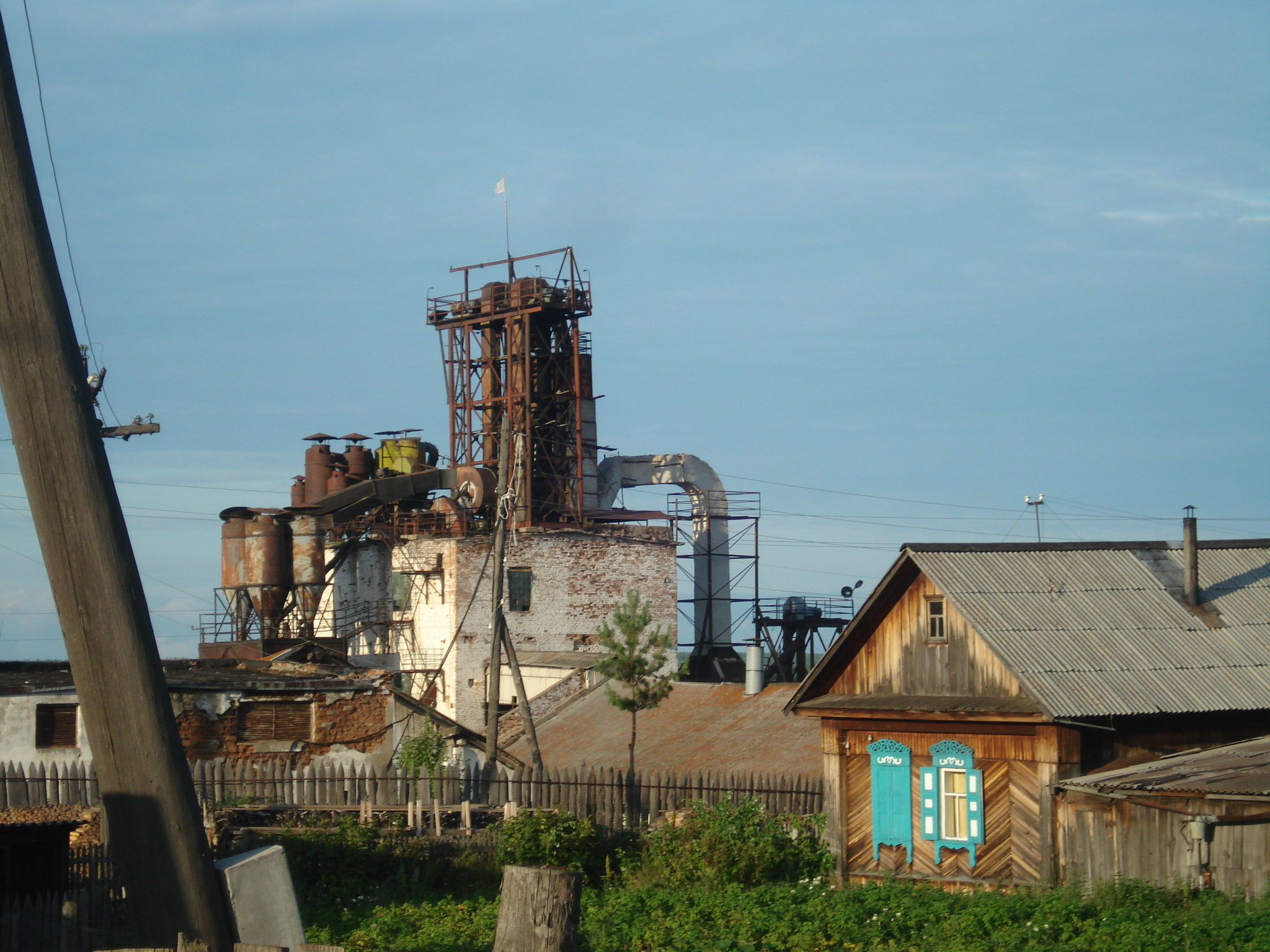
Old factory in Taseyevo

Taseyevo (Russian: Тасе́ево) is a rural locality (a selo) and the administrative center of Taseyevsky District in Krasnoyarsk Krai, Russia. Population: 8,038 (2010 census); 8,613 (2002 census); 10,213 (1989 Soviet census).

Taseyevo still has the communal layout of the Soviet era, with houses closely spaced together and farm land further out. During Soviet times, it used to have factories for soda, bread, and bricks.

Taseyevo is one of the locations where the Soviets deported people starting in the 1930s, including from Latvia and Lithuania, forcing them to stay there for at least twenty years.
