= Kazachinsky District =

Kazachinsky District Казачинский район (Russian)
- District
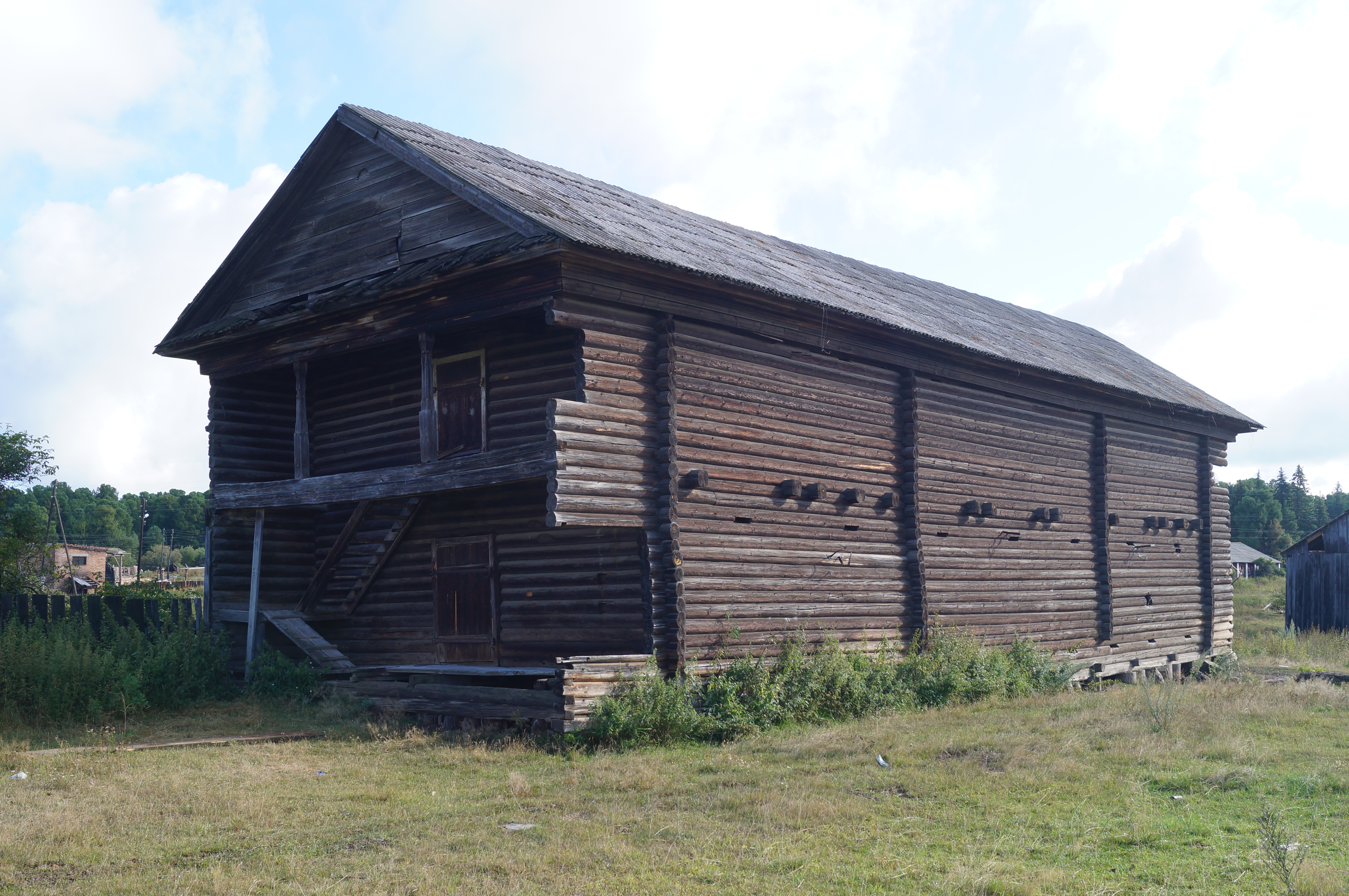
- Historic barn in Kazachinsky District

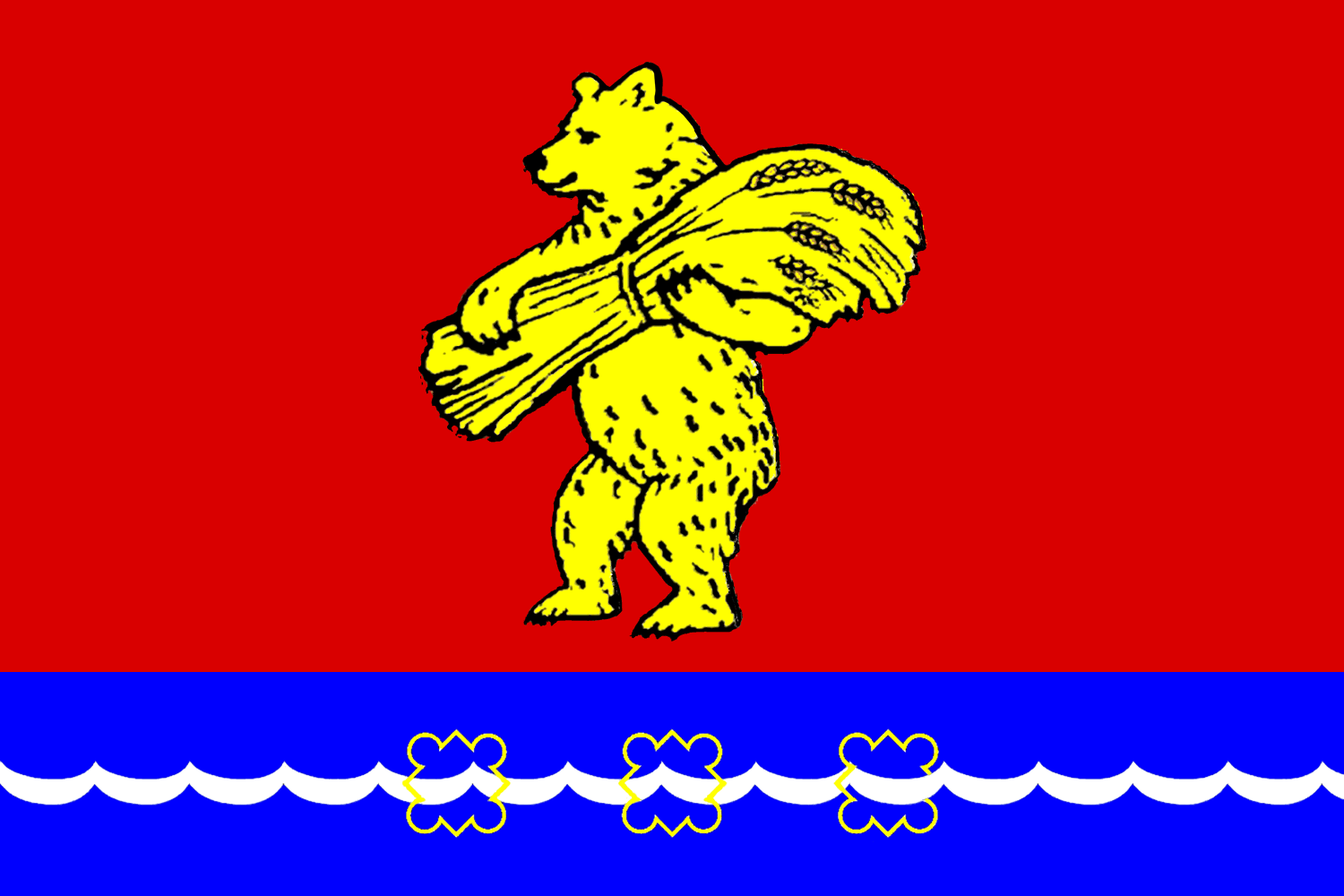
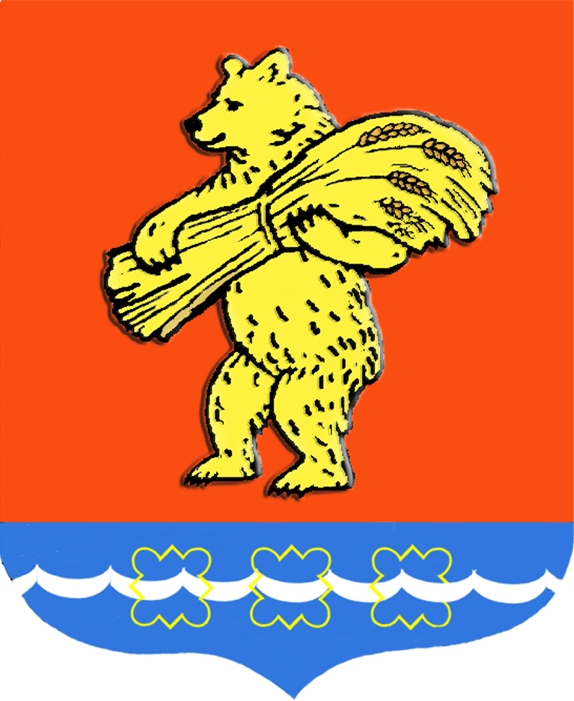
- Flag Coat of arms
- Location of Kazachinsky District in Krasnoyarsk Krai
- Coordinates: 57°42′N 93°16′E
- Country: Russia
- Federal subject: Krasnoyarsk Krai
- Established: April 4, 1924
- Administrative center: Kazachinskoye

Government
  - Type: Local government
  - Body: Kazachinsky District Council of Deputies
  - Head: Yury Ye. Ozerskikh

Area
  - Total: 5,755 km^{2} (2,222 sq mi)

Population (2010 Census)
  - Total: 11,430
  - Density: 1.986/km^{2} (5.144/sq mi)
  - Urban: 0%
  - Rural: 100%

Administrative structure
  - Administrative divisions: 14 Selsoviets
  - Inhabited localities: 37 rural localities

Municipal structure
  - Municipally incorporated as: Kazachinsky Municipal District
  - Municipal divisions: 0 urban settlements, 13 rural settlements
- Time zone: UTC+7 (MSK+4)
- OKTMO ID: 04620000
- Website: http://www.mokazrn.ru

Kazachinsky District (Russian: Каза́чинский райо́н) is an administrative and municipal district (raion), one of the forty-three in Krasnoyarsk Krai, Russia. It is located in the southern central part of the krai and borders with Yeniseysky and Motyginsky Districts in the north, Taseyevsky District in the east, Bolshemurtinsky District in the south, and with Pirovsky District in the west. The area of the district is 5,755 square kilometers (2,222 sq mi). Its administrative center is the rural locality (a selo) of Kazachinskoye. Population: 11,430 (2010 census); 12,732 (2002 census); 16,015 (1989 Soviet census). The population of Kazachinskoye accounts for 33.8% of the district's total population.

== Geography ==
The district is located in the Central part of Krasnoyarsk region, 160-230 km North of Krasnoyarsk And 110-130 km from Yeniseisk. The area is 5755 km².

Situated on both banks of the Yenisey river, through the area the trail passes Р409 "Krasnoyarsk — Yeniseisk". Near the village of kazachinsky (233-240 km from Krasnoyarsk) is one of the most impassable areas on the Yenisei — kazachinsky threshold (rus). Adjacent territory:

- North: Yeniseisky and Motyginsky districts of Krasnoyarsk region;
- East: Taseevsky district of Krasnoyarsk territory;
- South: Bolshemurtinsky district of Krasnoyarsk region;
- West: Pirovsky district of Krasnoyarsk region.

== History ==
The district was founded on April 4, 1924.

== Divisions and government ==
Kazachinsky district Council of deputies Date of formation: 13.09.2015. Term of office: 5 years

Chairman Paskolniy Igor Nikolaevich Head of kazachinsky district Ozerskyh Yury Evgenievich. Date of election: 27.07.2015. Term of office: 5 years
