= Severo-Yeniseysky District =

Severo-Yeniseysky District Северо-Енисейский район (Russian)
- District
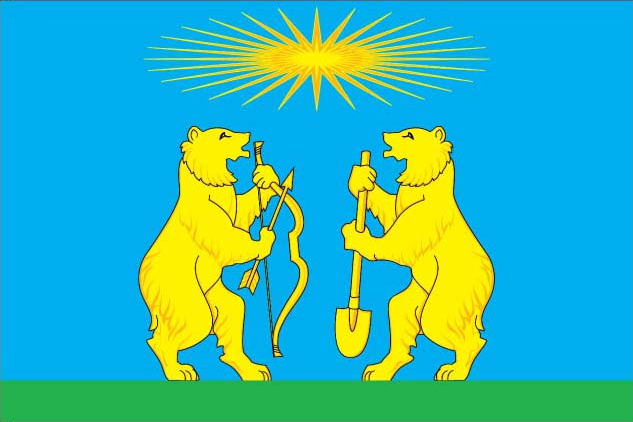
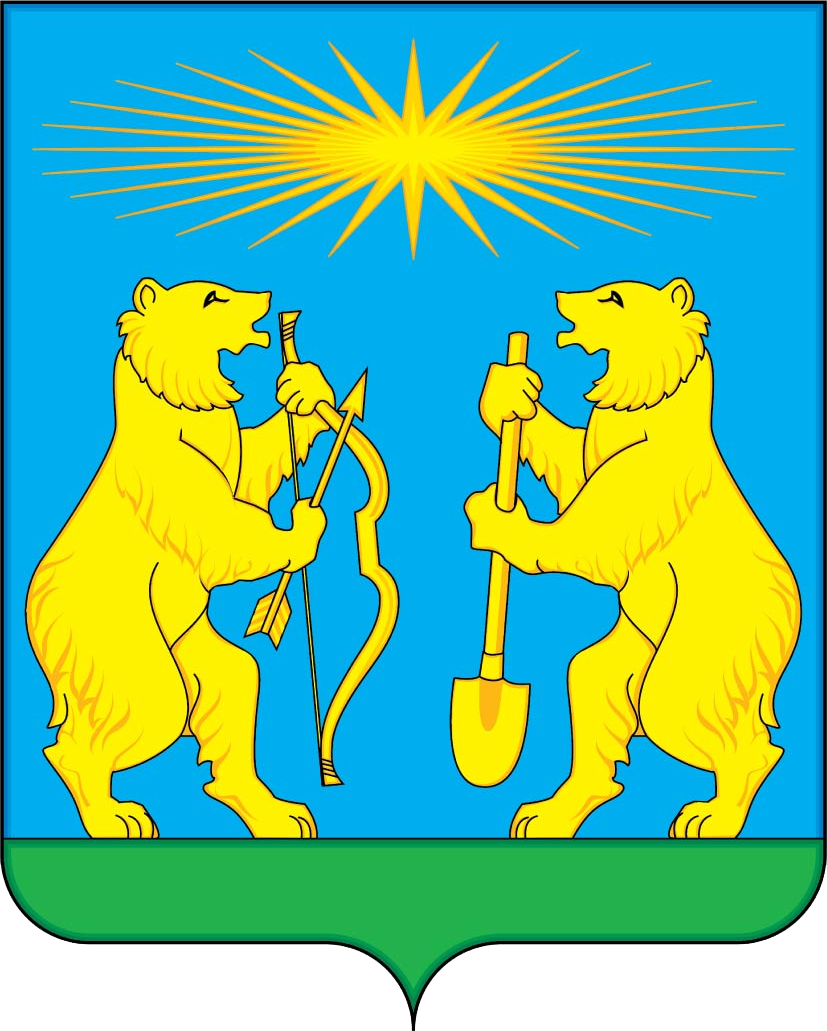
- Flag Coat of arms
- Location of Severo-Yeniseysky District in Krasnoyarsk Krai
- Coordinates: 60°22′49″N 93°02′06″E
- Country: Russia
- Federal subject: Krasnoyarsk Krai
- Established: April 1, 1932
- Administrative center: Severo-Yeniseysky

Government
  - Type: Local government
  - Body: Severo-Yeniseysky District Council of Deputies
  - Head: Ishmurat M. Gaynutdinov

Area
  - Total: 47,242 km^{2} (18,240 sq mi)

Population (2010 Census)
  - Total: 11,119
  - Density: 0.23536/km^{2} (0.60959/sq mi)
  - Urban: 76.3%
  - Rural: 23.7%

Administrative structure
  - Inhabited localities: 1 urban-type settlements, 11 rural localities

Municipal structure
  - Municipally incorporated as: Severo-Yeniseysky Municipal District
  - Municipal divisions: 0 urban settlements, 0 rural settlements
- Time zone: UTC+7 (MSK+4)
- OKTMO ID: 04649000
- Website: http://www.admse.ru/

Severo-Yeniseysky District (Russian: Се́веро-Енисе́йский райо́н) is an administrative and municipal district (raion), one of the forty-three in Krasnoyarsk Krai, Russia. It is located in the center of the krai and borders with Evenkiysky District in the northwest, north, and east, Motyginsky District in the southeast, and with Yeniseysky District in the southwest and west. The area of the district is 47,242 square kilometers (18,240 sq mi). Its administrative center is the urban locality (an urban-type settlement) of Severo-Yeniseysky. Population: 11,119 (2010 census); 11,077 (2002 Census); 17,163 (1989 Soviet census). The population of Severo-Yeniseysky accounts for 62.5% of the district's total population.

Historical population
Year	Pop.	±%
1970	13,678	—
1979	13,144	−3.9%
1989	17,163	+30.6%
2002	11,077	−35.5%
2010	11,119	+0.4%
2021	6,167	−44.5%
Source: Census data

== History ==
The district was founded on April 1, 1932.

== Government ==
As of 2013, the Head of the district and the Chairman of the District Council is Ishmurat M. Gaynutdinov.
