= Pirovsky District =

Pirovsky District Пировский район (Russian)
- District
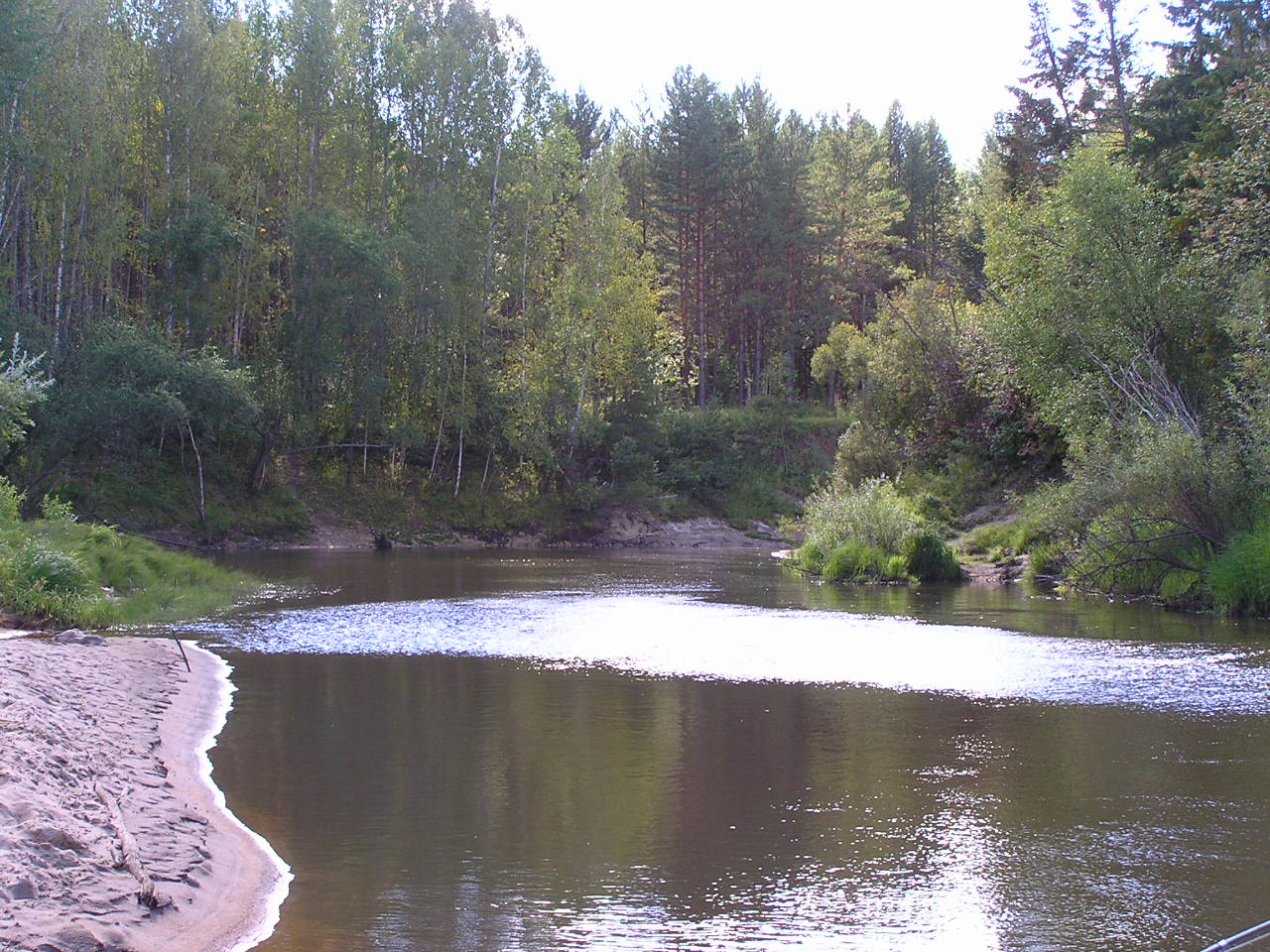
- Ket River

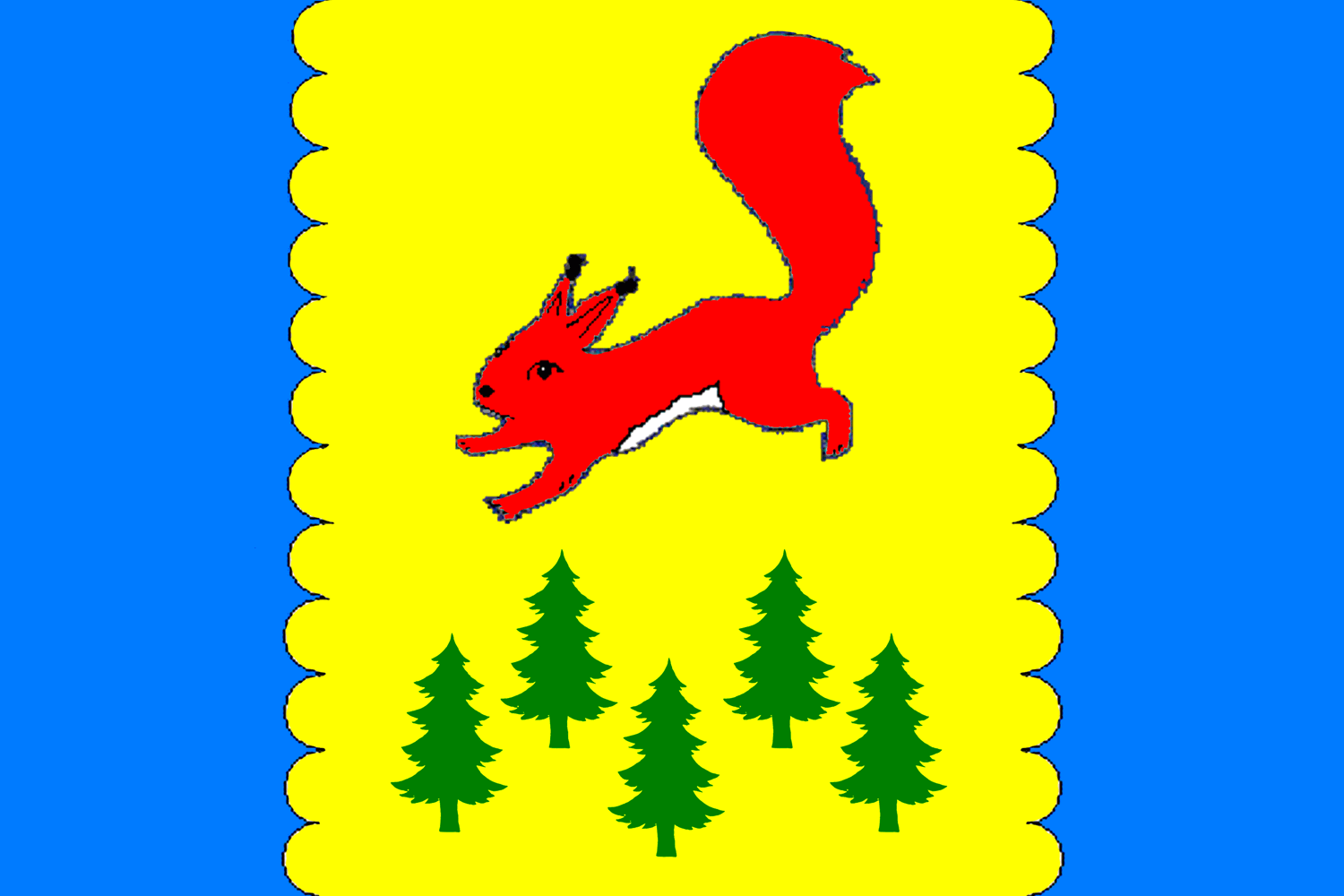
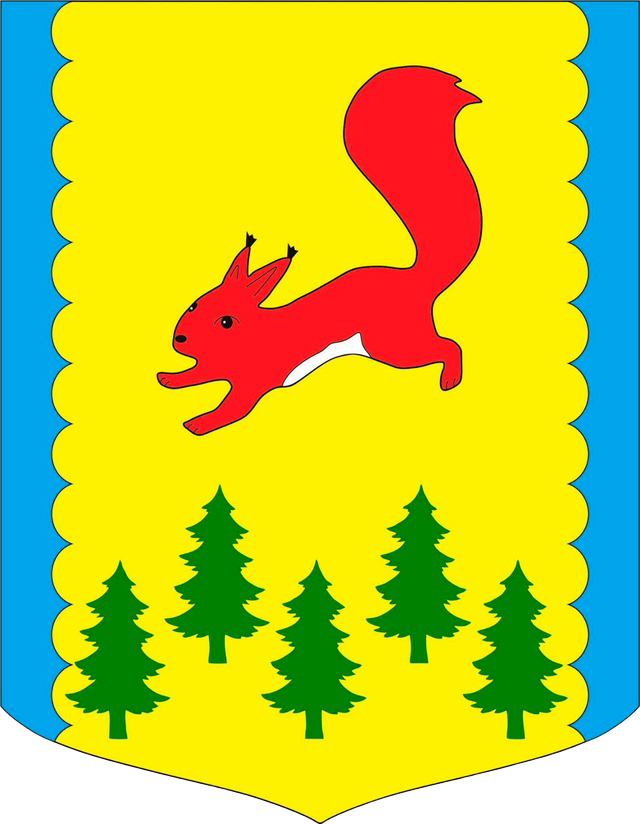
- Flag Coat of arms
- Location of Pirovsky District in Krasnoyarsk Krai
- Coordinates: 57°37′41″N 92°16′05″E
- Country: Russia
- Federal subject: Krasnoyarsk Krai
- Established: April 4, 1924
- Administrative center: Pirovskoye

Government
  - Type: Local government
  - Body: Pirovsky District Council of Deputies
  - Head: Alexander I. Yevseyev

Area
  - Total: 6,241 km^{2} (2,410 sq mi)

Population (2010 Census)
  - Total: 7,572
  - Density: 1.213/km^{2} (3.142/sq mi)
  - Urban: 0%
  - Rural: 100%

Administrative structure
  - Administrative divisions: 10 selsoviet
  - Inhabited localities: 39 rural localities

Municipal structure
  - Municipally incorporated as: Pirovsky Municipal District
  - Municipal divisions: 0 urban settlements, 10 rural settlements
- Time zone: UTC+7 (MSK+4)
- OKTMO ID: 04645000
- Website: http://www.piradm.ru/

Pirovsky District (Russian: Пи́ровский райо́н) is an administrative and municipal district (raion), one of the forty-three in Krasnoyarsk Krai, Russia. It is located in the southwest of the krai and is bordered by Yeniseysky District in the north, Kazachinsky District in the east, Bolshemurtinsky District in the southeast and south, and Birilyussky District in the west. The area of the district is 6,241 square kilometers (2,410 sq mi). Its administrative center is the rural locality (a selo) of Pirovskoye. In 2010, the district's population was 7,572 (2010 census); the population was 9,150 in 2002 (2002 Census) and 11,896 in 1989 (1989 Soviet census). The population of Pirovskoye accounts for 39.7% of the district's total population.

== History ==
The district was founded on April 4, 1924.

== Government ==
As of 2013, the Head of the district and the Chairman of the District Council is Alexander I. Yevseyev.

== Notable people ==
Russian revolutionary Mikhail Petrashevsky is buried within the bounds of Pirovsky District.

== Sources ==
- Законодательное собрание Красноярского края. Закон №10-4765 от 10 июня 2010 г. «О перечне административно-территориальных единиц и территориальных единиц Красноярского края», в ред. Закона №7-3007 от 16 декабря 2014 г. «Об изменении административно-территориального устройства Большеулуйского района и о внесении изменений в Закон края "О перечне административно-территориальных единиц и территориальных единиц Красноярского края"». Вступил в силу 1 июля 2010 г. Опубликован: "Ведомости высших органов государственной власти Красноярского края", №33(404), 5 июля 2010 г. (Legislative Assembly of Krasnoyarsk Krai. Law #10-4765 of June 10, 2010 On the Registry of the Administrative-Territorial Units and the Territorial Units of Krasnoyarsk Krai, as amended by the Law #7-3007 of December 16, 2014 On Changing the Administrative-Territorial Structure of Bolsheuluysky District and on Amending the Krai Law "On the Registry of the Administrative-Territorial Units and the Territorial Units of Krasnoyarsk Krai". Effective as of July 1, 2010.).
- Законодательное собрание Красноярского края. Закон №13-2900 от 25 января 2005 г. «Об установлении границ и наделении соответствующим статусом муниципального образования Пировский район и находящихся в его границах иных муниципальных образований», в ред. Закона №10-4655 от 29 апреля 2010 г. «О внесении изменений в Закон края "Об установлении границ и наделении соответствующим статусом муниципального образования Пировский район и находящихся в его границах иных муниципальных образований"». Вступил в силу через десять дней после официального опубликования. Опубликован: "Ведомости высших органов государственной власти Красноярского края", №5, 7 февраля 2005 г. (Legislative Assembly of Krasnoyarsk Krai. Law #13-2900 of January 25, 2005 On Establishing the Borders and Granting an Appropriate Status to the Municipal Formation of Pirovsky District and to Other Municipal Formations Within Its Borders, as amended by the Law #10-4655 of April 29, 2010 On Amending the Krai Law "On Establishing the Borders and Granting an Appropriate Status to the Municipal Formation of Pirovsky District and to Other Municipal Formations Within Its Borders". Effective as of ten days after the official publication.).
- Пировский районный Совет депутатов. Решение №27-130р от 18 апреля 2007 г. «Устав Пировского района Красноярского края (текст в ред. от 18 апреля 2007 г.)», в ред. Решения №52-339р от 20 июня 2014 г. «О внесении изменений и дополнений в Устав Пировского района Красноярского края». Вступил в силу в день, следующий за днём официального опубликования, осуществляемого при наличии государственной регистрации, за исключением некоторых положений, для которых предусмотрены иные сроки. Опубликован: "Заря", №45–46, 8 июня 2007 г. (Pirovsky District Council of Deputies. Decision #27-130r of April 18, 2007 Charter of Pirovsky District of Krasnoyarsk Krai (text of rev. of April 18, 2007), as amended by the Decision #52-339r of June 20, 2014 On Amending and Supplementing the Charter of Pirovsky District of Krasnoyarsk Krai. Effective as of the day following the official publication, carried out after the state registration; with the exception of several clauses for which different dates of taking effect are specified.).
