= Kazachinskoye, Krasnoyarsk Krai =

Rural locality in Krasnoyarsk Krai, Russia

Coordinates: 57°41′52″N 93°16′53″E

Coat of arms of Kazachinskoye

Kazachinskoye (Russian: Каза́чинское) is a rural locality (a selo) and the administrative center of Kazachinsky District, Krasnoyarsk Krai, Russia. Population: 3,864 (2010 census); 4,050 (2002 census); 4,876 (1989 Soviet census).
