= Pirovskoye =

Rural locality in Krasnoyarsk Krai, Russia

Coordinates: 57°37′03″N 92°17′07″E

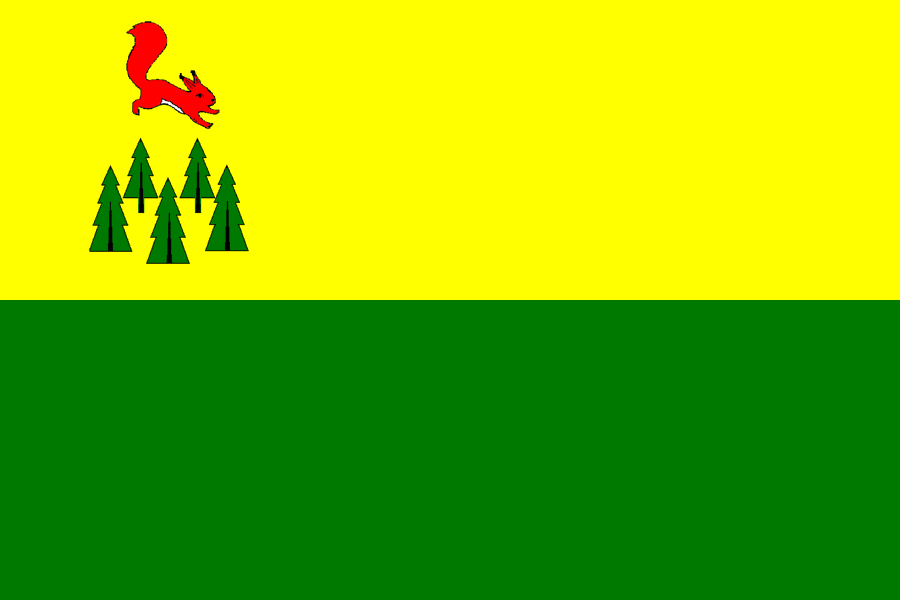
Flag of Pirovskoye

Pirovskoye (Russian: Пи́ровское) is a rural locality (a selo) and the administrative center of Pirovsky District, Krasnoyarsk Krai, Russia. Population: 3,007 (2010 census); 3,292 (2002 census); 4,059 (1989 Soviet census).
