= Severo-Yeniseysky (urban-type settlement) =

Severo-Yeniseysky Северо-Енисейский
- Urban-type settlement
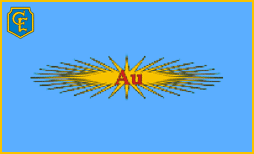
- Flag
- Interactive map of Severo-Yeniseysky
- Location of Severo-Yeniseysky Severo-Yeniseysky (Krasnoyarsk Krai)
- Coordinates: 60.3756°N 93.0350°E
- Country: Russia
- Federal subject: Krasnoyarsk Krai
- Administrative district: Severo-Yeniseysky District

Population (2010 Census)
  - Total: 6,950
  - Estimate (2025): 5,910 (−15%)
- Time zone: UTC+7 (MSK+4)
- Postal code: 663282
- OKTMO ID: 04649000051

Severo-Yeniseysky (Russian: Се́веро-Енисе́йский) is an urban locality (an urban-type settlement) in Severo-Yeniseysky District of Krasnoyarsk Krai, Russia. Population: 6,950 (2010 census); 6,668 (2002 census); 10,143 (1989 Soviet census).

== Climate ==
Severo-Yeniseysky has subarctic climate (Köppen climate classification Dfc) with mild summers and severely cold winters.

Climate data for Severo-Yeniseysky
Month	Jan	Feb	Mar	Apr	May	Jun	Jul	Aug	Sep	Oct	Nov	Dec	Year
Record high °C (°F)	−1.2 (29.8)	3.3 (37.9)	16.6 (61.9)	19.0 (66.2)	30.3 (86.5)	32.8 (91.0)	33.0 (91.4)	31.4 (88.5)	26.0 (78.8)	18.7 (65.7)	4.9 (40.8)	2.5 (36.5)	33.0 (91.4)
Mean daily maximum °C (°F)	−17.7 (0.1)	−13.7 (7.3)	−5.2 (22.6)	2.4 (36.3)	10.3 (50.5)	19.8 (67.6)	22.4 (72.3)	18.1 (64.6)	9.6 (49.3)	−0.1 (31.8)	−11.4 (11.5)	−16.4 (2.5)	1.5 (34.7)
Daily mean °C (°F)	−21.2 (−6.2)	−17.7 (0.1)	−9.8 (14.4)	−2.3 (27.9)	5.3 (41.5)	14.3 (57.7)	17.2 (63.0)	13.3 (55.9)	5.8 (42.4)	−3.0 (26.6)	−14.7 (5.5)	−19.9 (−3.8)	−2.7 (27.1)
Mean daily minimum °C (°F)	−24.6 (−12.3)	−21.6 (−6.9)	−14.5 (5.9)	−7.0 (19.4)	0.3 (32.5)	8.7 (47.7)	11.9 (53.4)	8.6 (47.5)	2.1 (35.8)	−6.0 (21.2)	−18.1 (−0.6)	−23.3 (−9.9)	−7.0 (19.5)
Record low °C (°F)	−49.8 (−57.6)	−46.5 (−51.7)	−40 (−40)	−33.8 (−28.8)	−20.3 (−4.5)	−7.1 (19.2)	0.1 (32.2)	−5.0 (23.0)	−15.3 (4.5)	−30.0 (−22.0)	−44.7 (−48.5)	−50.3 (−58.5)	−50.3 (−58.5)
Average precipitation mm (inches)	34 (1.3)	31 (1.2)	37 (1.5)	44 (1.7)	52 (2.0)	67 (2.6)	73 (2.9)	82 (3.2)	74 (2.9)	73 (2.9)	55 (2.2)	46 (1.8)	668 (26.2)
Source: Pogoda.ru.net

== See also ==
- Severo-Yeniseysk Airport
- Yenisei Range
