= Yeniseysk =

Town in Krasnoyarsk Krai, Russia

Yeniseysk Енисейск
- Town
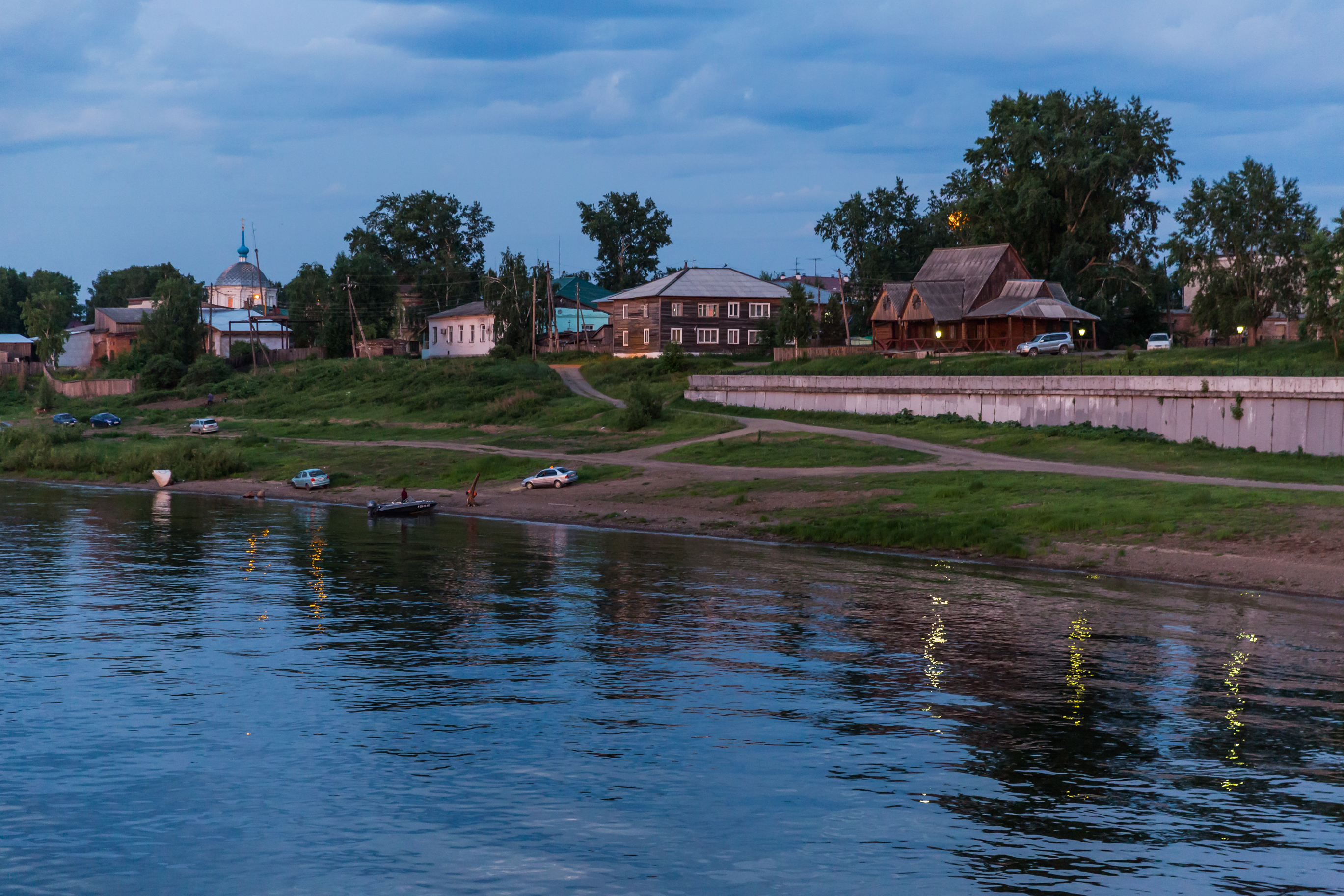
- Yeniseysk

- Flag Coat of arms
- Interactive map of Yeniseysk
- Location of Yeniseysk Yeniseysk (Krasnoyarsk Krai)
- Coordinates: 58°28′N 92°08′E
- Country: Russia
- Federal subject: Krasnoyarsk Krai
- Founded: 1619
- Elevation: 75 m (246 ft)

Population (2010 Census)
  - Total: 18,766
  - Estimate (2021): 17,537 (−6.5%)

Administrative status
  - Subordinated to: krai town of Yeniseysk
  - Capital of: krai town of Yeniseysk, Yeniseysky District

Municipal status
  - Urban okrug: Yeniseysk Urban Okrug
  - Capital of: Yeniseysk Urban Okrug, Yeniseysky Municipal District
- Time zone: UTC+7 (MSK+4)
- Postal code: 663180
- OKTMO ID: 04712000001
- Website: www.eniseysk.com

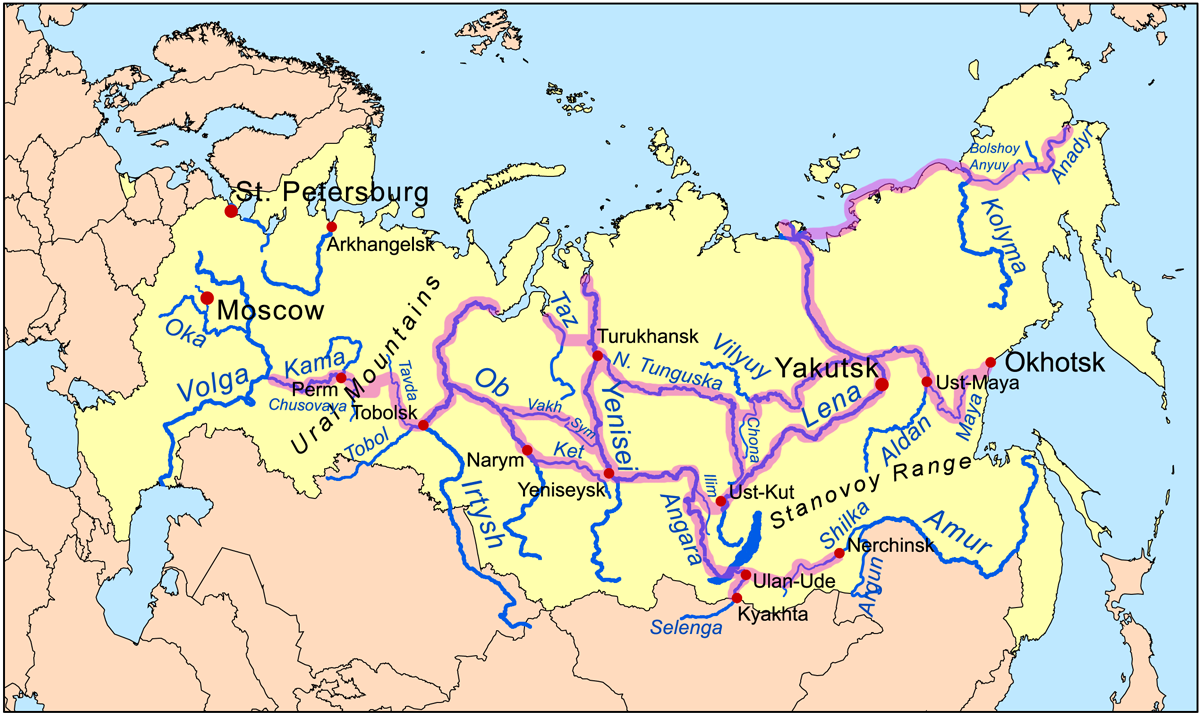
Yeniseysk was an important junction on the Siberian River Routes

Yeniseysk (Russian: Енисейск, IPA: [jɪnʲɪˈsʲejsk]) is a town in Krasnoyarsk Krai, Russia, located on the Yenisei River.

== History ==
Yeniseysk was founded in 1619 as a stockaded town—the first town on the Yenisei River. It played an important role in Russian colonisation of East Siberia in the 17th–18th centuries. Its location is due to the Siberian River Routes from the Urals, up the Ob, up the Ket River, and over a portage to Yeniseysk and from there to the Yenisei basin. It became less important due to road and rail building further south. Its old town is included by the Russian government in the country's tentative World Heritage List.

In 2006 a memorial was erected in the town cemetery to those shot and buried there, especially during the Great Terror.

=== Population ===
- 18,766 (2010 census);
- 20,394 (2002 census);
- 22,891 (1989 Soviet census);
- 20,000 (1970)

== Administrative and municipal status ==
Within the framework of administrative divisions, Yeniseysk serves as the administrative centre of Yeniseysky District, even though it is not a part of it. As an administrative division, it is incorporated separately as the krai town of Yeniseysk—an administrative unit with the status equal to that of the districts. As a municipal division, the krai town of Yeniseysk is incorporated as Yeniseysk Urban Okrug.

== Transportation ==
The town is served by the Yeniseysk Airport.

== Geography ==
=== Climate ===
Yeniseysk has a subarctic climate (Köppen climate classification Dfc), with long, severely cold winters and short, warm summers. Precipitation is moderate, and is somewhat higher in summer than at other times of the year. Being less affected by the dry Siberian High in winter than areas farther east, Yeniseysk has reliably high snowfall by Siberian standards with a total of 207.8 millimetres (8.18 in) of precipitation between October and April, although on average not very high amounts compared to other cold climates close to oceans.

Climate data for Yeniseysk (1991-2020, extremes 1853-present)
Month	Jan	Feb	Mar	Apr	May	Jun	Jul	Aug	Sep	Oct	Nov	Dec	Year
Record high °C (°F)	3.1 (37.6)	7.1 (44.8)	16.5 (61.7)	27.0 (80.6)	33.2 (91.8)	35.4 (95.7)	35.3 (95.5)	33.6 (92.5)	29.2 (84.6)	23.7 (74.7)	12.0 (53.6)	6.1 (43.0)	35.4 (95.7)
Mean daily maximum °C (°F)	−15.8 (3.6)	−10.8 (12.6)	−1.2 (29.8)	7.3 (45.1)	15.6 (60.1)	23.0 (73.4)	25.4 (77.7)	21.6 (70.9)	13.6 (56.5)	4.3 (39.7)	−7.1 (19.2)	−13.7 (7.3)	5.2 (41.3)
Daily mean °C (°F)	−20.2 (−4.4)	−16.5 (2.3)	−7.7 (18.1)	1.4 (34.5)	8.8 (47.8)	16.4 (61.5)	18.9 (66.0)	15.5 (59.9)	8.3 (46.9)	0.5 (32.9)	−10.7 (12.7)	−17.5 (0.5)	−0.2 (31.6)
Mean daily minimum °C (°F)	−24.4 (−11.9)	−21.4 (−6.5)	−13.6 (7.5)	−3.8 (25.2)	3.0 (37.4)	10.0 (50.0)	12.7 (54.9)	10.1 (50.2)	4.1 (39.4)	−2.6 (27.3)	−13.9 (7.0)	−21.3 (−6.3)	−5.1 (22.8)
Record low °C (°F)	−58.8 (−73.8)	−53.3 (−63.9)	−47.1 (−52.8)	−35.6 (−32.1)	−17.1 (1.2)	−3.9 (25.0)	1.2 (34.2)	−3.1 (26.4)	−8.9 (16.0)	−33.6 (−28.5)	−49.0 (−56.2)	−54.5 (−66.1)	−58.8 (−73.8)
Average precipitation mm (inches)	27 (1.1)	20 (0.8)	20 (0.8)	29 (1.1)	44 (1.7)	54 (2.1)	61 (2.4)	58 (2.3)	55 (2.2)	45 (1.8)	43 (1.7)	37 (1.5)	493 (19.5)
Average precipitation days (≥ 0.1 mm)	22.4	19.9	17.7	15.0	15.8	11.9	10.4	13.1	16.6	21.2	24.2	25.0	213.2
Average relative humidity (%)	78.9	77.8	69.8	61.6	59.8	67.5	72.7	76.7	77.9	79.0	80.5	78.8	73.4
Mean monthly sunshine hours	43.4	92.4	159.6	217.5	248.0	295.5	314.7	240.3	132.0	76.0	48.8	31.0	1,899.2
Source 1: Pogoda.ru.net
Source 2: climatebase.ru (precipitation days, humidity and sun 1887-2012)

== Notable people ==
- Semyon Dezhnev (served in Yeniseysk in early 1630s) explorer from the Pyotr Beketov's Cossack detachment.
