= Uyarsky District =

Uyarsky District Уярский район (Russian)
- District
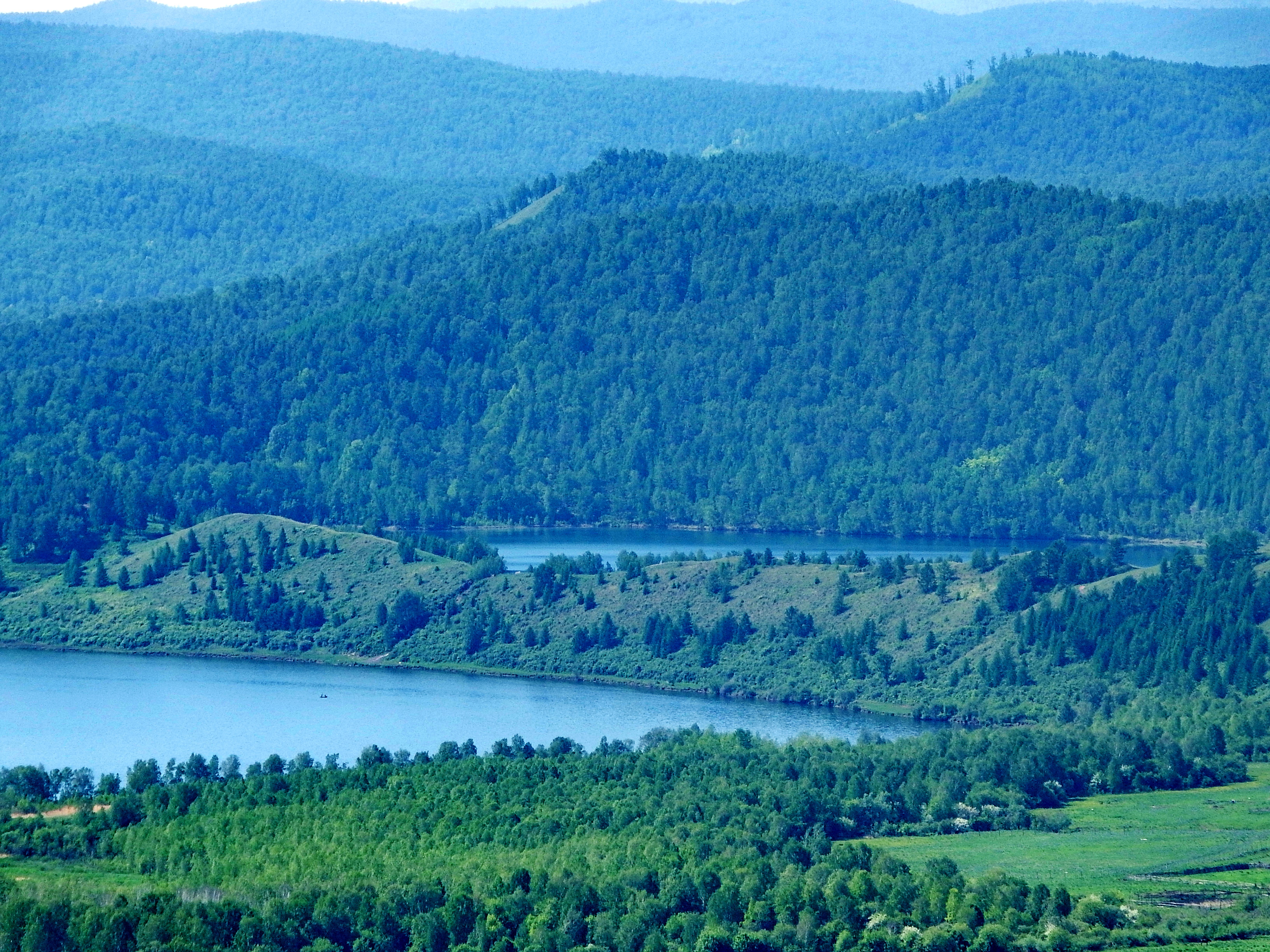
- Round Lake, Uyarsky District

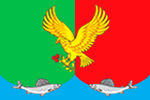
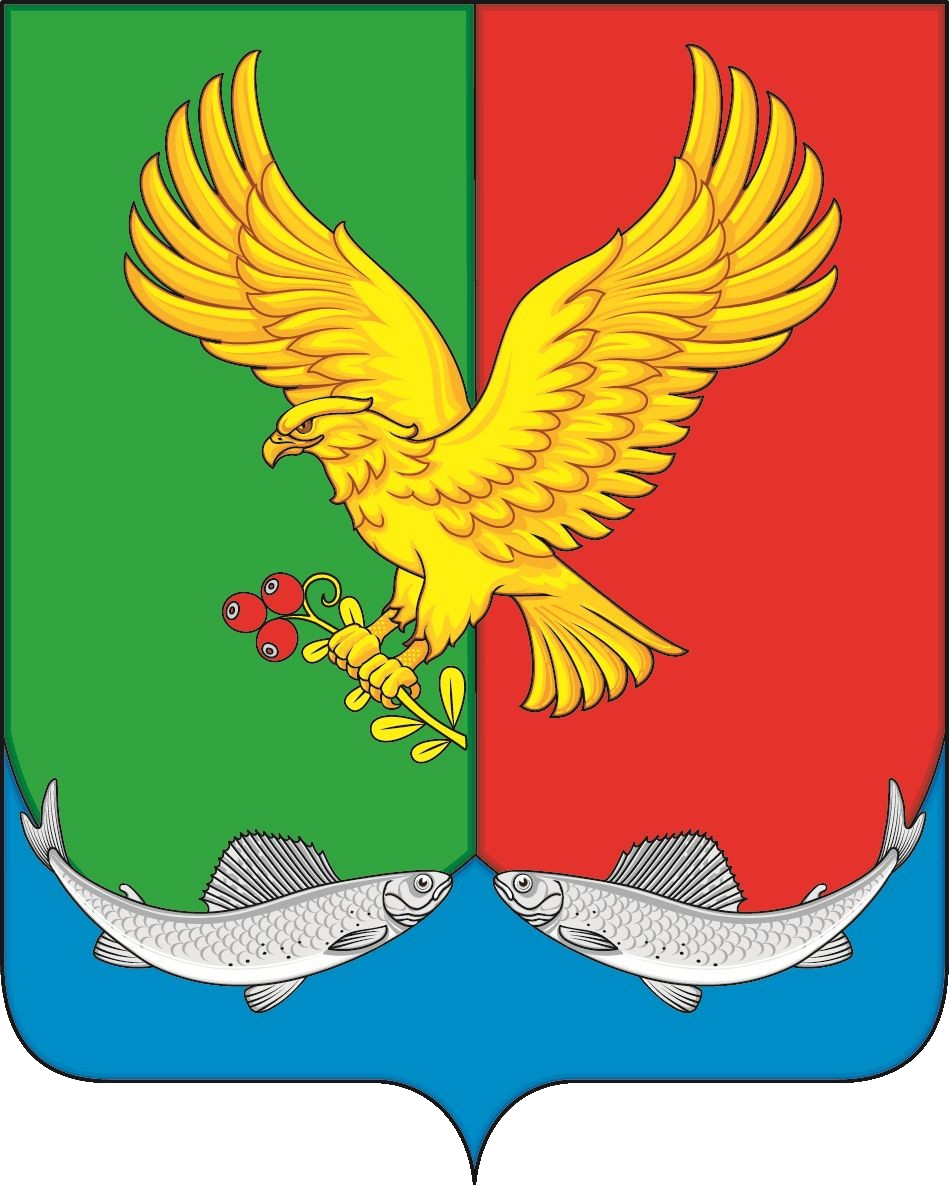
- Flag Coat of arms
- Location of Uyarsky District in Krasnoyarsk Krai
- Coordinates: 55°49′01″N 94°18′58″E
- Country: Russia
- Federal subject: Krasnoyarsk Krai
- Established: 4 April 1924
- Administrative center: Uyar

Government
  - Type: Local government
  - Body: Uyarsky District Council of Deputies
  - Head: Natalya A. Soboleva (acting)

Area
  - Total: 2,196 km^{2} (848 sq mi)

Population (2010 Census)
  - Total: 21,932
  - Density: 9.987/km^{2} (25.87/sq mi)
  - Urban: 57.7%
  - Rural: 42.3%

Administrative structure
  - Administrative divisions: 1 District towns, 9 Selsoviets
  - Inhabited localities: 1 cities/towns, 31 rural localities

Municipal structure
  - Municipally incorporated as: Uyarsky Municipal District
  - Municipal divisions: 1 urban settlements, 9 rural settlements
- Time zone: UTC+7 (MSK+4)
- OKTMO ID: 04657000
- Website: http://admuyarsky.ru/

Uyarsky District (Russian: Уя́рский райо́н) is an administrative and municipal district (raion), one of the forty-three in Krasnoyarsk Krai, Russia. It is located in the south of the krai and borders with Sukhobuzimsky District in the north, Rybinsky District in the east, Partizansky District in the south, Mansky District in the west, and with Beryozovsky District in the northwest. The area of the district is 2,196 square kilometers (848 sq mi). Its administrative center is the town of Uyar. Population: 21,932 (2010 census); 24,559 (2002 Census); 29,241 (1989 Soviet census). The population of Uyar accounts for 57.7% of the district's total population.

== History ==
The district was founded on 4 April 1924.

== Divisions and government ==
As of 2013, the acting Head of the district is Natalya A. Soboleva and the Chairman of the District Council is Vladimir N. Solomatov.
