= Uyar, Uyarsky District, Krasnoyarsk Krai =

Town in Krasnoyarsk Krai, Russia

Uyar Уяр
- Town
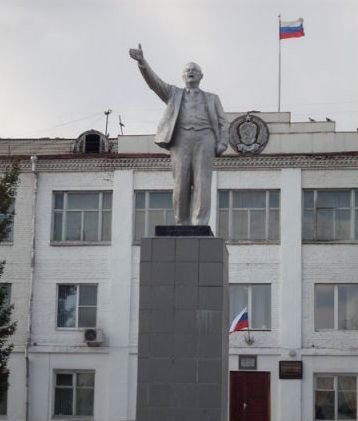
- Monument to Vladimir Lenin in Uyar

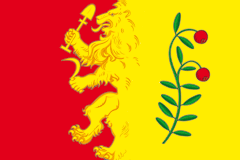
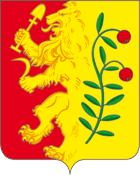
- Flag Coat of arms
- Interactive map of Uyar
- Location of Uyar Uyar (Krasnoyarsk Krai)
- Coordinates: 55°49′36″N 94°18′55″E
- Country: Russia
- Federal subject: Krasnoyarsk Krai
- Administrative district: Uyarsky District
- District townSelsoviet: Uyar
- Known since: 1760
- Town status since: 1944
- Elevation: 340 m (1,120 ft)

Population (2010 Census)
  - Total: 12,665
  - Estimate (2021): 12,036 (−5%)

Administrative status
  - Capital of: Uyarsky District, district town of Uyar

Municipal status
  - Municipal district: Uyarsky Municipal District
  - Urban settlement: Uyar Urban Settlement
  - Capital of: Uyarsky Municipal District, Uyar Urban Settlement
- Time zone: UTC+7 (MSK+4)
- Postal code: 663920
- OKTMO ID: 04657101001
- Website: admuyar.ru

Uyar (Russian: Уяр) is a town and the administrative center of Uyarsky District of Krasnoyarsk Krai, Russia, located on the Uyarka River (Yenisei's basin) 132 kilometers (82 mi) east of Krasnoyarsk. Population: 12,665 (2010 census); 13,807 (2002 census); 17,040 (1989 Soviet census).

== History ==
It has been known to exist since 1760. In the 19th century, the Trans-Siberian Railway was laid right through the settlement and a small railway station, known as Klyukvennaya (Клюквенная), was also built there. It was there that during the Russian Civil War the Polish 5th Rifle Division capitulated to the Bolsheviks in the course of the White Retreat from Siberia. Town status was granted in 1944. The full name of the town, Uyarspasopreobrazhenskoye, is rarely used.

== Administrative and municipal status ==
Within the framework of administrative divisions, Uyar serves as the administrative center of Uyarsky District. As an administrative division, it is incorporated within Uyarsky District as the district town of Uyar. As a municipal division, the district town of Uyar is incorporated within Uyarsky Municipal District as Uyar Urban Settlement.
