= Yeniseysk constituency =

Russian legislative constituency

Yeniseysk single-member constituency
- Constituency of the Russian State Duma

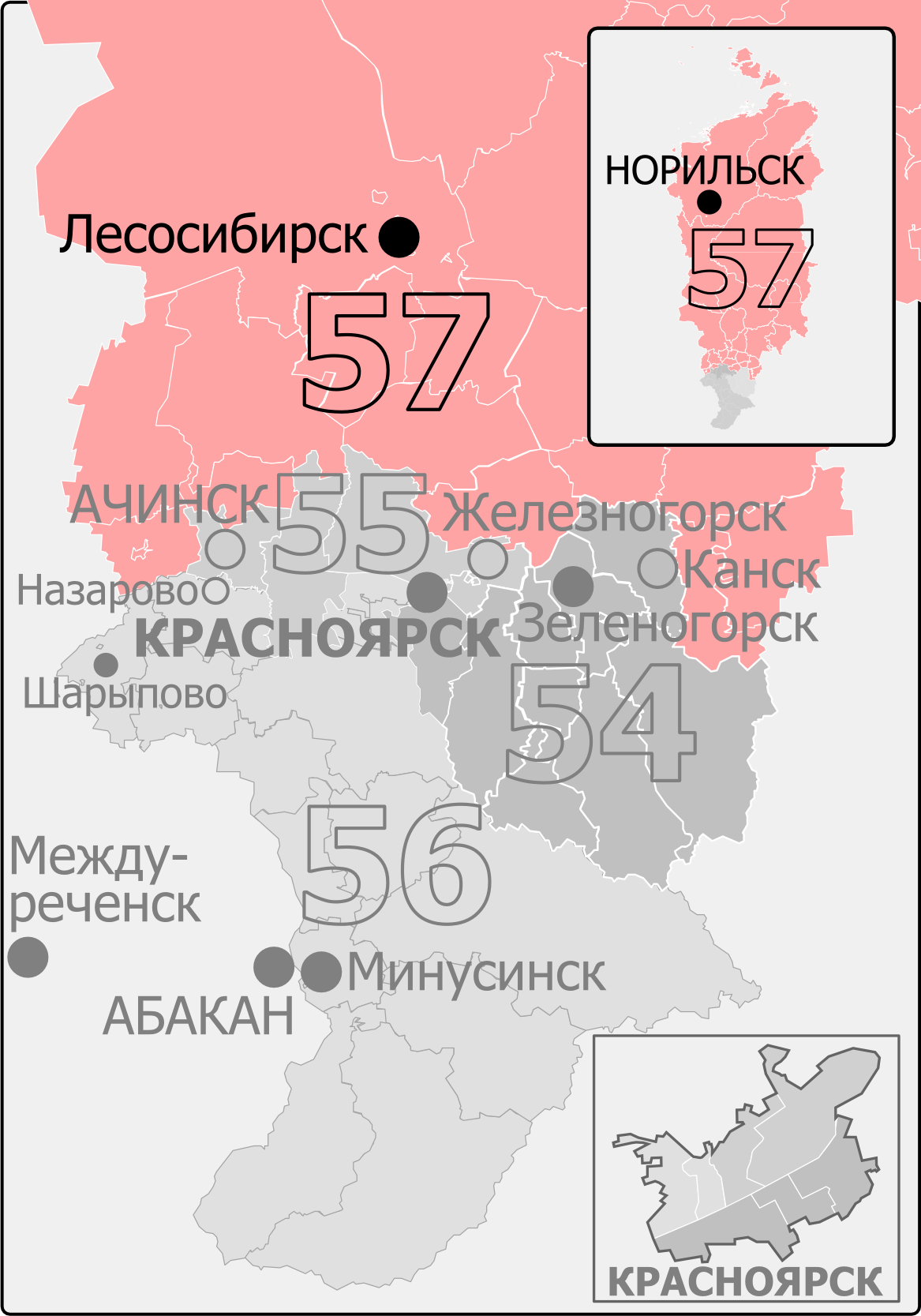
- Constituency boundaries since 2016
- Deputy: Andrey Grachyov; United Russia
- Federal subject: Krasnoyarsk Krai
- Districts: Abansky, Birilyussky, Bogotol, Bogotolsky, Boguchansky, Bolshemurtinsko-Sukhobuzimsky, Bolsheuluysky, Dzerzhinsky, Evenkiysky, Ilansky, Kazachinsky, Kezhemsky, Lesosibirsk, Motyginsky, Nizhneingashsky, Norilsk, Pirovsky, Severo-Yeniseysky, Taseyevsky, Taymyrsky Dolgano-Nenetsky, Turukhansky, Tyukhtetsky, Yeniseysk, Yeniseysky
- Voters: 430,722 (2026)

The Yeniseysk constituency (No.61 (Note: Kansk constituency No.48 in 1993-1995, Kansk constituency No.47 in 1995-2003, Kansk constituency No.49 in 2003-2007, No.57 in 2016–2026)) is a Russian legislative constituency in Krasnoyarsk Krai. The constituency covers mostly northern sparsely populated Krasnoyarsk Krai and the city of Norilsk, which accounts for more than 3/4 territory of the region, making Yeniseysk constituency the second-largest constituency in Russia by area (after Yakutsk constituency).

The constituency has been represented since 2026 by United Russia deputy Andrey Grachyov, former Norilsk Nickel vice president, who won the open seat after two-term United Russia incumbent Aleksey Veller unsuccessfully sought re-election on the party list.

== Boundaries ==
1993–2007 Kansk constituency: Abansky District, Boguchansky District, Borodino, Dzerzhinsky District, Igarka, Ilansky District, Irbeysky District, Kansk, Kansky District, Kazachinsky District, Kezhemsky District, Lesosibirsk, Motyginsky District, Nizhneingashsky District, Partizansky District, Rybinsky District, Sayansky District, Severo-Yeniseysky District, Taseyevsky District, Turukhansky District, Yeniseysk, Yeniseysky District, Zaozyorny, Zelenogorsk
The constituency covered the entirety of vast northern and eastern Krasnoyarsk Krai, including the towns of Borodino, Igarka, Kansk, Lesosibirsk, Yeniseysk and Zaozyorny.

2016–present: Abansky District, Birilyussky District, Bogotol, Bogotolsky District, Boguchansky District, Bolshemurtinsko-Sukhobuzimsky District, Bolsheuluysky District, Dzerzhinsky District, Evenkiysky District, Ilansky District, Kazachinsky District, Kezhemsky District, Lesosibirsk, Motyginsky District, Nizhneingashsky District, Norilsk, Pirovsky District, Severo-Yeniseysky District, Taseyevsky District, Taymyrsky Dolgano-Nenetsky District, Turukhansky District, Tyukhtetsky District, Yeniseysk, Yeniseysky District
The constituency was re-created for the 2016 election, it retained northern Krasnoyarsk Krai and gained small parts of Krasnoyarsk and Achinsk constituencies in the south, Norilsk from Yeniseysky constituency and the entirety of Taymyr and Evenk constituencies of the dissolved Taymyr Autonomous Okrug and Evenk Autonomous Okrug, which merged with Krasnoyarsk Krai in 2007. This seat lost its southern portion in eastern Krasnoyarsk Krai, including Borodino and Kansk to Krasnoyarsk constituency.

== Members elected ==
| Election | Member | Party |
|---|---|---|
| 1993 | Anatoly Yaroshenko | Agrarian Party |
| 1995 | Anatoly Yaroshenko | Agrarian Party |
| 1999 | Pyotr Romanov | Communist Party |
| 2003 | Igor Isakov | United Russia |
| 2007 | Proportional representation - no election by constituency | |
| 2011 | Proportional representation - no election by constituency | |
| 2016 | Raisa Karmazina | United Russia |
| 2021 | Aleksey Veller | United Russia |
| 2026 | Andrey Grachyov | United Russia |

== Election results ==
=== 1993 ===
==== Declared candidates ====
- Sergey Peshkov (Independent), Krasnoyarsk State University Centre for Social Studies director
- Anatoly Popov (Choice of Russia), First Deputy Mayor of Norilsk
- Vladimir Tishin (PRES), former Member of Krasnoyarsk Krai Council of People's Deputies (1990–1993)
- Anatoly Yaroshenko (APR), former People's Deputy of Russia (1990–1993), sovkhoz director

==== Results ====
Summary of the 12 December 1993 Russian legislative election in the Kansk constituency
| Candidate | Party | Votes | % |
|---|---|---|---|
| Anatoly Yaroshenko | Agrarian Party | 96,468 | 32.45% |
| Sergey Peshkov | Independent | 94,076 | 31.65% |
| Vladimir Tishin | Party of Russian Unity and Accord | 18,648 | 6.27% |
| Anatoly Popov | Choice of Russia | 18,514 | 6.23% |
| against all | | 46,742 | 15.72% |
| Total | | 297,276 | 100% |

=== 1995 ===
==== Declared candidates ====
- Yury Ivanov (NDR), Head of Dzerzhinsky District (1989–present)
- Aleksandr Lambin (BIR), cooperative chairman
- Yury Luchkin (Independent)
- Feliks Pashennykh (KRO), Member of State Duma (1994–present)
- Sergey Peshkov (Independent), Krasnoyarsk State University Centre for Social Studies director, 1993 candidate for this seat
- Anatoly Yaroshenko (APR), incumbent Member of State Duma (1994–present)

==== Results ====
Summary of the 17 December 1995 Russian legislative election in the Kansk constituency
| Candidate | Party | Votes | % |
|---|---|---|---|
| Anatoly Yaroshenko (incumbent) | Agrarian Party | 112,372 | 31.58% |
| Sergey Peshkov | Independent | 61,347 | 17.24% |
| Yury Ivanov | Our Home – Russia | 57,775 | 16.24% |
| Feliks Pashennykh | Congress of Russian Communities | 31,036 | 8.72% |
| Aleksandr Lambin | Ivan Rybkin Bloc | 16,232 | 4.56% |
| Yury Luchkin | Independent | 13,880 | 3.90% |
| against all | | 56,277 | 15.82% |
| Total | | 355,818 | 100% |

=== 1999 ===
==== Declared candidates ====
- Igor Isakov (Independent), Achinsk Aluminium Refinery director general
- Vladimir Leopa (Independent), Chief of the Krasnoyarsk Railway Ilansky Division (1984–1989, 1990–present)
- Nikolay Plotnikov (LDPR), Kansk Distillery board of directors chairman
- Pyotr Romanov (CPRF), Member of State Duma (1996–present), 1993 and 1998 gubernatorial candidate
- Anatoly Yaroshenko (Independent), incumbent Member of State Duma (1994–present)

==== Withdrawn candidates ====
- Sergey Kelm (ROS)
- Yury Moskvich (SPS), Deputy Minister for Federation Affairs and Nationalities of Russia (1999–present), former People's Deputy of Russia (1990–1993), 1993 gubernatorial candidate

==== Results ====
Summary of the 19 December 1999 Russian legislative election in the Kansk constituency
| Candidate | Party | Votes | % |
|---|---|---|---|
| Pyotr Romanov | Communist Party | 113,497 | 37.39% |
| Igor Isakov | Independent | 58,980 | 19.43% |
| Nikolay Plotnikov | Liberal Democratic Party | 39,209 | 12.92% |
| Vladimir Leopa | Independent | 31,260 | 10.30% |
| Anatoly Yaroshenko (incumbent) | Independent | 14,419 | 4.75% |
| against all | | 39,780 | 13.11% |
| Total | | 303,516 | 100% |

=== 2003 ===
Results by district: Igor Isakov: 30–40% 40–50%; Pyotr Romanov: 30–40%; Sergey Tsukanov: 40–50%

==== Declared candidates ====
- Igor Isakov (United Russia), Member of Legislative Assembly of Krasnoyarsk Krai (2001–present), 1999 candidate for this seat
- Sergey Kaspirovich (LDPR), volunteer firefighter
- Vasily Kovalev (ORP Rus'), pensioner
- Aleksandr Mnogogreshnov (Independent), Member of Legislative Assembly of Krasnoyarsk Krai (2002–present), road construction businessman
- Sergey Natarov (PVR-RPZh), Member of Legislative Assembly of Krasnoyarsk Krai (2001–present)
- Pyotr Romanov (CPRF), Deputy Chairman of the State Duma (2000–present), incumbent Member of State Duma (1996–present)
- Anatoly Shevchenko (Independent), logistics businessman
- Sergey Tsukanov (APR), Member of Kansky District Council of Deputies, former Member of Krasnoyarsk Krai Council of People's Deputies (1990–1993), breeding plant director

==== Did not file ====
- Aleksey Fedoreyev (Independent), loader
- Aleksandr Kuznetsov (DPR), Kansk municipal worker
- Anatoly Mutovin (KPR), Ministry for Atomic Energy of Russia regional information centre director
- Lyudmila Yatsuk (Independent), middle school counsellor

==== Results ====
Summary of the 7 December 2003 Russian legislative election in the Kansk constituency
| Candidate | Party | Votes | % |
|---|---|---|---|
| Igor Isakov | United Russia | 73,431 | 30.78% |
| Pyotr Romanov (incumbent) | Communist Party | 66,280 | 27.79% |
| Aleksandr Mnogogreshnov | Independent | 29,158 | 12.22% |
| Sergey Tsukanov | Agrarian Party | 19,795 | 8.30% |
| Sergey Kaspirovich | Liberal Democratic Party | 10,325 | 4.33% |
| Anatoly Shevchenko | Independent | 3,034 | 1.27% |
| Vasily Kovalev | United Russian Party Rus' | 2,516 | 1.05% |
| Sergey Natarov | Party of Russia's Rebirth-Russian Party of Life | 2,034 | 0.85% |
| against all | | 27,851 | 11.68% |
| Total | | 238,667 | 100% |

=== 2016 ===
==== Declared candidates ====
- Aleksandr Dyakov (Rodina), Member of Legislative Assembly of Krasnoyarsk Krai (2011–present), gas station chain owner
- Artyom Kardanets (The Greens), lawyer
- Raisa Karmazina (United Russia), Member of State Duma (2003–present)
- Olga Lanovaya (GP), opera singer
- Aleksandr Lympio (A Just Russia), aide to Legislative Assembly of Krasnoyarsk Krai member Nikolay Trikman
- Sergey Natarov (LDPR), former Deputy Minister of Economy and Regional Development of Krasnoyarsk Krai (2013–2015), former Member of Legislative Assembly of Krasnoyarsk Krai (2001–2011), 2003 PVR-RPZh candidate for this seat
- Pyotr Polezhayev (CPRF), first secretary of the Norilsk party committee
- Tatyana Rykunova (Patriots of Russia), Member of Krasnoyarsk City Council of Deputies (2013–present), lawyer
- Andrey Seleznyov (CPCR), former Member of Krasnoyarsk City Council of Deputies (2008–2013), perennial candidate

==== Declined ====
- Yury Strashnikov (United Russia), Member of Legislative Assembly of Krasnoyarsk Krai (2011–present), retired FSB major general (lost the primary)
- Dmitry Trunenkov (United Russia), 2008 and 2013 FIBT World Championship bobsleigh silver medalist (lost the primary)

==== Results ====
Summary of the 18 September 2016 Russian legislative election in the Yeniseysk constituency
| Candidate | Party | Votes | % |
|---|---|---|---|
| Raisa Karmazina | United Russia | 91,725 | 48.41% |
| Sergey Natarov | Liberal Democratic Party | 25,410 | 13.41% |
| Pyotr Polezhayev | Communist Party | 20,534 | 10.84% |
| Aleksandr Dyakov | Rodina | 10,341 | 5.46% |
| Andrey Seleznyov | Communists of Russia | 9,215 | 4.86% |
| Aleksandr Lympio | A Just Russia | 7,583 | 4.00% |
| Olga Lanovaya | Civic Platform | 4,890 | 2.58% |
| Tatyana Rykunova | Patriots of Russia | 4,863 | 2.57% |
| Artyom Kardanets | The Greens | 4,324 | 2.28% |
| Total | | 189,488 | 100% |

=== 2021 ===
==== Declared candidates ====
- Dmitry Dubrov (SR–ZP), Member of Norilsk City Council of Deputies (2012–present), rector of Norilsk State Industrial Institute (2016–present)
- Irina Ivanova (The Greens), Member of Krasnoyarsk City Council of Deputies (2008–2013, 2018–present), television executive
- Vitaly Makarov (CPRF), Member of Nizhneingashsky District Council of Deputies (2020–present), party secretary
- Mikhail Orda (RPPSS), Member of Sukhobuzimsky District Council of Deputies (2020–present), construction businessman
- Olga Rychkova (New People), business coach
- Igor Shmarlovsky (CPCR), trading executive
- Aleksandr Stogniy (LDPR), First Deputy Chairman of the Taymyrsky Dolgano-Nenetsky District Council of Deputies (2018–present), Member of the Council of Deputies (2013–present)
- Aleksey Veller (United Russia), Member of State Duma (2016–present)

==== Declined ====
- Raisa Karmazina (United Russia), incumbent Member of State Duma (2003–present) (ran on the party list)

==== Results ====
Summary of the 17-19 September 2021 Russian legislative election in the Yeniseysk constituency
| Candidate | Party | Votes | % |
|---|---|---|---|
| Aleksey Veller | United Russia | 72,311 | 36.86% |
| Vitaly Makarov | Communist Party | 30,552 | 15.57% |
| Dmitry Dubrov | A Just Russia — For Truth | 18,708 | 9.54% |
| Aleksandr Stogniy | Liberal Democratic Party | 15,798 | 8.06% |
| Irina Ivanova | The Greens | 15,345 | 7.82% |
| Olga Rychkova | New People | 13,554 | 6.91% |
| Mikhail Orda | Party of Pensioners | 9,554 | 4.87% |
| Igor Shmarlovsky | Communists of Russia | 9,461 | 4.82% |
| Total | | 196,162 | 100% |

=== 2026 ===
==== Declared candidates ====
- Nikolay Bukharev (RPPSS), Member of Yeniseysky District Council of Deputies (2025–present), forestry businessman
- Dmitry Dubrov (A Just Russia), Member of Norilsk City Council of Deputies (2012–present), former rector of Polar State University (2016–2022), 2021 candidate for this seat
- Pavel Goponenko (The Greens), businessman
- Vyacheslav Gordeyev (Rodina), former Member of Krasnoyarsk City Council of Deputies (2013–2018), law firm director
- Andrey Grachyov (United Russia), former vice president of Norilsk Nickel (2020–2025)
- Vladislav Konovalov (New People), Member of Zheleznogorsk City Council of Deputies (2025–present), Mining and Chemical Combine worker
- Yelena Rodikova (CPRF), Member of Legislative Assembly of Krasnoyarsk Krai (2025–present)
- Pavel Semizorov (LDPR), Member of Legislative Assembly of Krasnoyarsk Krai (2011–2021, 2025–present)
- Irina Shulzhenko (CPCR), unemployed

==== Declined ====
- Aleksey Veller (United Russia), incumbent Member of State Duma (2016–present) (ran on the party list, lost the primary)

==== Results ====
Summary of the 18-20 September 2026 Russian legislative election in the Yeniseysk constituency
| Candidate | Party | Votes | % |
|---|---|---|---|
| Andrey Grachyov | United Russia | 101,805 | 44.37% |
| Yelena Rodikova | Communist Party | 26,992 | 11.77% |
| Pavel Semizorov | Liberal Democratic Party | 22,218 | 9.68% |
| Nikolay Bukharev | Party of Pensioners | 17,691 | 7.71% |
| Vladislav Konovalov | New People | 15,859 | 6.91% |
| Dmitry Dubrov | A Just Russia | 11,299 | 4.92% |
| Irina Shulzhenko | Communists of Russia | 8,848 | 3.86% |
| Vyacheslav Gordeyev | Rodina | 8,186 | 3.57% |
| Pavel Goponenko | The Greens | 5,555 | 2.42% |
| Total | | 229,423 | 100% |
