= Aban (disambiguation) =

Aban is the Avestan language term for "the waters", used in Zoroastrian doctrine.

Aban may also refer to:

== Places ==
- Aban, Russia, a rural locality (a settlement) in Krasnoyarsk Krai, Russia
- Aban (river), in Krasnoyarsk Krai, Russia
- Aban (crater), on Mars, named after Aban, Russia
- Aban (Iran), an ancient settlement in Kerman Province, Iran

== Other uses ==
- Aban (month), eighth month of the Solar Hijri calendar
- Aba (people), an ethnic group of Siberia
- Aban (name), notable people with the surname or given name
- Aban number, a number written in English without the letter A
- Aban Air, call sign ABAN; see Airline codes-A
