= Ilansky =

Ilansky (masculine), Ilanskaya (feminine), or Ilanskoye (neuter) may refer to:

- Ilansky District, a district of Krasnoyarsk Krai, Russia
- Ilansky Urban Settlement, a municipal formation which the district town of Ilansky in Krasnoyarsk Krai, Russia is incorporated as
- Ilansky (town), a town in Krasnoyarsk Krai, Russia
- Ilanskaya, former name of the town of Ilansky in Krasnoyarsk Krai, Russia
