= Alexey Veller =

Russian politician

- Алексей Веллер
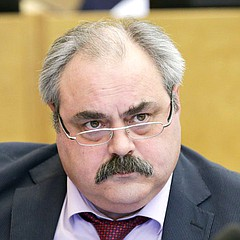

Member of the State Duma for Krasnoyarsk Krai
- Incumbent
- Assumed office 12 October 2021
- Preceded by: Raisa Karmazina
- Constituency: Yeniseysk (No. 56)

Member of the State Duma for Murmansk Oblast
- In office 5 October 2016 – 12 October 2021
- Preceded by: constituency re-established
- Succeeded by: Tatiana Kusayko
- Constituency: Murmansk (No. 128)

6th Mayor of Murmansk
- In office 30 November 2010 – 5 October 2016
- Preceded by: Stepan Tananykin
- Succeeded by: Tamara Pryamikova (acting)

Personal details
- Born: 9 January 1966 (age 60) Murmansk, Russian SFSR, USSR
- Party: United Russia
- Education: Moscow State University of Civil Engineering

Alexey Borisovich Veller (Russian: Алексей Борисович Веллер; born 9 January 1966, Murmansk) is a Russian political figure, former mayor of Murmansk, and a deputy of the 7th and 8th State Dumas.

In 1991, Veller started working at the construction company Agrostroymontazh which he also co-founded. In February 1993, he started working as a technical director. From 2000 to 2010, he was the Chairman of the ASM company that is one of the largest multi-profile investment and construction holding in the Murmansk Oblast. In 2004, he became deputy of the Assembly of Deputies of Murmansk of the 3rd, 4th, and 5th convocations. In 2009 he was elected chairman of the City Council of Deputies. From 2010 to 2016, he was the mayor of Murmansk. In 2016, he was elected deputy of the 7th State Duma. Since September 2021, he has served as deputy of the 8th State Duma.

Over the recent years, Veller was involved in several controversial episodes. For instance, in 2018, it was revealed that his early income constituted 5,2 mln rubles, while his wife earned ten times more and her income constituted 52 mln rubles, compared to 238 thousand rubles that she made a year before. Veller stands for toughening punishment for repeated violation of traffic rules by the drivers. However, in January 2022, his son Mikhail was caught driving drunk.
