= Tatiana Sakharova =

Russian politician (1973–2025)

- Татьяна Сахарова
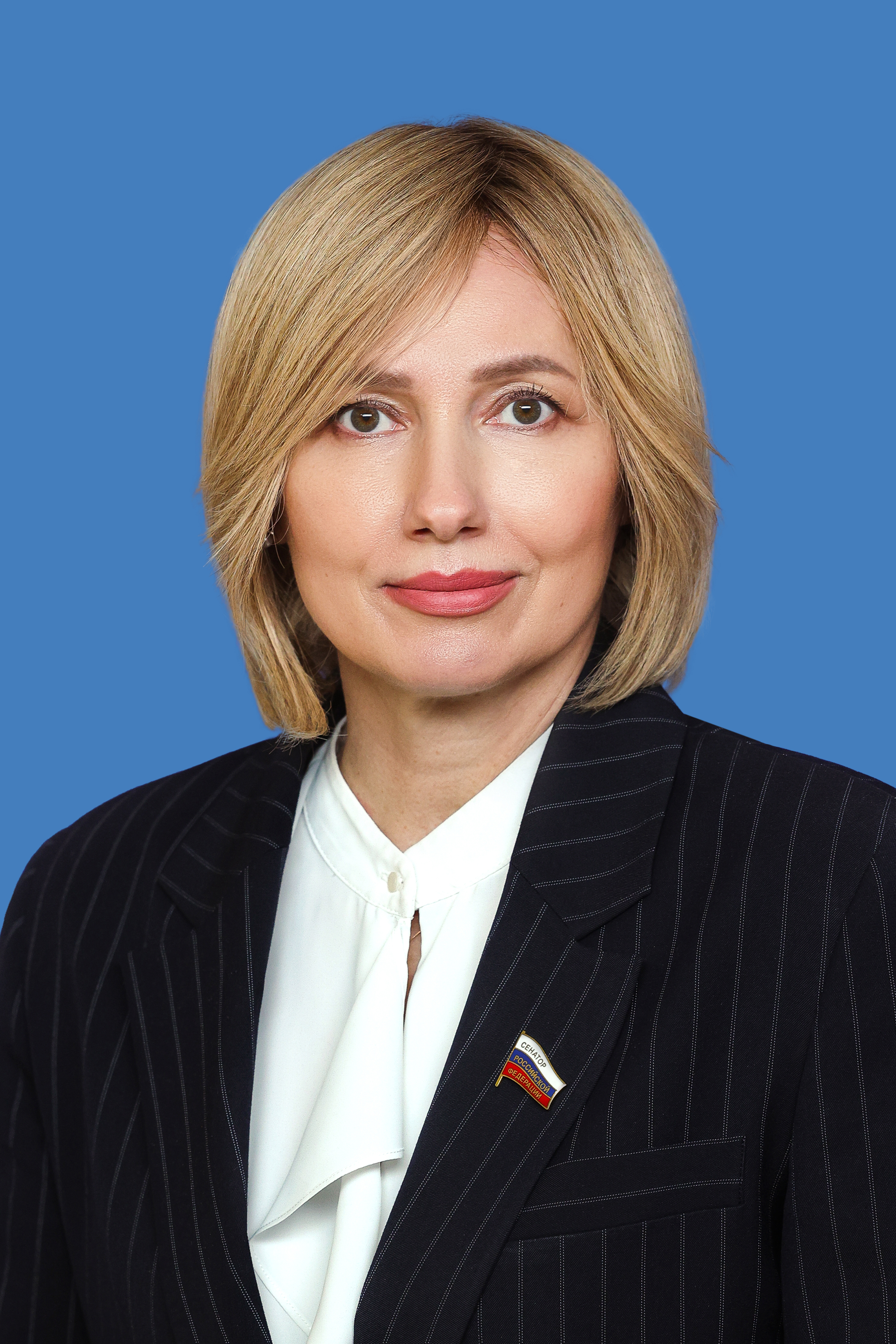
- Sakharova in 2021

Senator from Murmansk Oblast
- In office 7 October 2021 – 4 June 2025
- Preceded by: Tatiana Kusayko
- Succeeded by: Vacant

Personal details
- Born: Tatiana Mirnaya; 16 June 1973; Donetsk, Ukrainian SSR, USSR
- Died: 4 June 2025 (aged 51)
- Political party: United Russia

Tatiana Anatolyevna Sakharova (Russian: Татьяна Анатольевна Сахарова; 16 June 1973 – 4 June 2025) was a Russian politician serving as a senator from Murmansk Oblast from 7 October 2021 until her death on 4 June 2025.

== Life and career ==
Tatiana Sakharova was born on 16 June 1973 in Donetsk. In 1995, she graduated from the Saint Petersburg State University of Economics. From 1996 to 2012, she worked as Head of the Legal Entities Service Sector at the Murmansk branch of Sberbank. From 2015 to 2021, she was the Deputy Chairman of the Council of Deputies in Severomorsk. In December 2019, Sakharova was appointed Head of the regional branch of the United Russia party. On 7 October 2021, she became the senator from the Murmansk Oblast Duma.

Tatiana Sakharova was under personal sanctions introduced by the European Union, the United Kingdom, the United States, Canada, Switzerland, Australia, Ukraine, New Zealand, for ratifying the decisions of the "Treaty of Friendship, Cooperation and Mutual Assistance between the Russian Federation and the Donetsk People's Republic and between the Russian Federation and the Luhansk People's Republic" and providing political and economic support for Russia's annexation of Ukrainian territories.

Sakharova died following a long illness on 4 June 2025, at the age of 51.
