= Stepan Tananykin =

Russian politician of Murmansk (born 1963)

- Степан Тананыкин

5th Mayor of Murmansk
- In office 6 August 2010 – 30 November 2010
- Preceded by: Sergey Subbotin
- Succeeded by: Alexey Veller

Personal details
- Born: Stepan Alexandrovich Tananykin; 12 November 1963 (age 62) Murmansk, Soviet Union
- Party: United Russia

Stepan Alexandrovich Tananykin (Russian: Степан Александрович Тананыкин; born on 12 November 1963), is a Russian politician who had served as the head of the municipality of Murmansk and chairman of the Murmansk City Council (from 6 August to 30 November 2010. He is also a member of the Murmansk City Council since March 2009. He was elected the head of Murmansk from among the deputies of the City Council of Murmansk after the removal by the City Council of Sergey Subbotin in June 2010.

== Biography ==
Stepan Tananykin was born in Murmansk on 12 November 1963.

He served in the military in Afghanistan.

He began his career in 1986, since 1988 he worked on Kolguev Island as a rigger.

From 1995 to 2007, he worked in various positions at CJSC Business Service, including 10 years as Deputy General Director.

Since 2007, he has been working at ORKO-invest LLC as a director.

In 2008, he graduated from the Murmansk Academy of Economics and Management with a degree in Economics and Management at an Enterprise of General Commercial Activities, and was qualified as an Economist-Manager».

On 6 August 2010, Tananykin became the head of Murmansk, but less than 4 months later, on 30 November 2010, having signed a contract with city manager Sysoev, he announced his resignation.

He was a deputy of the Council of Deputies of Murmansk of the third, fourth convocations.
