= Sergey Subbotin =

Russian mayor (born 1955)

Sergei Subbotin
- Сергей Субботин

4th Mayor of Murmansk
- In office March 2009 – June 2010
- Preceded by: Mikhail Savchenko
- Succeeded by: Stepan Tananykin

Personal details
- Born: Sergei Alexeevich Subbotin; 15 August 1955 (age 70) Yushkovskaya, Russia, Soviet Union
- Party: Independent

Sergei Alexeevich Subbotin (born 15 August 1955, Yushkovskaya village, Arkhangelsk Oblast, USSR) is a Russian politician who the former mayor of Murmansk. He won a surprise victory in March 2009 over United Russia candidate and incumbent mayor Mikhail Savchenko, though he had to resign under pressure of the city deputies in June 2010.

== Career ==
In 1978, he graduated from Kuyibishev aviation institute specialising in pressurized metal processing, and qualified there as a metallurgist engineer. Later in 1987 Mr. Subbotin graduated from Krasnoznamenny Institute under the KGB USSR where he specialized in the sphere of international relations and was qualified as an international economy specialist. In 2002, he took an advanced education at Murmansk Institute of Economy and Law with the specialization in finances and crediting.

From 1980 to 1995, Sergey Alexeyevich worked at national security service. From 1995 to 2002, he was a director general of the Audit Service group (auditing and consulting).

Since 2002 Mr. Subbotin has been at the position of a vice-governor of the Murmansk region, a head of the department in charge of information support and work with administrative authorities. He is a member of the Government of the Murmansk region. Mr. Subbotin is also the leader of inter-departmental council on counteraction against corruption and criminalization of the economy.

Subbotin Sergey Alexeyevich lives in Murmansk and is a citizen of the Russian Federation. Married. Self-elected on the basis of election deposit.

Mr. Subbotin holds 100% shares in Audit Service (management company of audit/consultancy agencies), 76% in AKF Audit Service (association of consulting companies) and 100% in BDO Unikon Murmansk (audit and consulting).

Mr. Subbotin is a member of no party yet allegedly loyal to the mainstream “United Russia”.

39.97% of Murmansk citizens took part in the elections on the second run Sunday, 15 March. Mr. Subbotin was supported by 60.75% of the voters.

On June 3, 2010 Sergey Subbotin was pushed to resign by the City Council on the grounds of improper fulfilment of his duties at the mayor's office.
