= Aban, Russia =

Aban Абан
- Settlement
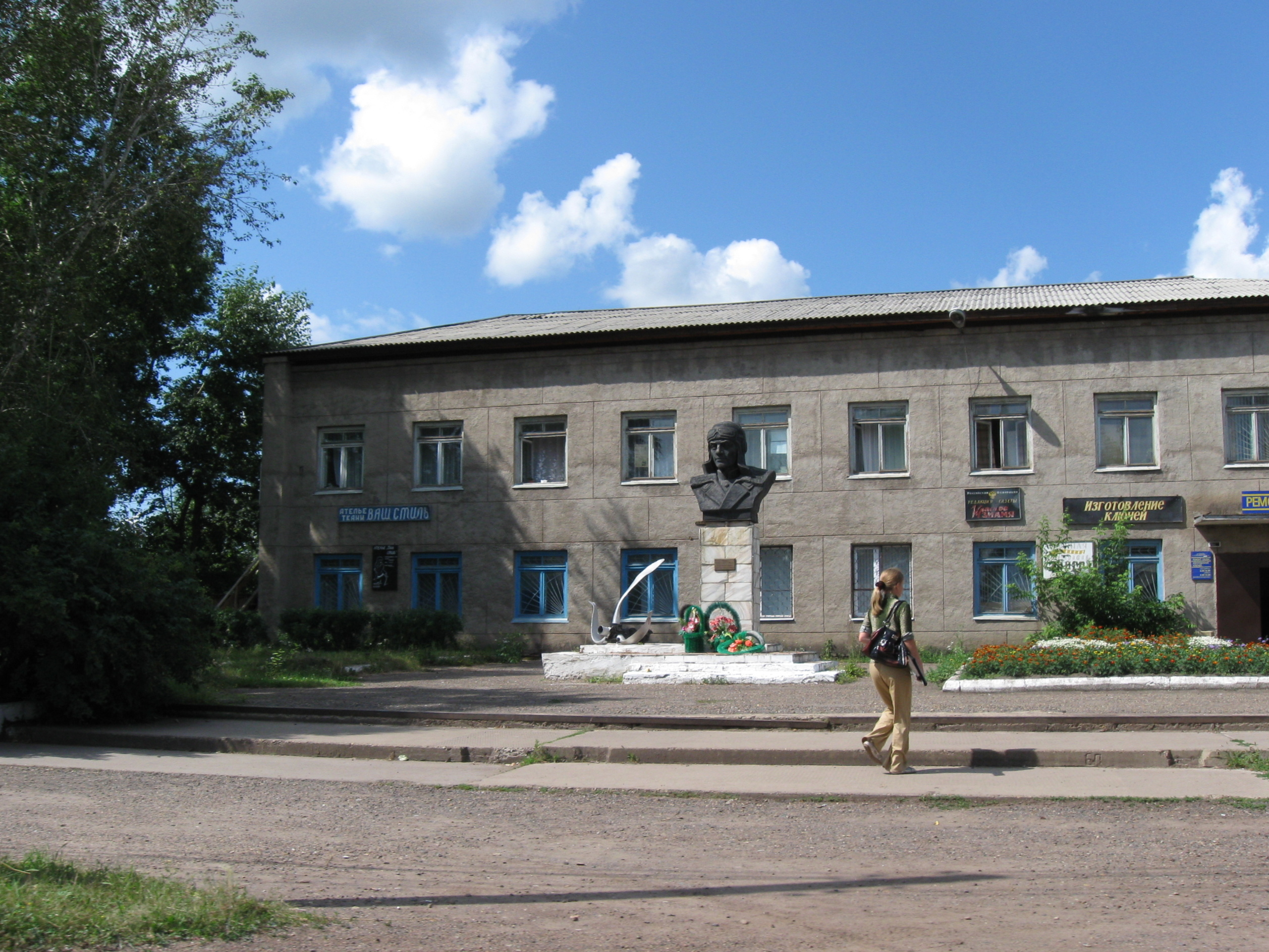
- Bogutskogo Square (August 2009)

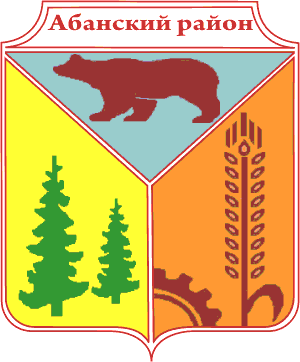
- Coat of arms
- Interactive map of Aban
- Location of Aban Aban (Krasnoyarsk Krai)
- Coordinates: 56°40′N 96°03′E
- Country: Russia
- Federal subject: Krasnoyarsk Krai
- Administrative district: Abansky District
- Selsoviet: Abansky Selsoviet
- First mentioned: 1762
- Rural locality status since: January 1, 2007
- Elevation: 239 m (784 ft)

Population (2010 Census)
  - Total: 9,187
  - Estimate (2021): 8,618 (−6.2%)

Administrative status
  - Capital of: Abansky District, Abansky Selsoviet

Municipal status
  - Municipal district: Abansky Municipal District
  - Rural settlement: Abansky Rural Settlement
  - Capital of: Abansky Municipal District, Abansky Rural Settlement
- Time zone: UTC+7 (MSK+4)
- Postal code: 663740
- Dialing code: +7 39163
- OKTMO ID: 04601401101

Aban (Russian: А́бан) is a rural locality (a settlement) and the administrative center of Abansky District of Krasnoyarsk Krai, Russia. Population: 9,187 (2010 census); 9,823 (2002 census); 10,382 (1989 Soviet census).

== Geography ==
It is located on the Aban River, 62 kilometers (39 mi) northeast of Kansk-Yeniseysky railway station (on the Krasnoyarsk—Irkutsk line).

== History ==
It was first mentioned in 1762. It was granted urban-type settlement status in 1965 and held it until January 1, 2007, when it was demoted in status to that of a settlement of rural type.

== Economy ==
Coal output (the Abansky coal deposit). Logging, timber treatment, creamery, light industry enterprises.

== Mars ==
The name Aban has been used for a crater on the planet Mars by the International Astronomical Union, although not specifically commemorating the village.
