= Tatiana Kusayko =

Russian politician

- Татьяна Кусайко
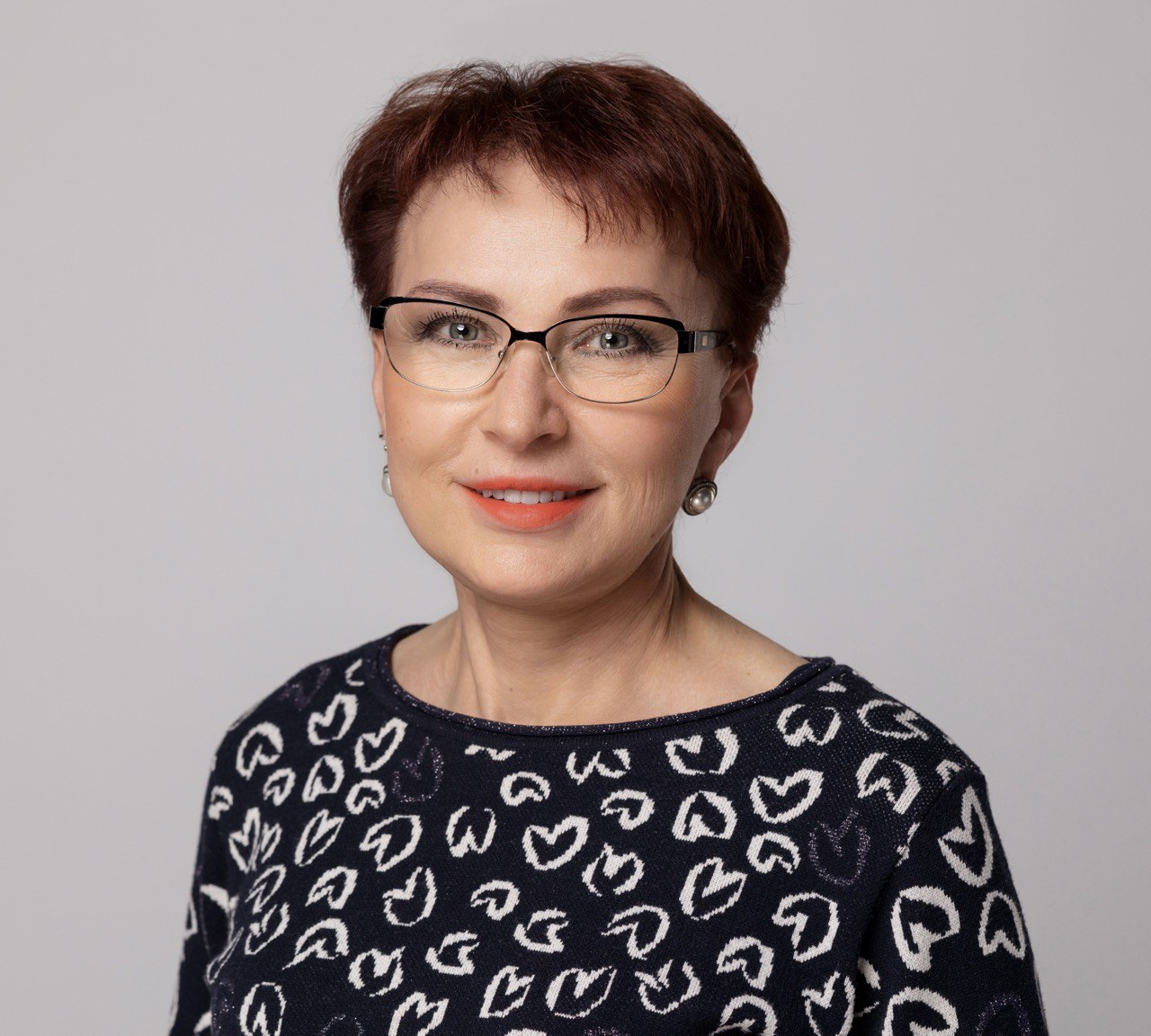

Member of the State Duma for Murmansk Oblast
- Incumbent
- Assumed office 12 October 2021
- Preceded by: Alexey Veller
- Constituency: Murmansk-at-large (No. 128)

Member of the Federation Council
- In office 6 October 2016 – 6 October 2021
- Preceded by: Vladimir Chub
- Succeeded by: Tatiana Sakharova

Personal details
- Born: 15 January 1960 (age 66) Butenky, Kobeliaky Raion, Poltava Oblast, Ukrainian SSR, USSR
- Party: United Russia
- Education: Kharkiv National Medical University

Tatiana Alekseyevna Kusayko (Russian: Татьяна Алексеевна Кусайко; 3 January 1961, Butenky, Kobeliaky Raion) is a Russian political figure. She was a member of the Federation Council between 2016 and 2021 and deputy of the 8th State Duma since 2021.

In 1983, Kusayko graduated from the Kharkiv National Medical University and went to Murmansk to work in a local hospital. In June 2011, she was appointed chief physician of the municipal budgetary healthcare institution "Children's Polyclinic No. 1" in Murmansk. From 2014 to 2016, she was a deputy of the Council of Deputies of the city of Murmansk. In 2016, Kusayko became a member of the All-Russia People's Front central office. On 18 September 2016, she was elected a deputy of the Murmansk Oblast Duma of the 6th convocation for United Russia. In 2016, she ran for the 7th State Duma but was not elected. Instead on 6 October 2016 she was appointed to the Federation Council. In 2021, she was elected for the 8th State Duma.

== Criticism and Assessments ==
A supporter of a healthy lifestyle, she considers it necessary to “put an end to the use of all types of tobacco products.” She co-authored a bill to ban smoking outdoors within less than 10 meters from a building entrance. This proposal was criticized by smoking advocates and the tobacco lobby.

She attributed the demographic crisis to Russian women’s reluctance to have children, stating that many women take on male roles and prioritize their careers. However, she later denied making these statements, claiming that the media had misinterpreted her words, for which she was also criticized.

In January 2021, she ranked 4th in the media rating of members of the Federation Council of the Russian Federation[38] and entered the top tier of the effectiveness ranking based on the number of proposed bills.
