= Abansky District =

Abansky District Абанский район (Russian)
- District
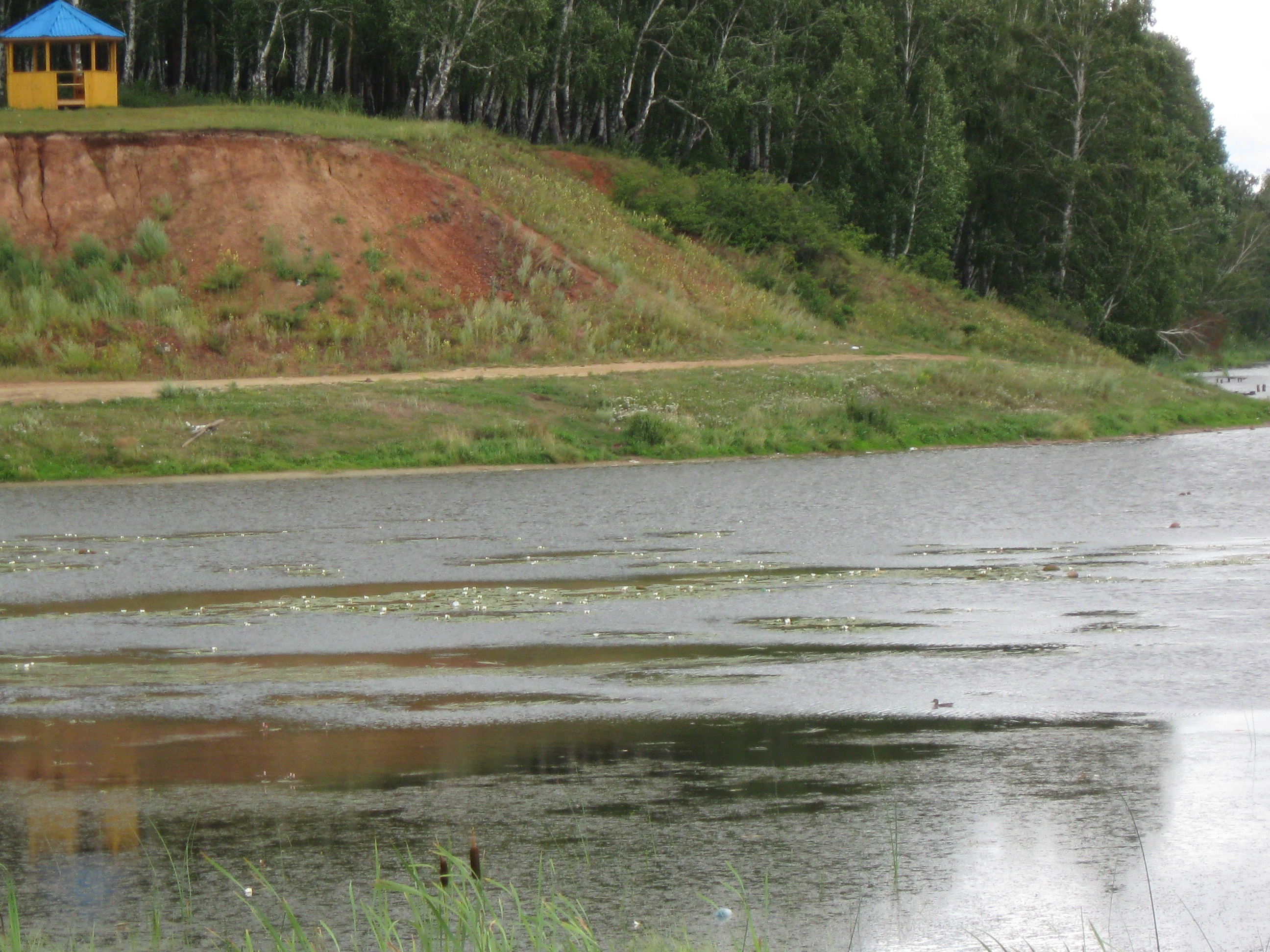
- The Aban River near the settlement of Aban in Abansky District

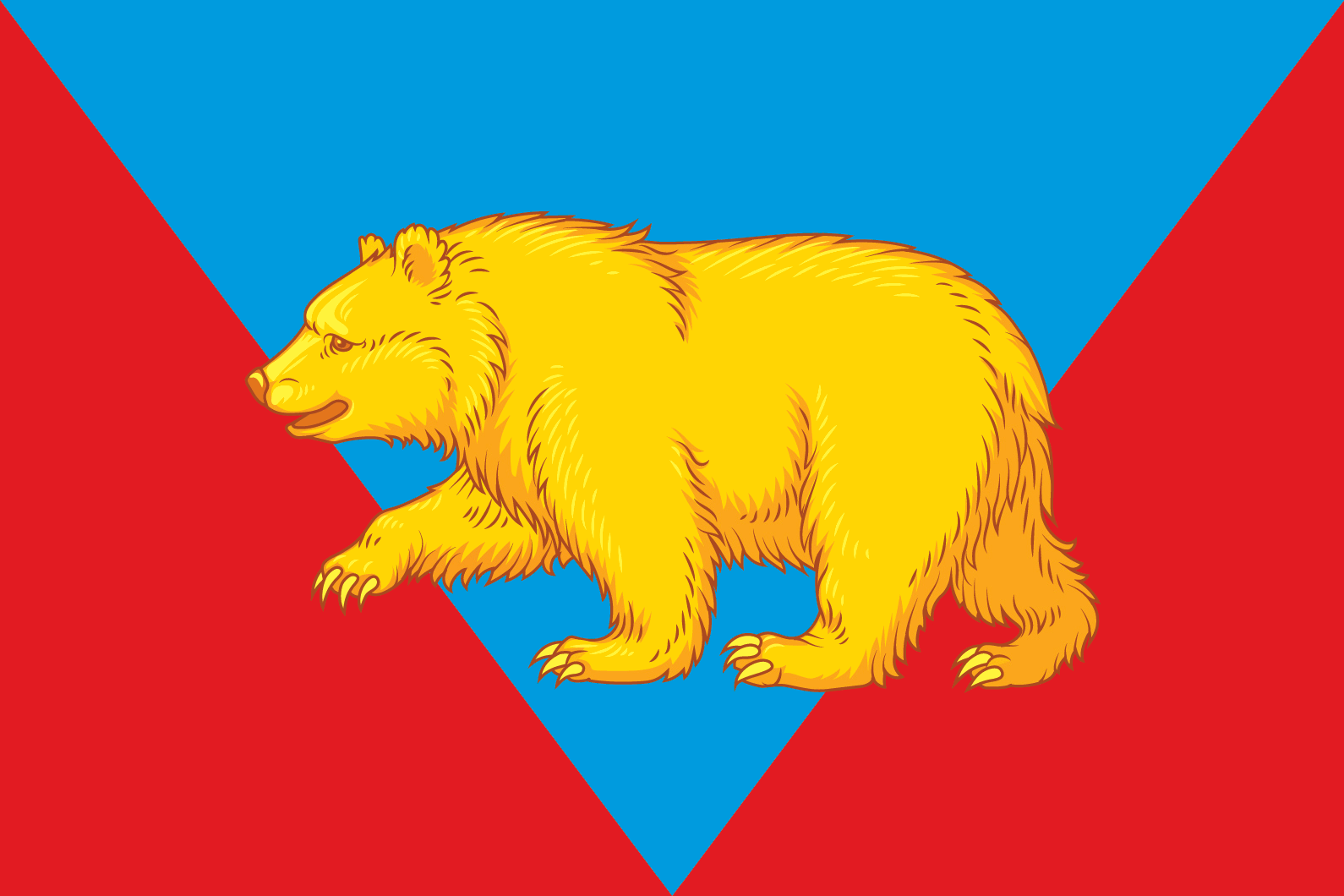
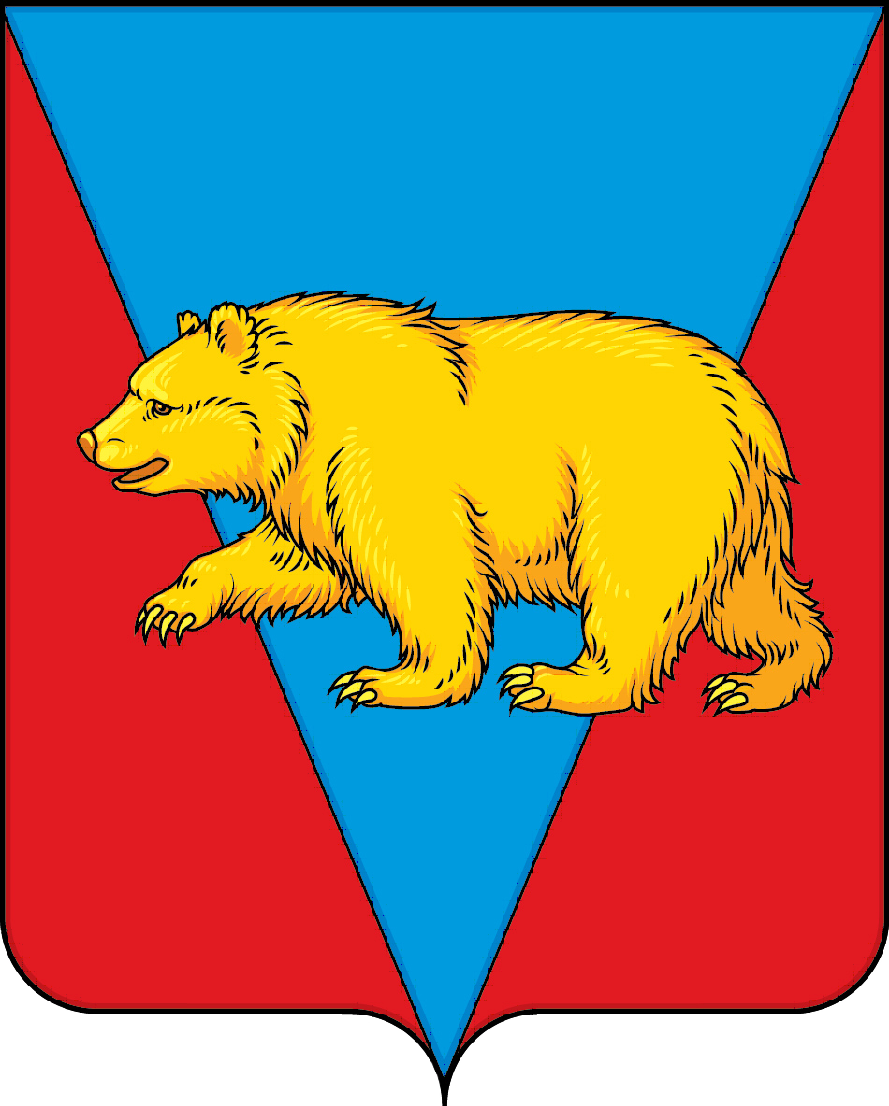
- Flag Coat of arms
- Location of Abansky District in Krasnoyarsk Krai
- Coordinates: 56°N 96°E
- Country: Russia
- Federal subject: Krasnoyarsk Krai
- Established: April 4, 1924
- Administrative center: Aban

Government
  - Type: Local government
  - Body: Abansky District Council of Deputies
  - Head: Mikhail I. Krivitsky

Area
  - Total: 9,512 km^{2} (3,673 sq mi)

Population (2010 Census)
  - Total: 22,577
  - Density: 2.374/km^{2} (6.147/sq mi)
  - Urban: 0%
  - Rural: 100%

Administrative structure
  - Administrative divisions: 16 selsoviet
  - Inhabited localities: 64 rural localities

Municipal structure
  - Municipally incorporated as: Abansky Municipal District
  - Municipal divisions: 0 urban settlements, 16 rural settlements
- Time zone: UTC+7 (MSK+4)
- OKTMO ID: 04601000
- Website: http://abannet.ru

Abansky District (Russian: А́банский райо́н) is an administrative and municipal district (raion), one of the forty-three in Krasnoyarsk Krai, Russia. It is located in the southeast of the krai and borders with Boguchansky District in the north, Irkutsk Oblast in the east, Nizhneingashsky District in the southeast, Ilansky District in the south, Kansky District in the southwest, Dzerzhinsky District in the west, and with Taseyevsky District in the west and northwest. The area of the district is 9,512 square kilometers (3,673 sq mi). Its administrative center is the rural locality (a settlement) of Aban. Population: 22,577 (2010 census); 26,783 (2002 Census); 32,501 (1989 Soviet census).

== Geography ==
The district lies between the forest steppe and taiga zones. It stretches for 124 kilometers (77 mi) from west to east and for 120 kilometers (75 mi) from north to south.

== History ==
The district was founded on April 4, 1924.

Abansky District is characterized by a diversity of its population. Many people voluntarily migrated to this area, but some were exiled here as well. During the 18th–19th centuries, the region was a common destination for exiled insurgents and revolutionaries, including Poles and the Decembrists. Most, however, migrated here voluntarily in the beginning of the 20th century, after the revolutionary events of 1905 and as a result of the agrarian reforms by Pyotr Stolypin.

Migrants typically traveled by rail and arrived in big groups to Kansk. From there, they transported by horses to Aban. The majority of the farms and villages in the area appeared in the first two or three decades of the 20th century. Various ethnic groups tended to stick together for the reasons of common language, traditions, customs, and religious beliefs. This led to the establishment of villages populated mostly by the members of a single ethnic group; for example, Sterlitamak was predominantly Tatar, Vostok was a village of the Chuvash people, while Vorobyovka was populated by the Mordvins.

The second wave of migrants rushed in during the late 1920s, as the area was subject to collectivization on a lesser scale than other regions of the country. New migrants usually moved with their fellow countrymen who had already been well-settled in the area and were able to provide the newcomers with support and assistance. The aspiration to "stick together" further strengthened and unified already tight ethnic communities. Even after settling in, people continued to speak their native language and maintained their customs and traditions, passing them on to the new generations. However, they also had to master Russian, as it was the language of communication between various ethnic groups and the language of the government.

Various ethnic communities lived in peace and friendship, respecting each other's customs and sharing the best practices and experiences. Eventually, over time, the cultures blended together, creating a group which is now described by the term "Siberians".

After World War II, many people exiled here started families; many remained to live and work in the district.

In the 1960s, Aban became a destination for people exiled from the big cities under the "Decree of 1961"—people were sent here for their religious beliefs, for drunkenness, and for parasitism. As a result, the social composition of the population changed significantly. While the 1930s–1940s saw an influx of educated people and intellectuals sent here for political reasons, a significant portion of the exiles of the 1960s consisted of the people genuinely unwilling to work and "re-educated" by means of forcing them to work on forest plots. Five commandants were assigned to Abansky District to oversee the forced labor.

The villages of Machino, Tagashi, Noshino, and Beryozovka housed Germans who were deported here after the end of World War II. The deported Germans were required to register with the local commandant twice a month and were prohibited from leaving their assigned residences. Many Germans were separated from their families, and only in the 1980s they were allowed to leave.

== Economy ==
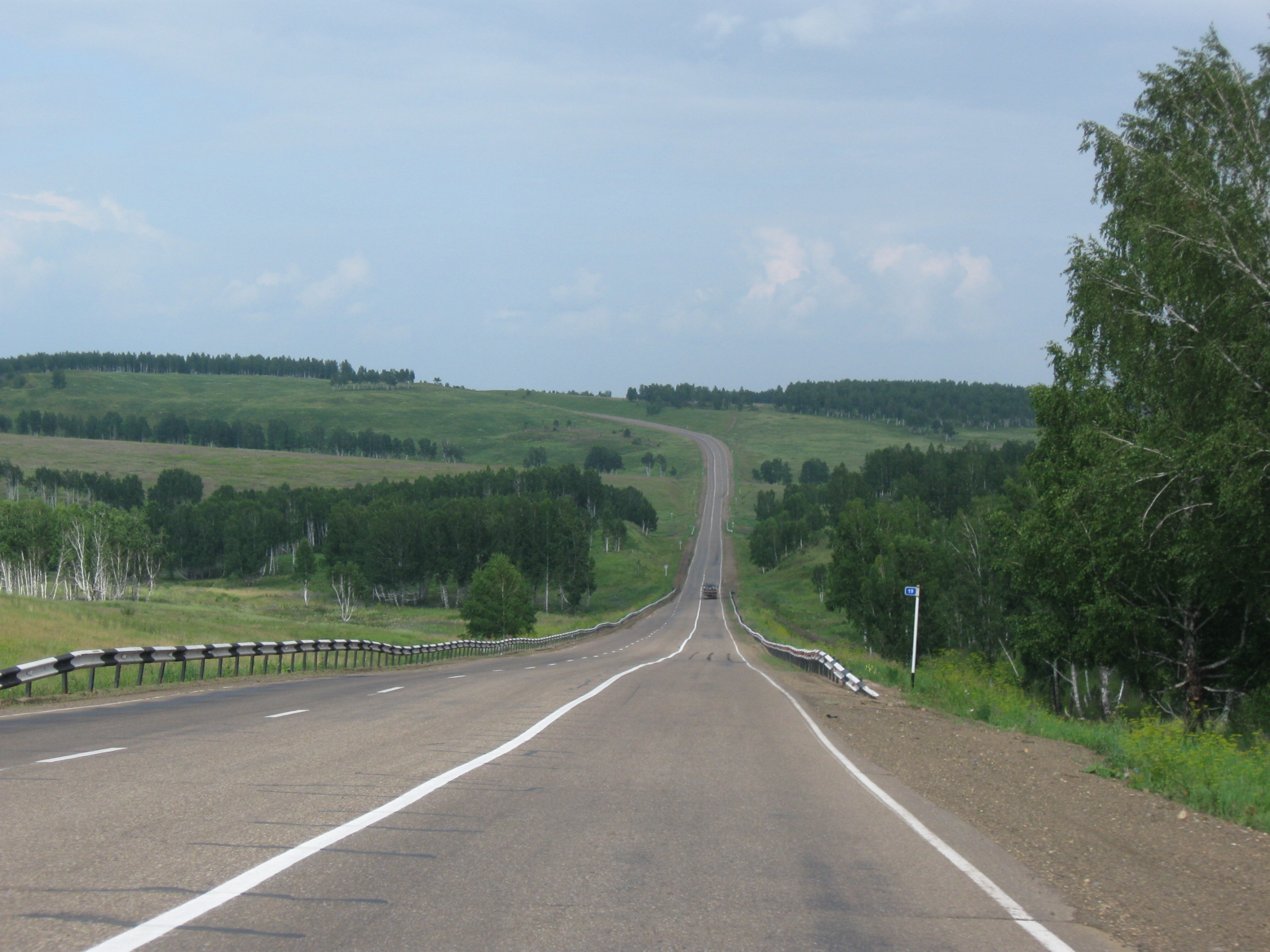
Kansk–Aban auto route

Agriculture and forestry, at 55.6%, comprise the largest share of the district's economy, followed by the wholesale and retail trade and auto maintenance (18%).

Abansky District is one of the top agricultural districts in the krai in terms of production volume. The district specializes in grain crops and their processing. Animal husbandry specializes in pig- and cattle-breeding.

The district is rich in timber and coal reserves.

== Education ==
Fifty-seven educational facilities are located in the district:

- 11 pre-school facilities
- 43 secondary schools
- 1 inter-school educational-industrial complex
- 2 continuous education establishments for children

Thirty-four per cent of children between ages one and eleven are covered by the pre-school educational system.

== Public health services ==
There are three hospitals with the total of 211 beds in the district, in addition to 4 clinics. There are on average 14.3 doctors per 10,000 people and 7.7 medical workers per 1,000 people.

Medicinal Lake Plakhino (Borovoye) is located in the district.
