= Aban (name) =

Aban is a masculine given name and surname of Arabic origin. Notable people with the name include:

== Given name ==
- Aban ibn Abi Ayyash, Persian author
- Aban Elias, Iraqi American civil engineer
- Aban ibn Mu'awiya ibn Hisham (died 751), Umayyad prince and commander
- Aban Marker Kabraji (born 1953), Pakistani biologist and academic
- Aban al-Lahiqi (750–815/16), Persian court poet
- Aban ibn Marwan, Umayyad prince and governor
- Aban Pestonjee, Sri Lankan businesswomen
- Aban ibn Sa'id, Arab companion of the prophet Muhammad
- Aban Sudrajat (born 1996), Indonesian craftsman, artist, and environmental activist
- Aban ibn Taghlib (died 758), Iraqi Shia scholar and Quran reciter
- Aban ibn al-Walid ibn Uqba, Umayyad governor
- Aban ibn Uthman (641–723), one of the Tabi'un and son of Uthman
- Abane Ramdane (1920–1957), Algerian political activist and revolutionary

== Surname ==
- Aaron Aban (born 1982), Filipino basketball player
- Gonzalo Abán (born 1987), Argentine footballer
