= Nizhny Ingash =

Nizhny Ingash Ни́жний Инга́ш
- Town
- Interactive map of Nizhny Ingash
- Location of Nizhny Ingash Nizhny Ingash (Krasnoyarsk Krai)
- Coordinates: 56°12′4″N 96°32′22″E
- Country: Russia
- Federal subject: Krasnoyarsk Krai
- Administrative district: Nizhneingashsky District
- District townSelsoviet: Nizhneingashsky
- Founded: 1775
- Town status since: 1961

Population
  - Estimate (2013): 7,252 )

Administrative status
  - Capital of: Nizhneingashsky

Municipal status
  - Municipal district: Nizhneingashsky Municipal District
  - Urban settlement: Nizhneingashsky Urban Settlement>
  - Capital of: Nizhneingashsky Municipal District, Nizhneingashsky Urban Settlement
- Time zone: UTC+7 (MSK+4)
- Postal code: 663850
- Dialing code: +7 39171
- OKTMO ID: 04639151051

Nizhny Ingash (Russian: Ни́жний Инга́ш) is an urban-type settlement and the administrative center of Nizhneingashsky District, Krasnoyarsk Krai, Russia. Train station on the line Ingashskaya Krasnoyarsk - Taishet. It had population 7460 inhabitants in 2007. The settlement was founded in 1775. Town status was given in 1961.
