= Nizhneingashsky District =

Nizhneingashsky District Нижнеингашский район (Russian)
- District
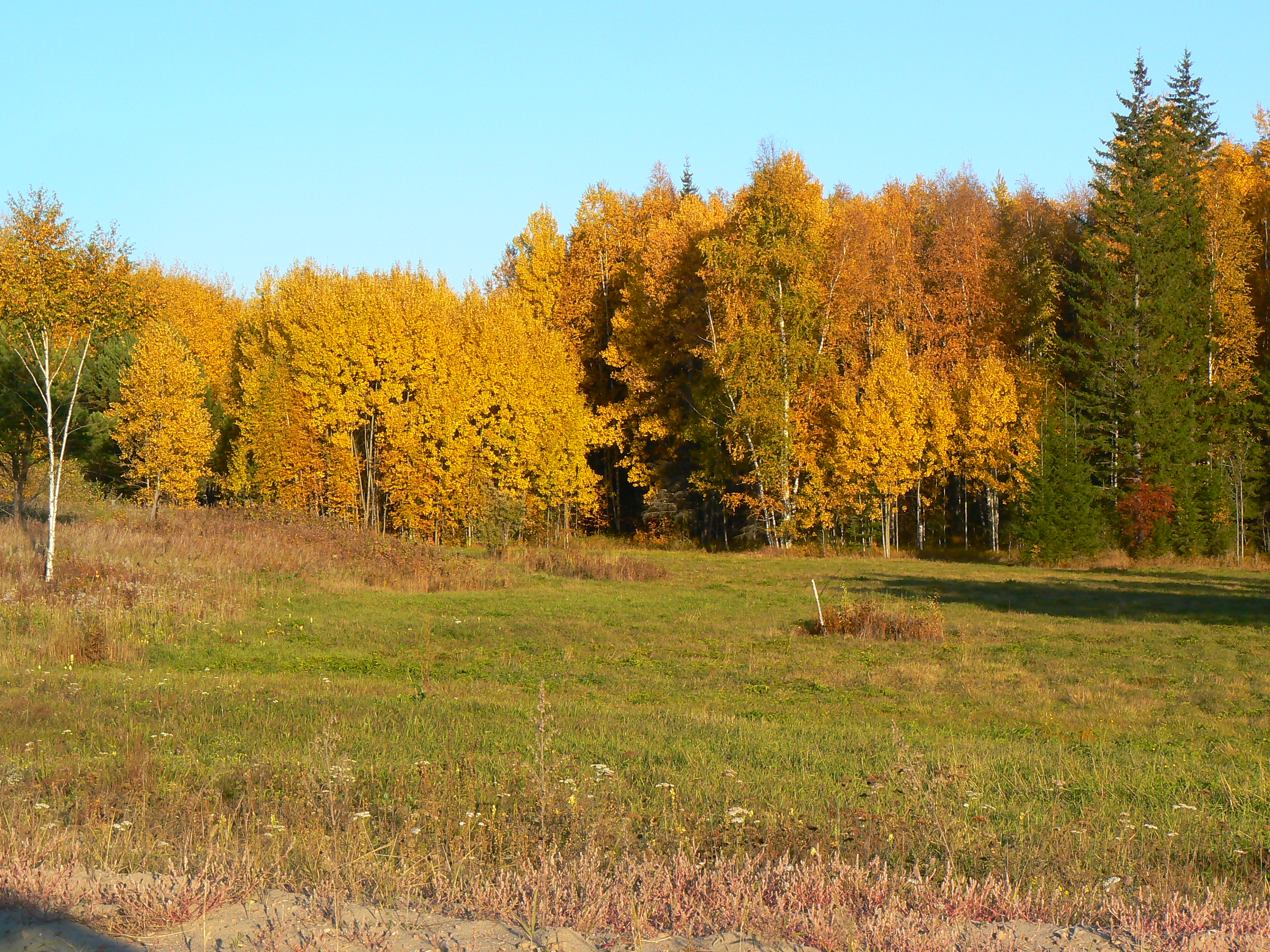
- Forest in Nizhneingashsky District

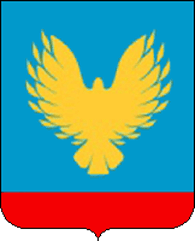
- Flag Coat of arms
- Location of Nizhneingashsky District in Krasnoyarsk Krai
- Coordinates: 56°12′N 96°31′E
- Country: Russia
- Federal subject: Krasnoyarsk Krai
- Established: April 4, 1924
- Administrative center: Nizhny Ingash

Government
  - Type: Local government
  - Body: Nizhneingashsky District Council of Deputies
  - Head: Pyotr A. Malyshkin

Area
  - Total: 6,143 km^{2} (2,372 sq mi)

Population (2010 Census)
  - Total: 33,439
  - Estimate (January 2017): 29,822
  - Density: 5.443/km^{2} (14.10/sq mi)
  - Urban: 62.6%
  - Rural: 37.4%

Administrative structure
  - Administrative divisions: 2 Urban-type settlements, 14 Selsoviets
  - Inhabited localities: 2 urban-type settlements, 61 rural localities

Municipal structure
  - Municipally incorporated as: Nizhneingashsky Municipal District
  - Municipal divisions: 2 urban settlements, 14 rural settlements
- Time zone: UTC+7 (MSK+4)
- OKTMO ID: 04639000
- Website: http://www.ingash-admin.ru

Population of Nizhneingashsky District
- 2010 Census: 33,439
- 2002 Census: 39,391
- 1989 Census: 43,800
- 1979 Census: 49,927

Nizhneingashsky District (Russian: Нижнеинга́шский райо́н) is an administrative and municipal district (raion), one of the forty-three in Krasnoyarsk Krai, Russia. It is located in the southeast of the krai and borders Abansky District in the north, Irkutsk Oblast in the east and southeast, and Ilansky District in the south and west. The area of the district is 6,143 square kilometers (2,372 sq mi). Its administrative center is the urban locality (an urban-type settlement) of Nizhny Ingash. As of the 2010 Census, the total population of the district was 33,439, with the population of Nizhny Ingash accounting for 22.7% of that number.

== History ==
The district was founded on April 4, 1924.

== Government ==
As of 2015–2020, the Head of the district is Pyotr A. Malyshkin.

== Economy ==
=== Transportation ===
The Trans-Siberian Railway runs through the district from west to east. A part of the federal highway M53 passes through the district as well.
