= Aban Elias =

Aban Abdel Malek Mahmoud Elias was an Iraqi American civil engineer who was born in Iraq, lived in Denver, Colorado, then returned to Iraq to help the people build back the country from the mass destructions that happened in the war with Iran. According to this brother, Elias worked with a relative on road projects. He was kidnapped on May 3, 2004, near his home in Baghdad. He was shown being held hostage in a video on Al Arabiya television station. While blindfolded and posed against a stone wall, he was shown pleading for help. A transcript provided by Al Arabiya quoted him as saying in English:

"My name is Aban Elias from Denver, Colorado. I am a civil engineer working in Baghdad ... and we are working with the Pentagon. ... I was kidnapped, and I call upon Muslim organizations to interfere to release me."

As an engineer working on road projects in Iraq, he would reportedly coordinate with the Pentagon. He has not been seen or heard from since. Aban Elias was married and had three sons, who were aged 1, 4 and 6 at the time of his kidnapping.

== See also ==
- List of kidnappings
- List of people who disappeared mysteriously: post-1970
