= Ilansky District =

Ilansky District Иланский район (Russian)
- District
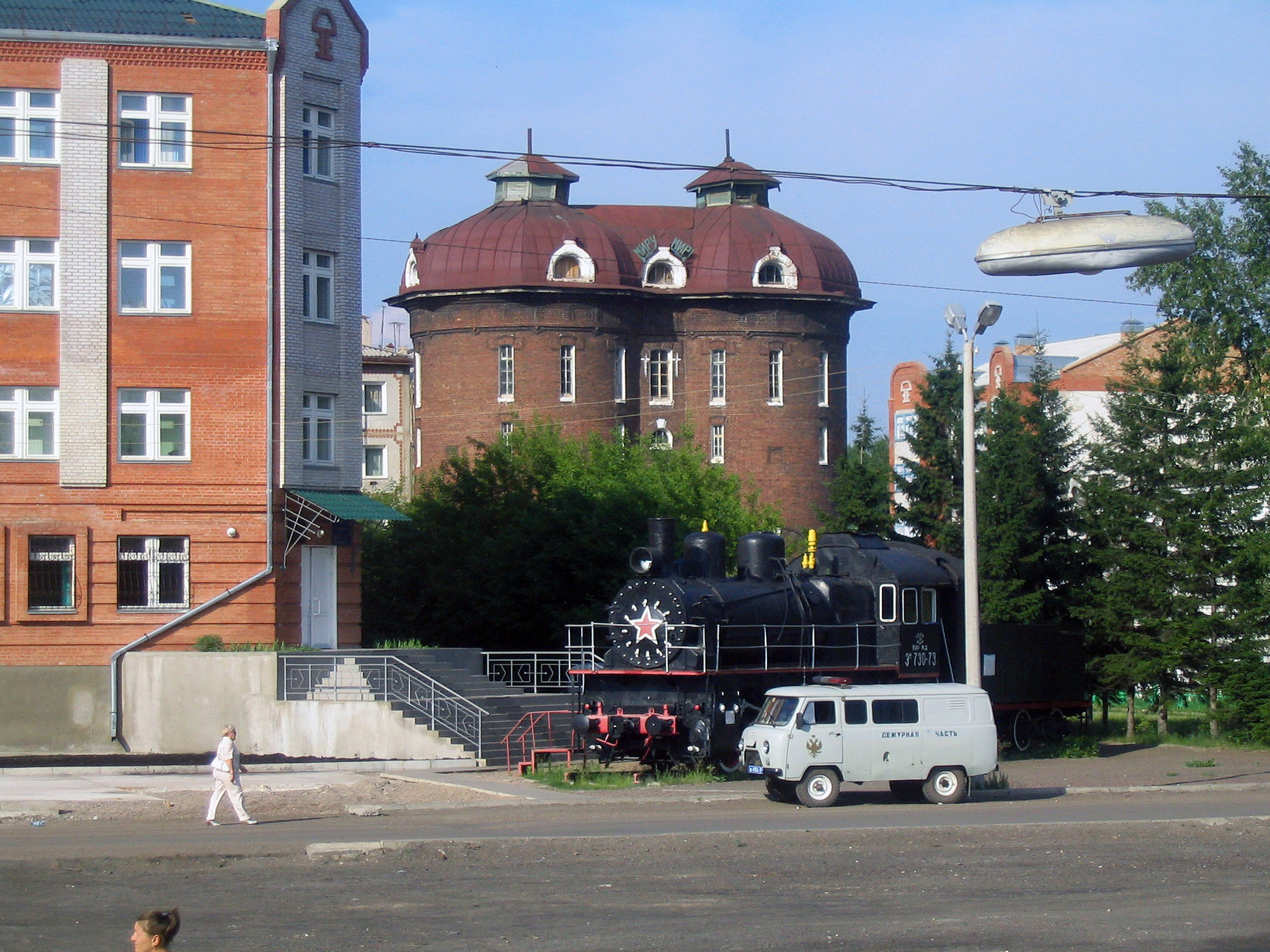
- A memorial train near Ilanskaya railway station in the town of Ilansky, Ilansky District

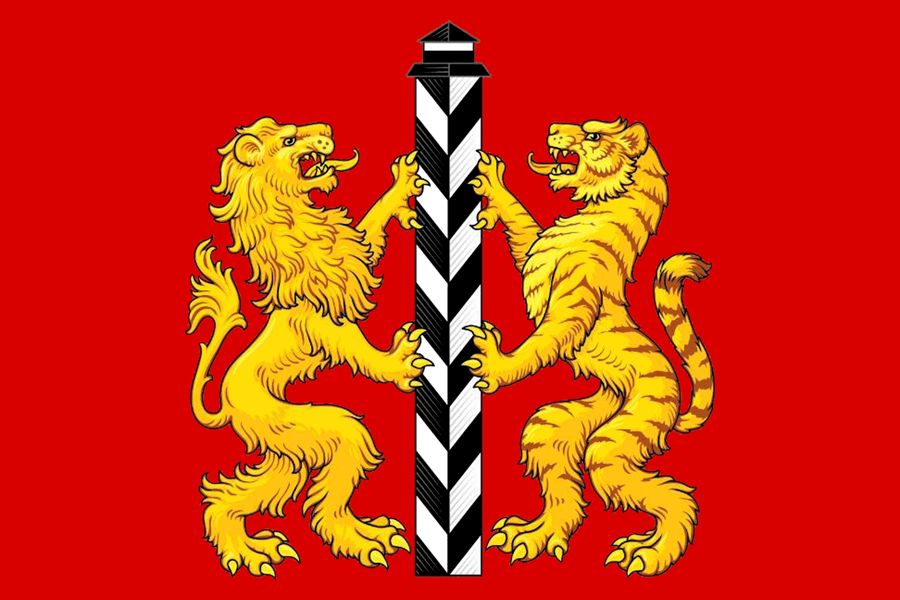
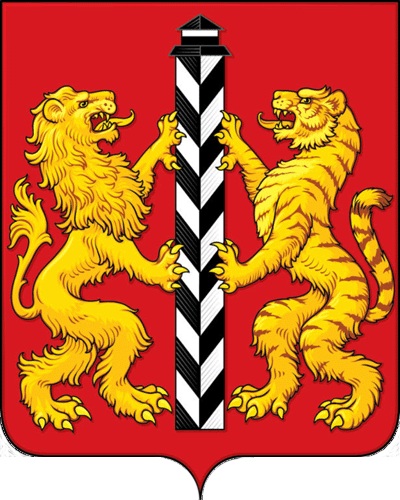
- Flag Coat of arms
- Location of Ilansky District in Krasnoyarsk Krai
- Coordinates: 56°14′N 96°04′E
- Country: Russia
- Federal subject: Krasnoyarsk Krai
- Established: November 7, 1939
- Administrative center: Ilansky

Government
  - Type: Local government
  - Body: Ilansky District Council of Deputies
  - Head: Olga A. Alkhimenko

Area
  - Total: 3,750 km^{2} (1,450 sq mi)

Population (2010 Census)
  - Total: 25,899
  - Density: 6.91/km^{2} (17.9/sq mi)
  - Urban: 62.2%
  - Rural: 37.8%

Administrative structure
  - Administrative divisions: 1 District towns, 9 Selsoviets
  - Inhabited localities: 1 cities/towns, 39 rural localities

Municipal structure
  - Municipally incorporated as: Ilansky Municipal District
  - Municipal divisions: 1 urban settlements, 9 rural settlements
- Time zone: UTC+7 (MSK+4)
- OKTMO ID: 04618000
- Website: http://adm-ilansk.ru/

Ilansky District (Russian: Ила́нский райо́н) is an administrative and municipal district (raion), one of the forty-three in Krasnoyarsk Krai, Russia. It is located in the southeast of the krai and borders with Abansky District in the north, Nizhneingashsky District in the east, Irbeysky District in the south, Irkutsk Oblast in the southeast, and with Kansky District in the west. The area of the district is 3,750 square kilometers (1,450 sq mi). Its administrative center is the town of Ilansky. Population: 25,899 (2010 census). The population of the administrative center accounts for 62.2% of the district's total population.

== History ==
The district was founded on November 7, 1939.

== Government ==
As of 2013, the Head of the District and the Chairman of the District Council is Olga A. Alkhimenko.

== Demographics ==
Population
1989 Census	1995	2000	2001	2002 Census	2003	2004	2005	2010 Census
31,949	30,700	28,900	28,500	28,139	27,600	27,100	26,700	25,899

== Economy ==
=== Transportation ===
The Trans-Siberian Railway runs through the district from west to east. A part of M53 Highway passes through the district as well.
