= Ilansky (town) =

Town in Krasnoyarsk Krai, Russia

Ilansky Иланский
- Town
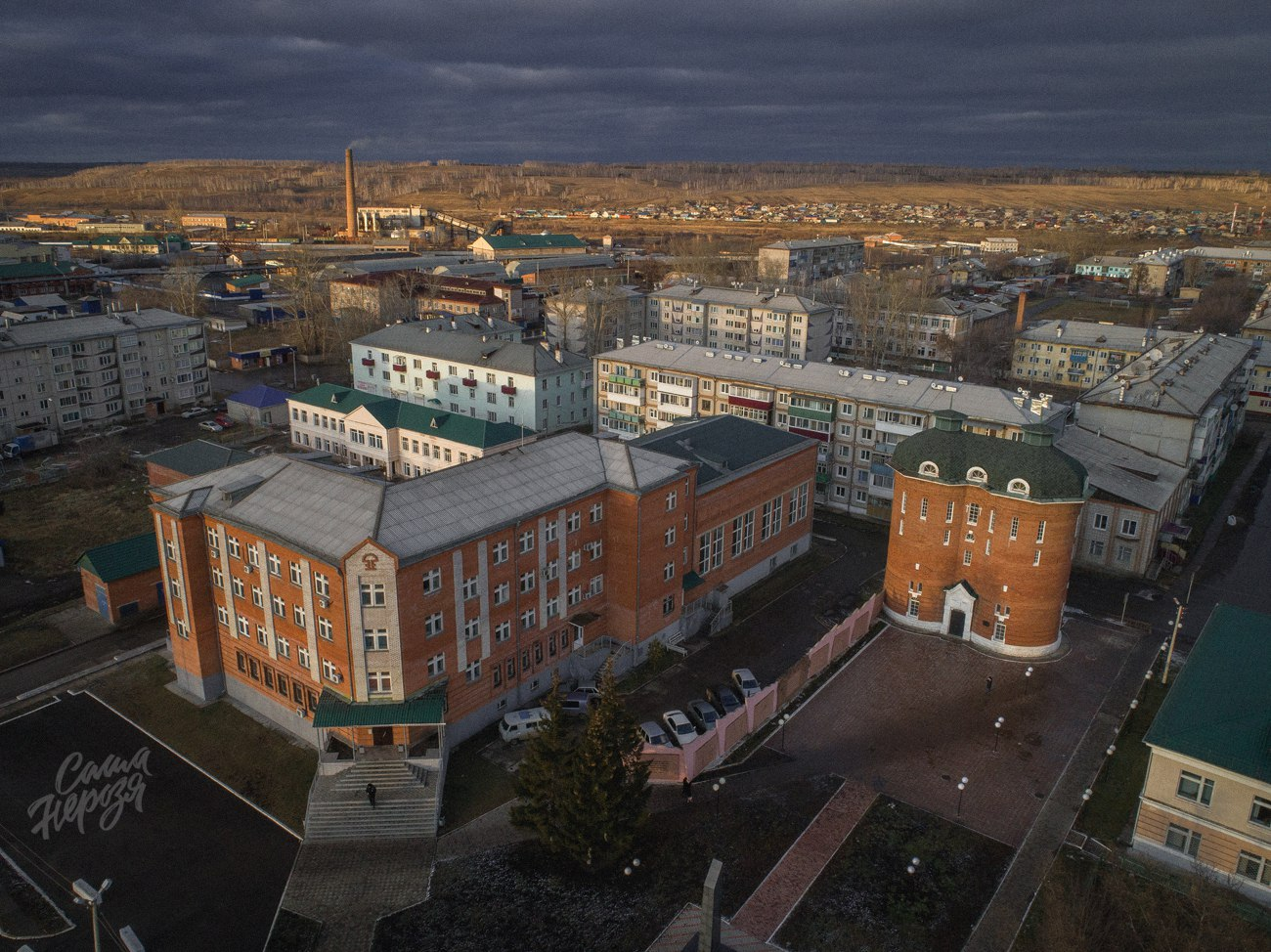
- View of Ilansky

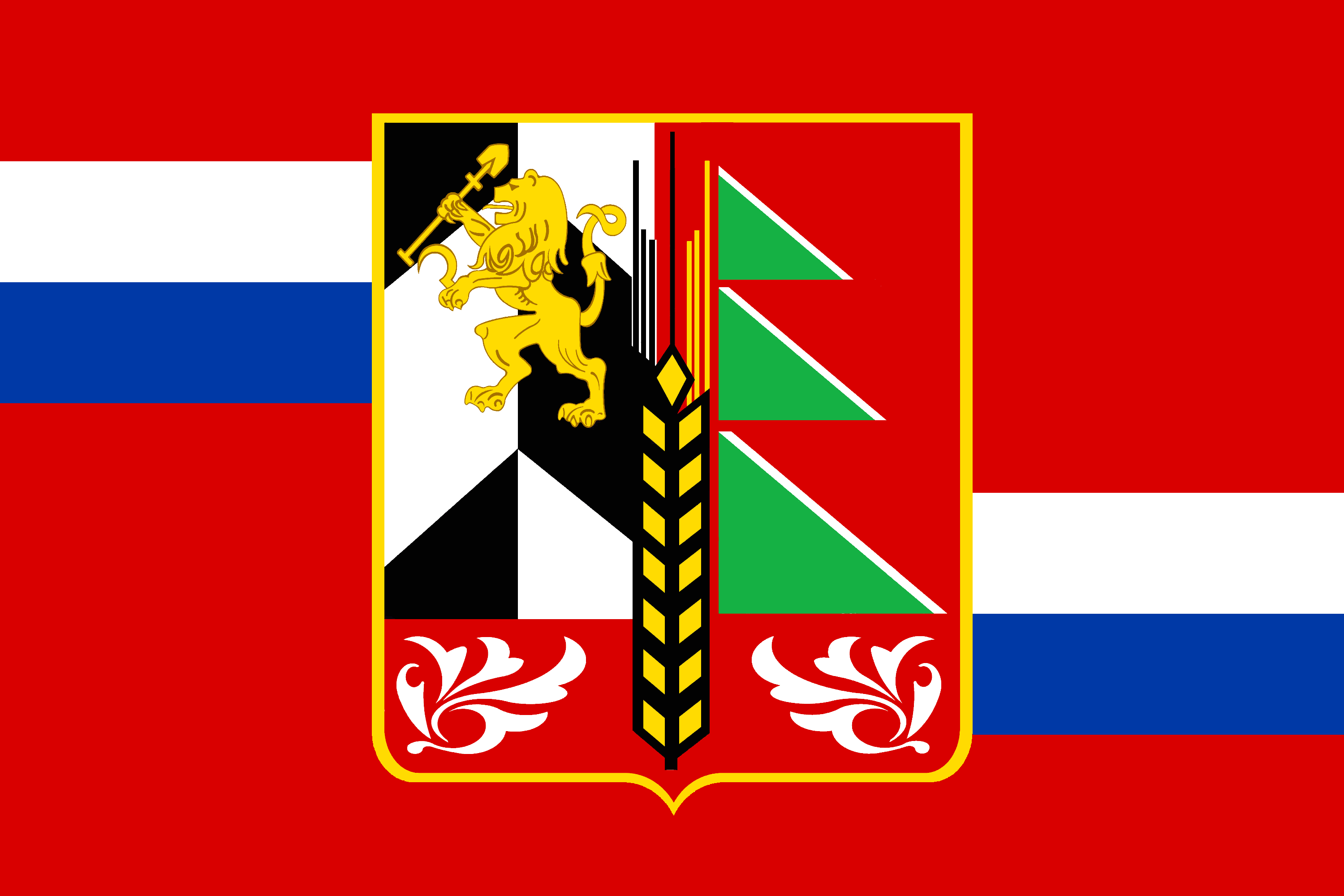
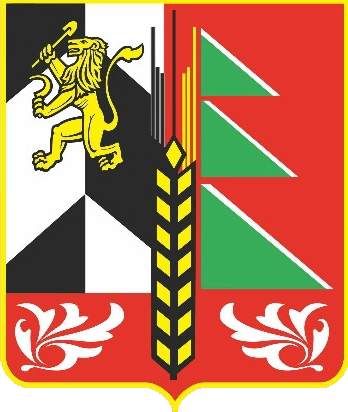
- Flag Coat of arms
- Interactive map of Ilansky
- Location of Ilansky Ilansky (Krasnoyarsk Krai)
- Coordinates: 56°14′29″N 96°03′29″E
- Country: Russia
- Federal subject: Krasnoyarsk Krai
- Administrative district: Ilansky District
- District townSelsoviet: Ilansky
- Founded: 1645
- Town status since: 1939
- Elevation: 280 m (920 ft)

Population (2010 Census)
  - Total: 16,111
  - Estimate (2021): 15,945 (−1%)

Administrative status
  - Capital of: Ilansky District, district town of Ilansky

Municipal status
  - Municipal district: Ilansky Municipal District
  - Urban settlement: Ilansky Urban Settlement
  - Capital of: Ilansky Municipal District, Ilansky Urban Settlement
- Time zone: UTC+7 (MSK+4)
- Postal code: 663800–663801
- OKTMO ID: 04618101001

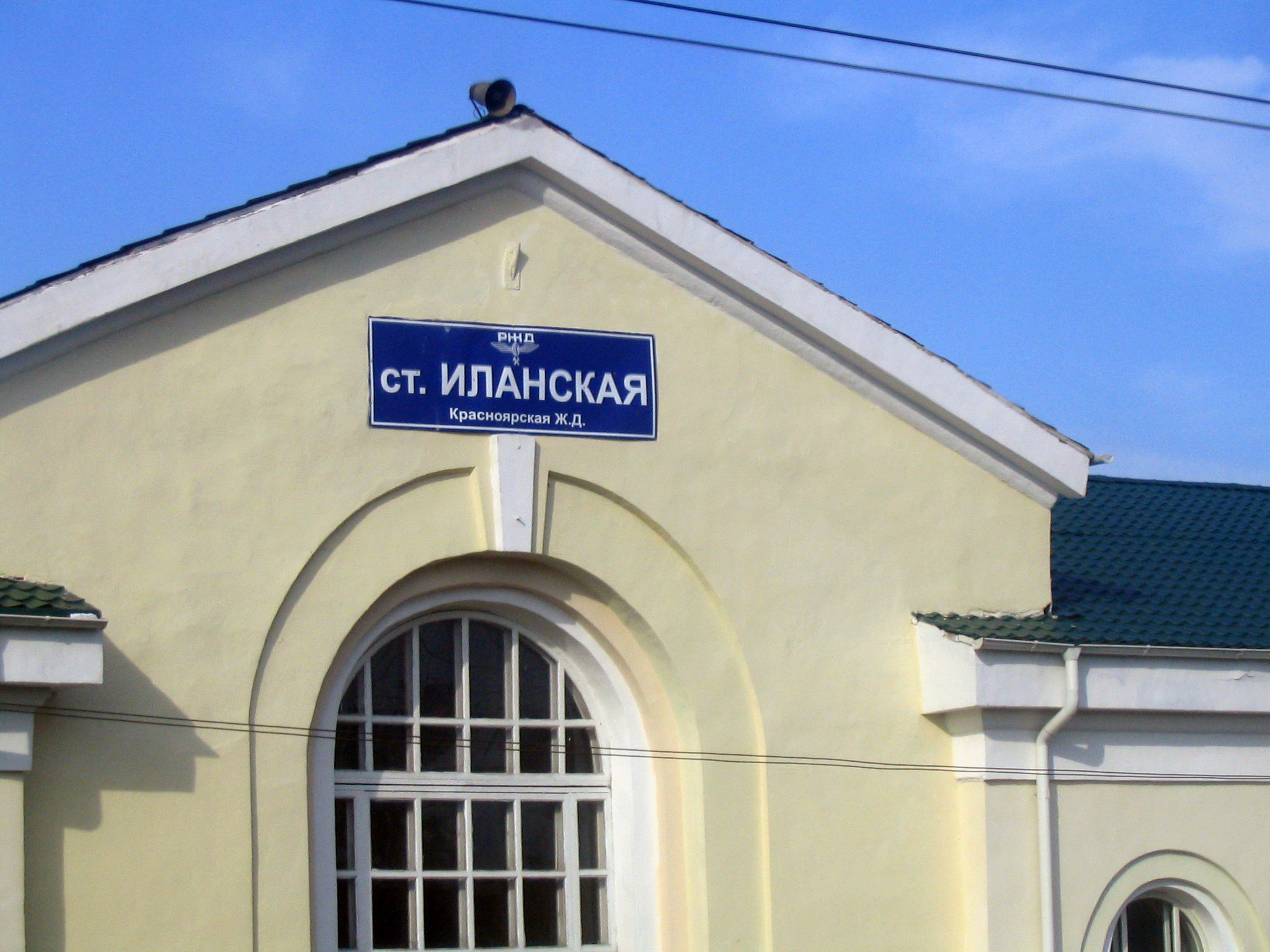
Ilanskaya railway station on the Trans-Siberian railway

Ilansky (Russian: Ила́нский) is a town and the administrative center of Ilansky District of Krasnoyarsk Krai, Russia, located on the Ilanka River 279 kilometers (173 mi) east of Krasnoyarsk. Population: 16,111 (2010 census); 17,073 (2002 census); 18,409 (1989 Soviet census).

== History ==
It was founded in 1645 as the village of Ilanskaya (Ила́нская). Town status was granted to it in 1939.

== Administrative and municipal status ==
Within the framework of administrative divisions, Ilansky serves as the administrative center of Ilansky District. As an administrative division, it is, together with the village of Algasy, incorporated within Ilansky District as the district town of Ilansky. As a municipal division, the district town of Ilansky is incorporated within Ilansky Municipal District as Ilansky Urban Settlement.

== In popular culture ==
Prominently featured as a time rift location at alternative history sci-fi Kirov novel series.
