= Raisa Karmazina =

Russian politician (born 1951)

- Раиса Кармазина
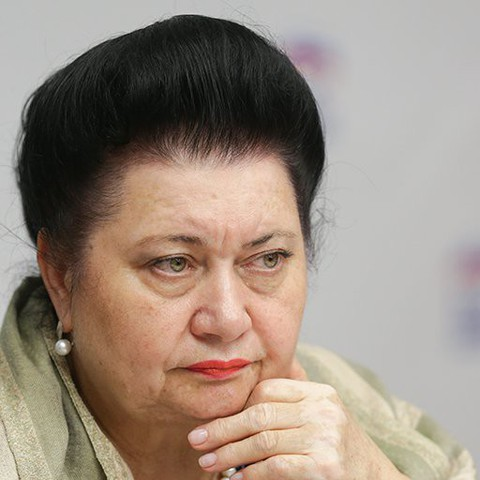

Member of the State Duma
- Incumbent
- Assumed office 29 December 2003

Personal details
- Born: 9 January 1951 (age 75) Rostov-on-Don, Russian Soviet Federative Socialist Republic, USSR
- Party: United Russia
- Education: Rostov State University of Economics

Raisa Karmazina (Russian: Раиса Васильевна Кармазина; born January 9, 1951, Rostov-on-Don) is a Russian political figure and deputy of the 4th, 5th, 6th, 7th, and 8th State Dumas.

Karmazina was born to a family of Don Cossacks. From 1978 to 1993, she headed the Norilsk branch of the State Bank of the USSR. In 1980, she was elected deputy of the Norilsk City Council; and from 1990 to 1993, she was the deputy of Krasnoyarsk Council of People's Deputies. In December 2001, she became the deputy of the Legislative Assembly of Krasnoyarsk Krai. On December 7, 2003, Karmazina was elected deputy of the 4th State Duma. She was re-elected in 2007, 2011, 2016, and 2021 for the 5th, 6th, 7th, and 8th State Dumas respectively. In October 2021, she was appointed the head of the Counting Commission of the State Duma.

== Sanctions ==
She was sanctioned by the UK government in 2022 in relation to the Russo-Ukrainian War.
