= Aban (river) =

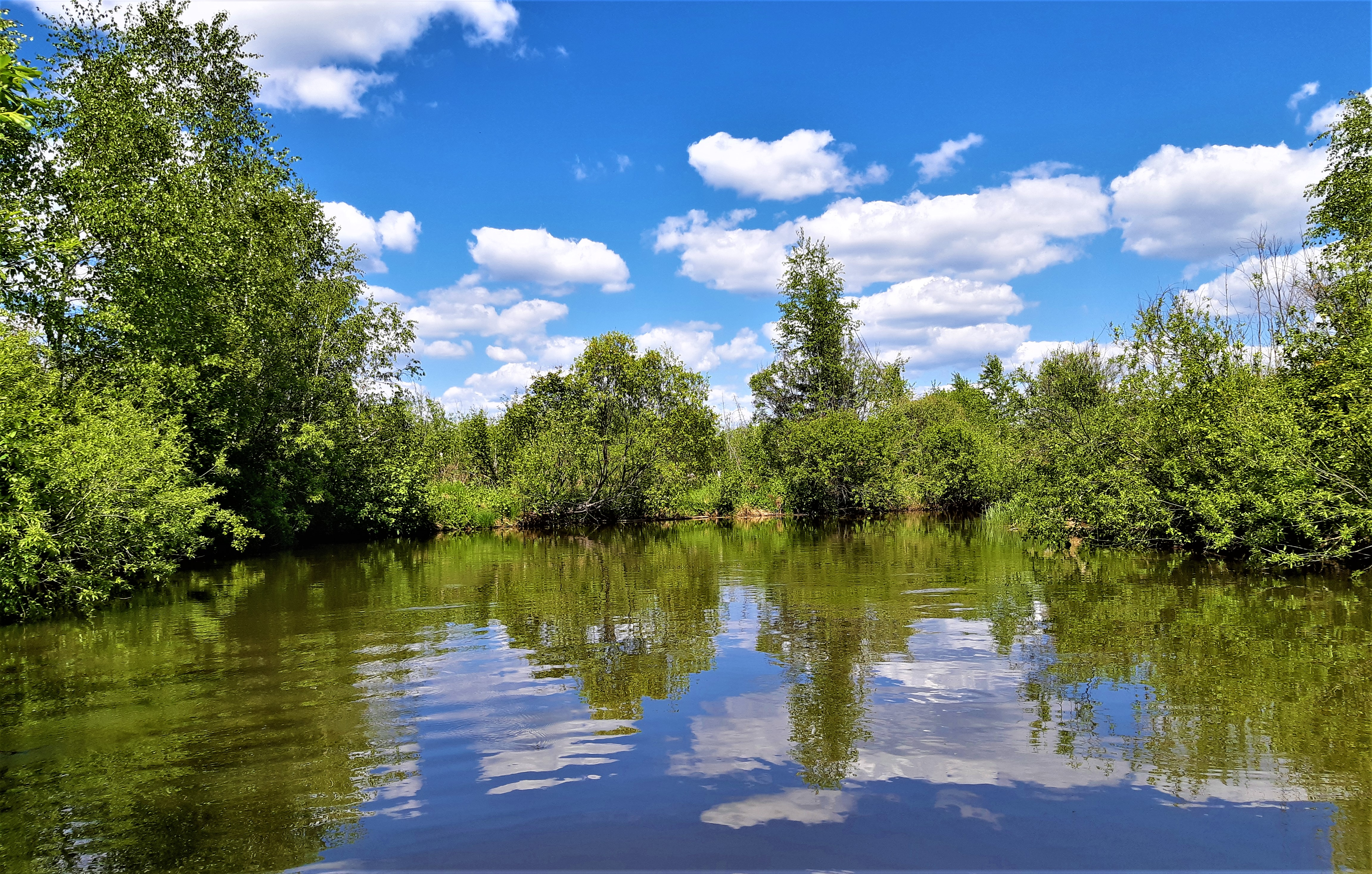

- Mouth

Location
- Country: Russia

Physical characteristics
- Mouth: Usolka
  - coordinates: 57°01′11″N 95°08′36″E
- Length: 151 km (94 mi)
- Basin size: 1,970 km^{2} (760 sq mi)

Basin features
- Progression: Usolka→ Taseyeva→ Angara→ Yenisey→ Kara Sea

The Aban (Russian: Абан) is a river in Krasnoyarsk Krai, Russia. It is a right tributary of the Usolka and belongs to the Yenisey basin. It is 151 kilometres (94 mi) long, and has a drainage basin of 1,970 square kilometres (760 sq mi).
