= Zuyev =

Zuyev, sometimes spelled as Zuev (Russian: Зуев), or Zuyeva (feminine; Зуева), is a Russian surname derived from the word зуй (zooy). Notable people with the surname include:

- Aleksandr Zuyev (disambiguation), multiple people
- Aleksei Zuev (born 1981), a Russian football (soccer) goalkeeper
- Alexei Zuev (born 1982), Russian pianist
- Anastasia Zuyeva (disambiguation), multiple people
- Nikolai Zuyev (disambiguation), multiple people
- Sergey Zuev (born 1980), Russian futsal player
- Sergey Zuev (economist) (born 1954), Russian economist
- Vasily Zuyev (1754–1794), Russian naturalist, explorer, and academician
- Viktar Zuyev (born 1983), Belarusian heavyweight boxer
- Vladimir Zuev (disambiguation), multiple people
- Yury Zuev (1932–2006), Russian sinologist and turkologist

== See also ==
- Orekhovo-Zuyevo
