= Viktor Panin =

- Count Viktor Nikitich Panin (1801-1862), politician
- Viktor Yevgenievich Panin (1930-2020), physicist
