= Sergey Psakhie =

Russian physicist and academic

- Born: 2 March 1952; Tomsk, Russian Federation, Soviet Union
- Died: 22 December 2018 (aged 66); Tomsk, Tomsk Region, Russia
- Citizenship: Soviet Union → Russia
- Education: National Research Tomsk State University
- Known for: Movable cellular automaton method
- Scientific career
- Fields: solid-state physics, solid mechanics, plastic deformation
- Workplaces: National Research Tomsk State University, Institute of Strength Physics and Materials Science SB RAS
- Doctoral advisor: Viktor Panin
- Other academic advisors: Viktor Panin

Sergey Psakhie (2 March 1952 – 22 December 2018) was a Russian physicist, Chairman of the Presidium of the Tomsk Scientific Center of the Siberian Division of the Russian Academy of Sciences. He was the author and co-author of more than two hundred scientific papers, including five monographs.

== Curriculum vitae ==
- 1991 — Professor at Tomsk State University
- 1994–1995 — Visiting professor at North Carolina State University. Member of New York Academy of Sciences
- 2002 — Director of Institute of Strength Physics and Materials Science SB RAS
- 2006 — Professor of Tomsk Polytechnic University, Head of Department

== Scientific achievements ==
- Development of methods of discrete mechanics and their application to solving problems of computer-aided design of new materials (Movable cellular automaton method, cellular automaton method, molecular dynamics method)
- Investigation of the laws of deformation and fracture of brittle materials
- Regularities in the formation of dynamic defects and their role in the process of deformation and fracture of heterogeneous materials and structures
- Study of nonlinear effects in solids under high-velocity impact
- Study of laws governing the behavior of geological media under dynamic effects

Research Interests of S.G. Psakhie were multifaceted and covered problems of an unusually wide range. Being a material scientist, he contributed to the development of methods of discrete mechanics and tribology, discovering laws that govern processes of deformation and destruction of heterogeneous materials and nanostructures. Sergey Psakhie is known for his work on special materials for space applications, on friction welding and on the behavior of geological media under dynamic effects. In addition, he is the author of a new method of computer modeling, which is used to solve fundamental and practically important problems of materials interaction. In the last decade, the scientific interests of Sergey Psakhie were in the areas of interactions between hard and soft matter in multiphase contrasting materials, studies of characteristics and anomalies of the behavior of substances in confined matter, as well as in dusty plasma research.

S.G. Psakhie made a great contribution to the introduction of network forms of research and development in Russia. He has implemented the network format of the organization of science - integrated research plans (IRP), which allows to effectively integrate the competencies and resources of institutes, universities and companies to solve problems in areas defined by the priorities of the country's scientific and technological development. The interdepartmental project office “Perspective materials, technologies and structures” of the Federal Agency for Scientific Organizations of Russia and the State Corporation for Space Activities “Roscosmos”, the basic organizations of which are the ISPMS SB RAS and Rocket and Space Corporation Energi, was created as a pilot interdepartmental project within the framework of the Integrated Plan for Basic Research materials with a multi-level hierarchical structure for new technologies and robust structures.

== Personal life ==
Psakhie was married, having two daughters and one son. The eldest daughter Olga is a biochemist, living in California. The second daughter, Natalia, is a programmer and lives in California. The only son, Ivan, is a biochemist and works in Germany. In addition, he has four grandchildren, Sonja Vasiljeva, Pavel Vasiljev, Christine Chadnova, and Victoria Chadnova, who all reside in California. Psakhie died on 22 December 2018, aged 66.

== Bibliography ==
- Goldin S.V., Psakhie S.G., Dmitriev A.I., Yushin V.I. (2001 ), Structure rearrangement and «lifting» force phenomenon in granular soil under dynamic loading. PHYSICAL MESOMECHANICS, v.4, No3, pp. 97–103(rus)
- Ostermeyer, G.-P., Popov, V.L., Shilko, E., Vasiljeva, O. (Eds.) (2021) Multiscale Biomechanics and Tribology of Inorganic and Organic Systems. In memory of Professor Sergey Psakhie, Springer., doi: 10.1007/978-3-030-60124-9

== See also ==
- Institute of Strength Physics and Materials Science SB RAS
- Movable cellular automaton
