= Akademgorodok (Tomsk) =

Coordinates: 56.474178°N 85.049801°E

Akademgorodok In Tomsk
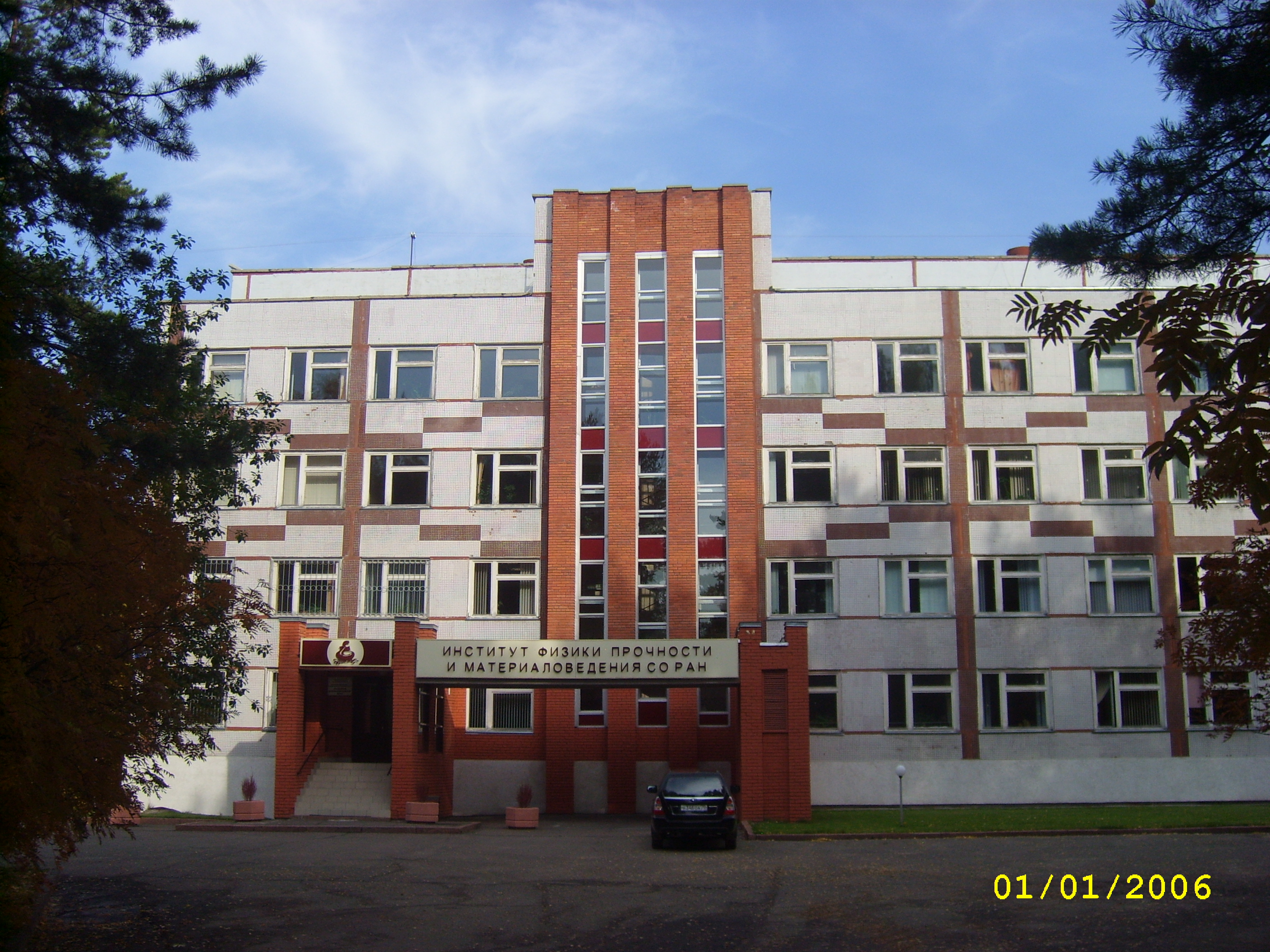
- Institute of Strength Physics and Materials Science SB RAS
- Area: 200 hectares
- Founded: 1972
- Located in: Tomsk

Coordinates
- N: 56.474178°
- E: 85.049801°

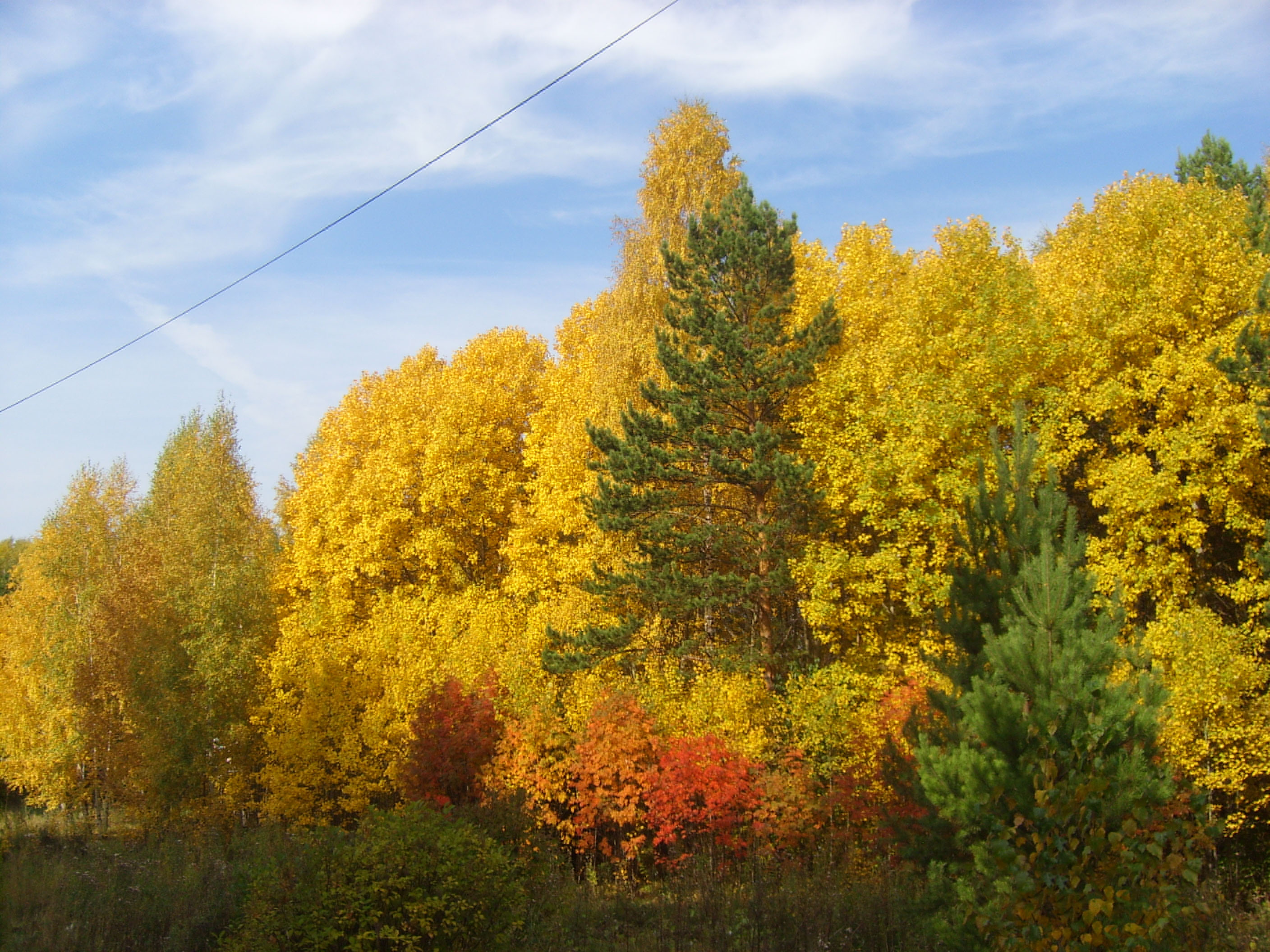
Tomsk Akademgorodok forest

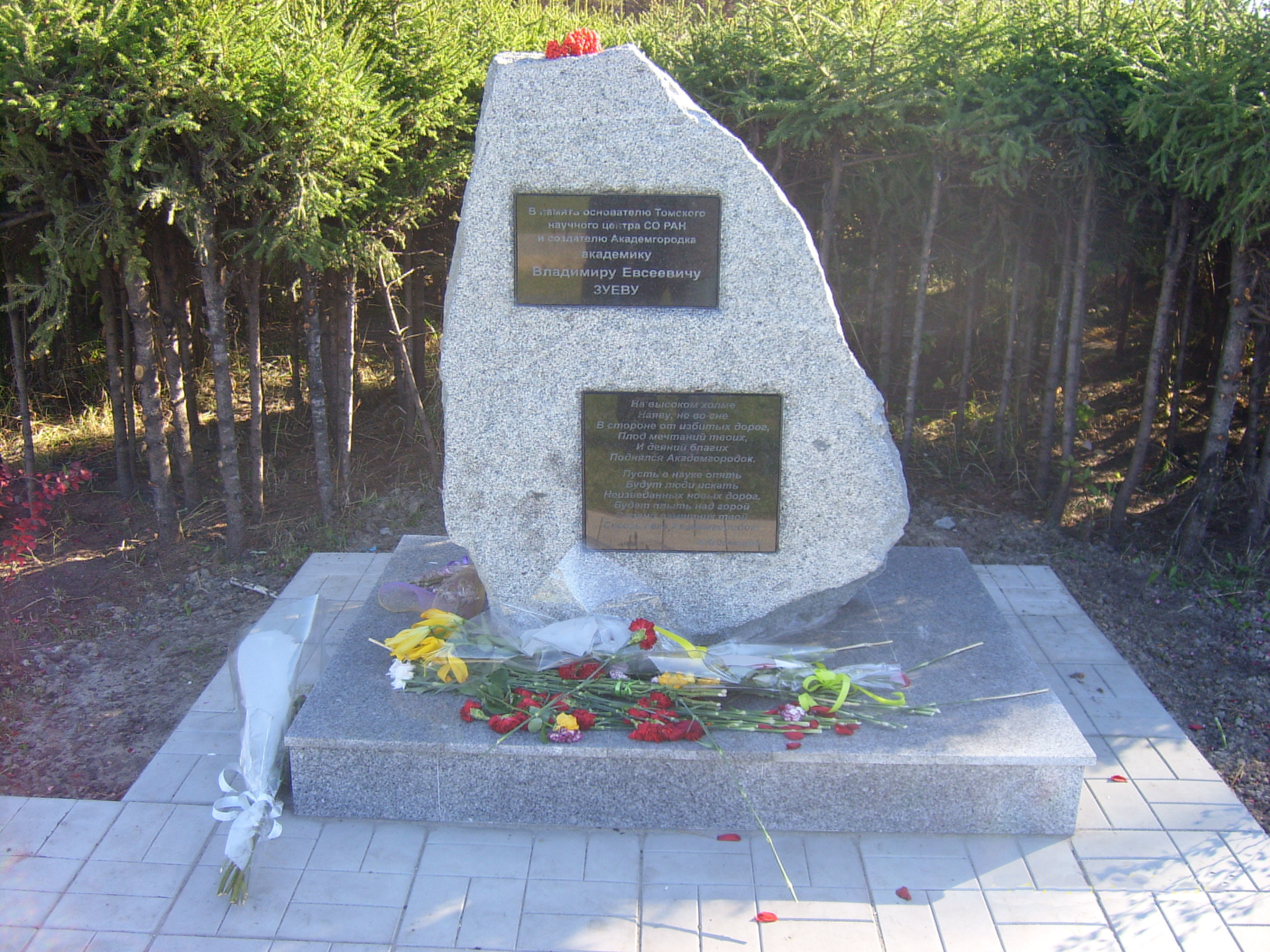
Monument to academician Vladimir Zuev that founded the Tomsk Scientific Center SB RAS and the created Akodemgorodok

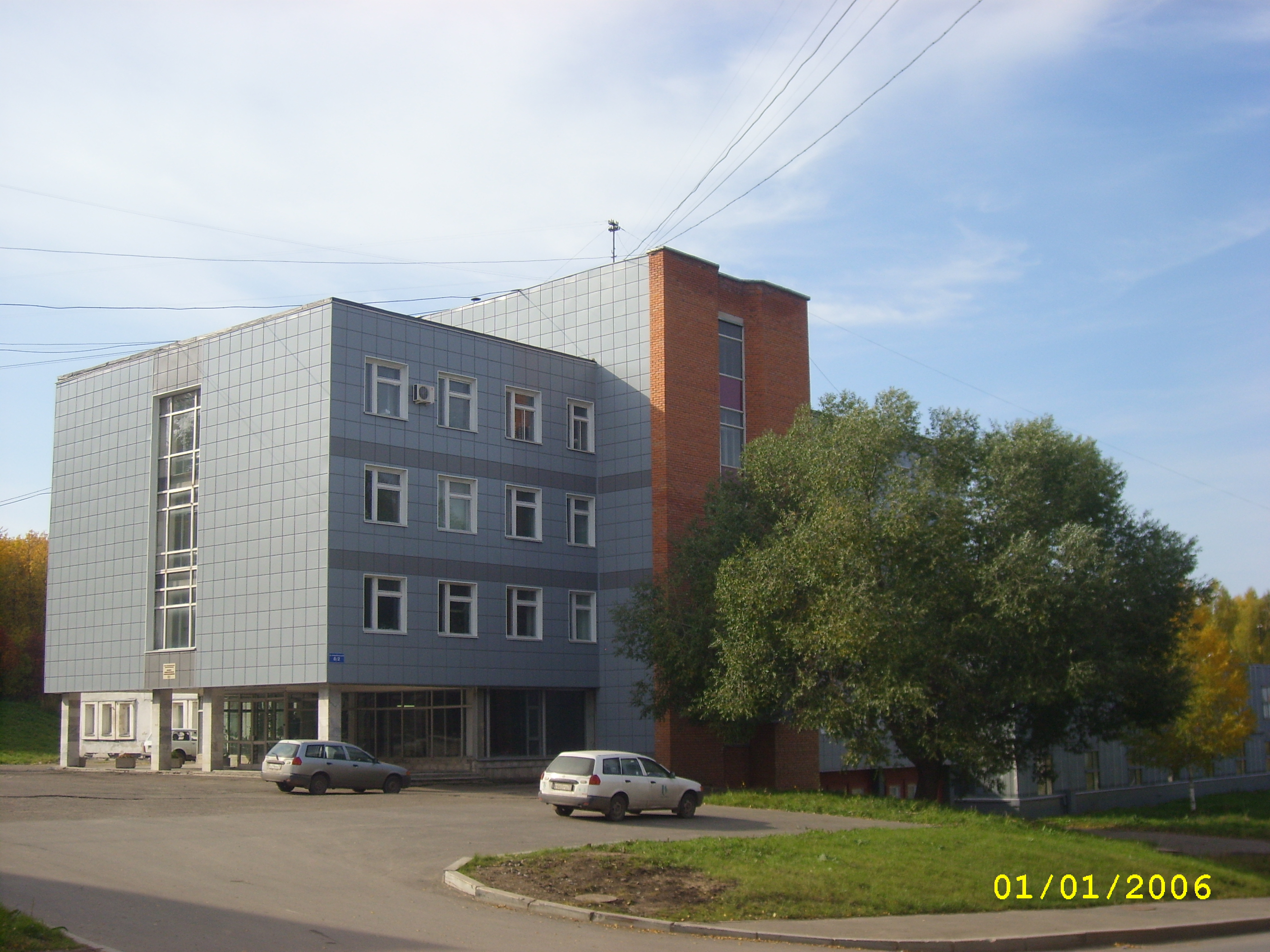
Republican Scientific-Technical Center at ISPMS SD RAS

Tomsk Akademgorodok is an educational and scientific estate in the Soviet area of Tomsk, Siberian Federal District, in which are research institutes, and have employees of the Tomsk Scientific Center of the Siberian Division of the Russian Academy of Sciences (RAS). Tomsk Akademgorodok is located in the eastern part of the Tomsk and on all sides surrounded by forests. Tomsk Akademgorodok is located on the high right bank of the river Ushaika. Its total area is 200 hectares. Construction of Tomsk Akademgorodok began in 1972. The Grand opening of the first scientific institute in Tomsk, Akademgorodok-the Institute of Atmospheric Optics, was held on January 25, 1975 .

== Organizations ==
- Institute of Petroleum Geology and Geophysics, Siberian Division of the RAS
- Institute of Petroleum Chemistry, Siberian Division of the RAS
- Institute for Monitoring Climatic and Ecological Systems, Siberian Division of the RAS
- Republican Scientific-Technical Center at the ISPMS SD RAS
- Institute of Atmospheric Optics, Siberian Division of the RAS
- High Current Electronics Institute, Siberian Division of the RAS
- Institute of Strength Physics and Materials Science SD RAS

== Streets ==
- Academic Pr
- Vavilov Street
- Korolev Street
- 30 years of Victory Street

== Transportation ==
You can get to the Academic by bus # 5, 13/14, 16, 25, 33/34, 35/53, 131.

== See also ==
- Education in Russia
- Akademgorodok
- Russian Academy of Sciences
- Education in Siberia
- Tomsk
- Naukograd
