= Murat Kamaletdinov =

Russian geologist (1928–2013)

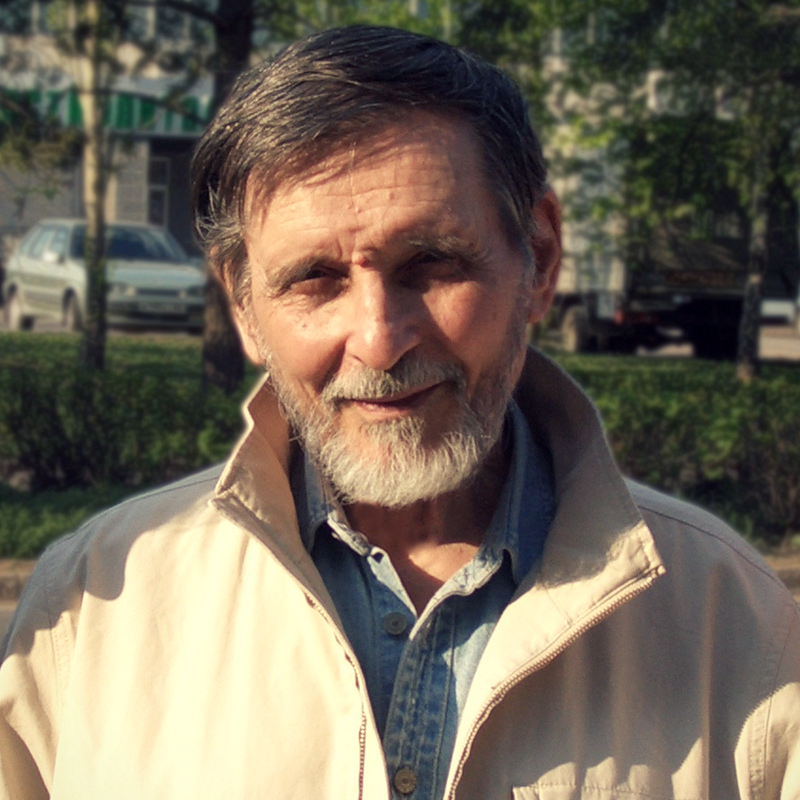
Murat Kamaletdinov

Murat Abdulkhakovich Kamaletdinov (18 July 1928 – 1 July 2013) was a Bashkir petroleum geologist.

== Early life and career ==
Born on 18 July 1928 in Tomsk, Russia, Kamaletdinov graduated from Kazan State University in 1953. He began his career as a foreman at the geological prospecting expedition office in Sterlitamak, a city in the Bashkir Autonomous Soviet Socialist Republic. He became the chief of the geological party in 1955 and then the chief geologist for the prospecting office. In 1969, he began working at the Institute of Geology of the Russian Academy of Sciences' Ural Scientific Center, first as a senior researcher and then, starting in 1974, as head of the laboratory of tectonics. From 1976 to 1991, he was the director of the Institute of Geology.

From 1974 to 1997, he conducted lectures at Bashkir State University. In the same period, he became an academician at the Academy of Sciences of the Republic of Bashkortostan, an honorary member of the Russian Academy of Natural Sciences, a member of the Tectonic Committee of the USSR, and an honored worker of science and technology of the Republic of Bashkortostan.

Kamaletdinov died on 1 July 2013 in Ufa, Russia.

== Geological research ==
In 1954, when Soviet geologists categorically denied the concept of nappes, Kamaletdinov proved the existence of the large Karatau nappe on the western slope of the Southern Ural Mountains. He went on to discover many other tectonic sheets and allochthonous outcrops in the Southern and Middle Urals that had previously been identified, incorrectly, as anticlinal folds. He also contributed to the discovery of many oil deposits in the Urals and developed an effective method for finding them.

Kamaletdinov theorized that the horizontal movements of tectonic plates played a key role in the structure and development of the Earth's crust. In 1971, he and R.A. Kamaletdinov discovered that the formation of foredeeps was associated with the isostatic dip edge of the continental platform under the weight of orogenic structures. With Yu.V. Kazantsev and T.T. Kazantseva, he analyzed the tectonics of the Urals in comparison with the Crimean Mountains, the Caucasus Mountains, the Pamir Mountains, the Himalayas, the Appalachians, the Rocky Mountains, and other orogenic zones. The results allowed him to forecast the prospects for oil and gas in undernappe zones.

With D.V. Postnikov, Kamaletdinov studied the foundations of ancient and young platforms: Eastern European, Western European, Siberian, West Siberian, North American, and African. He found that they had similar structures. Extensive data analysis revealed the existence of a genetic connection between allochthons and deposits, with nappes and thrusts creating the conditions necessary for the generation and accumulation of deposits.

These data allowed Kamaletdinov to create a global geological theory that he called nappe-thrust. According to the theory, thrusts are the major structural elements of the stone shell of Earth, and their movements cause major geological processes like orogeny, folding, sedimentation, magmatism, metamorphism, seismicity, and the formation of mineral resources like oil, gas, metal ores, and diamonds. This theory allows scientists to explain geological phenomena and processes through cause-and-effect relationships. It was a major scientific achievement of modern Russian geology, as well as the first universal theory on a global scale created by Russian geologists.

== Awards ==
In 1986, Kamaletdinov was awarded the Order of the Red Banner of Labour. He was also an honored worker of science and technology of the Republic of Bashkortostan.

== Publications ==
Kamaletdinov authored more than 400 scientific papers, including:

- "Overthrust structures of the Urals" (1974)
- "Geology and petroleum potential of the Urals" (1988, with M. Nauka)
- Kazantseva, T.T.; Kamaletdinov, M.A. (1986). "The geosynclinal development of the Urals". Tectonophysics. 127 (3–4): 371–381. doi:10.1016/0040-1951(86)90071-5.
- "Nappe-thrust tectonics of lithosphere" (1991, with M. Nauka)
- "Scientists and time" (2007)
- "Physical nature of thermal anomalies of the Yangantau Mountain, Southern Urals" (1998)

He also worked on the following books:

- Bashkortostan: Short Encyclopedia. Ufa: Bashkir Encyclopedia, 1996
- Tatar Encyclopedia. Kazan Tatar Encyclopedia Institute of the Academy of Science, 1999.
- Bashkir Encyclopedia: 7 v. V. 3: J-K. Ufa: Bashkir Encyclopedia, 2007.

== Biographical film ==
A film was made in 2011 about Kamaletdinov's life.
