= Viktor Panin (physicist) =

Soviet physicist (1930–2020)

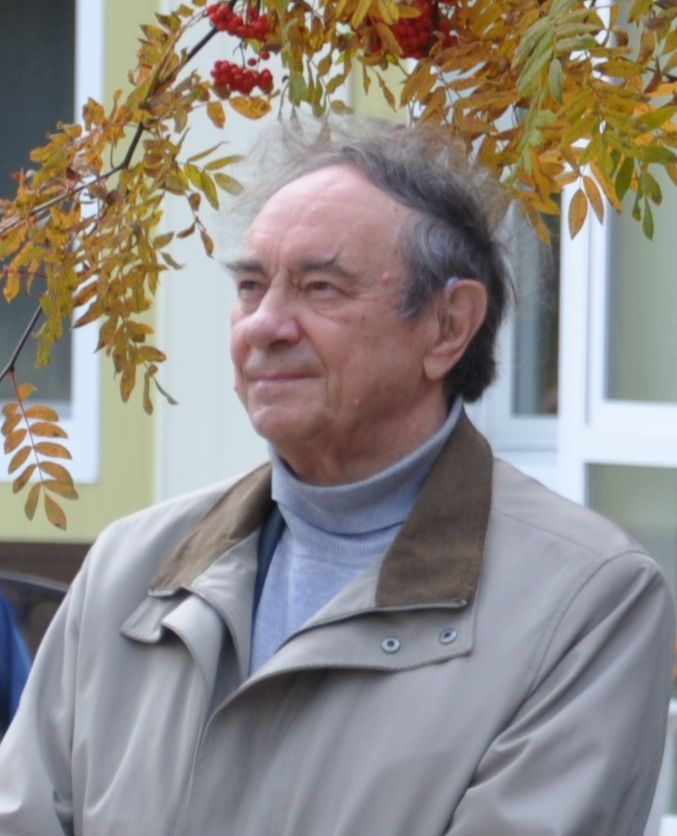
- Viktor Panin on the 25-anniversary of the institute he created (a picnic on the holiday village)
- Born: Viktor Yevgenyevich Panin; 10 November 1930; Semipalatinsk, Kazakh ASSR, RSFSR, Soviet Union
- Died: 25 September 2020 (aged 89); Tomsk, Russia
- Education: National Research Tomsk State University
- Scientific career
- Workplaces: National Research Tomsk State University, Institute of Strength Physics and Materials Science SB RAS
- Doctoral students: Sergey Psakhie

Viktor Yevgenyevich Panin (Russian: Виктор Евгеньевич Панин; 10 November 1930 – 25 September 2020) was a Soviet and Russian physicist, professor, and advisor of the Russian Academy of Sciences. He was an expert in the fields of solid mechanics, plastic deformation and physical materials.

== Curriculum vitae ==
- 1979 — Head of Solid State Physics and Materials Science at the Institute of Atmospheric Optics, Academy of Sciences of the Soviet Union
- From 1984 to 2002 — founder and director of Institute of Strength Physics and Materials Science SB RAS
- From 2002 to present — Adviser Academy of Sciences of Institute of Strength Physics and Materials Science SB RAS

He was a Foreign Member of the National Academy of Sciences of Belarus since 1999.

== Scientific achievements ==
Under the guidance of academician Viktor Panin who established and developed physical mesomechanics of materials, uniting physical materials with solid mechanics at macrolevel and with physics of plastic deformation at microlevel. Within this framework, he developed new methods of computer design materials and technologies of their production. Deep mesomechanics ideas can be successfully used in the new approach to earthquake prediction where the seismic source mesostructure appears to be an intermediate term precursor.

== See also ==
- Institute of Strength Physics and Materials Science SB RAS
