= Vladimir Zuev (physicist) =

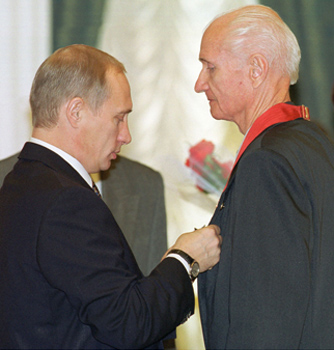
- Vladimir Putin (left) decorating Vladimir Zuev
- Born: Vladimir Yevseyevich Zuev; January 29, 1925; Irkutsk Governorate, Russian SFSR, Soviet Union
- Died: June 6, 2003 (aged 78); Tomsk, Russia
- Citizenship: Russian
- Education: National Research Tomsk State University
- Scientific career
- Fields: optics
- Institutions: Siberian Physico-Technical Institute, Institute of Atmospheric Optics SB RAS

Vladimir Yevseyevich Zuev (Russian: Владимир Евсеевич Зуев; January 29, 1925 – June 6, 2003) was a Soviet and Russian physicist, academician of the Academy of Sciences of the Soviet Union, Hero of Socialist Labour, USSR State Prize recipient, honorary citizen of Tomsk, expert in atmospheric physics and optics.

== Awards and honours ==
- Order of Lenin (January 1, 1985)
- Order of the Patriotic War, 2nd degree (March 11, 1985)
- 2 Orders of the Red Banner of Labour (January 28, 1975; May 13, 1981)
- Order of the Badge of Honour (January 14, 1967)
- Order "For Merit to the Fatherland", 2nd degree (July 4, 2000) and 3rd degree (March 10, 1995)
- USSR State Prize (1985)
- Prize of the Council of Ministers of the USSR
- Honorary citizen of the city of Tomsk (2000)

== Memory ==
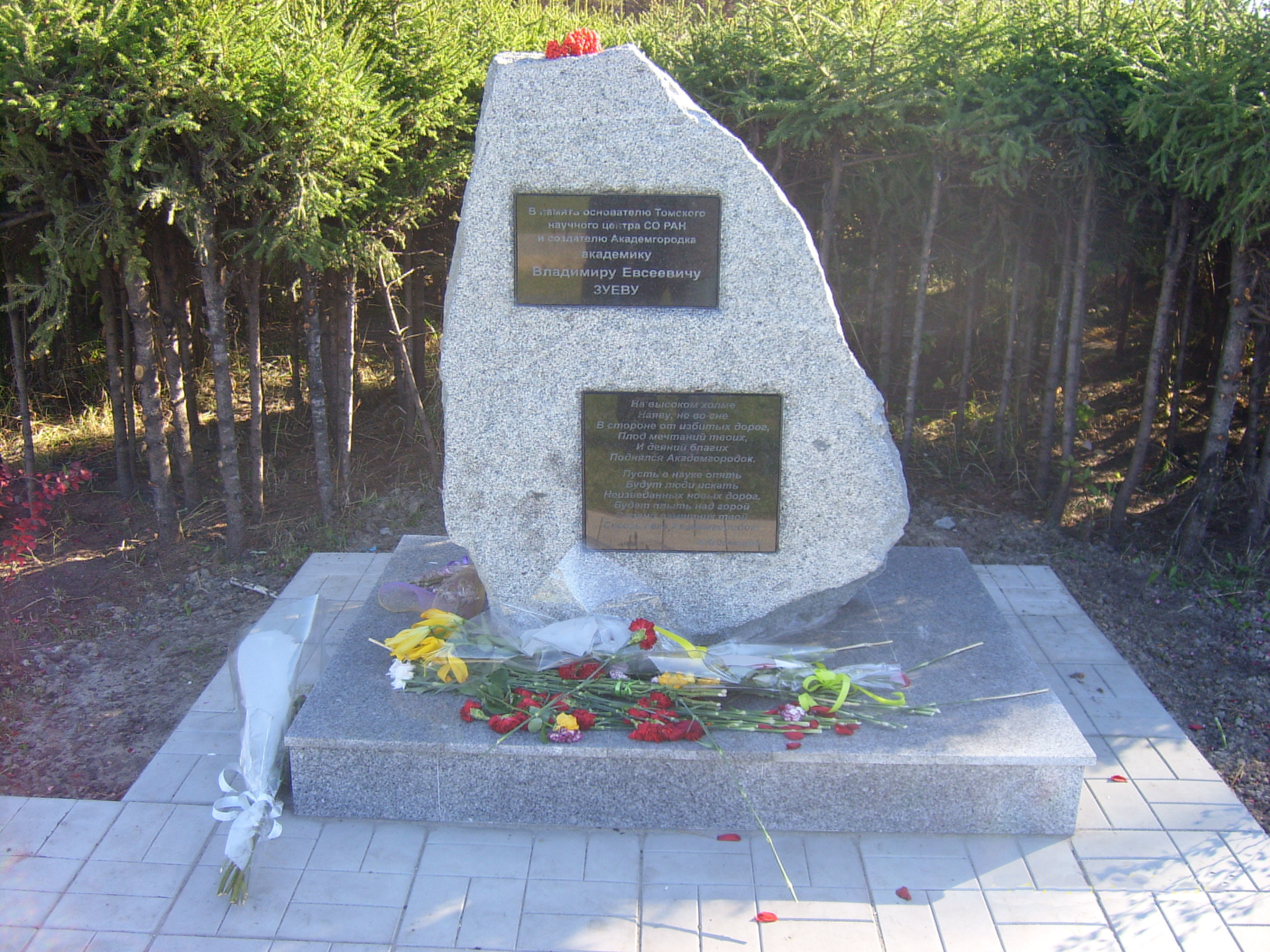
Monument to academician Vladimir Zuev that founded the Tomsk Scientific Center SB RAS and the created Akodemgorodok

- A street in Tomsk has been named after Zuev (Area "Science").
- There is a monument to academician Vladimir Zuev in Tomsk Akodemgorodok

== Publications ==
The author of 32 books and more than 600 scientific articles. The main work in the field of optics and atmospheric physics.

== See also ==
- Akademgorodok (Tomsk)
