= Institute of Strength Physics and Materials Science SB RAS =

Soviet-Russian research institute

Coordinates: 56.4765°N 85.044°E

Institute of Strength Physics and Materials Science (ISPMS) SD RAS
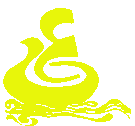
- Established: 1984
- President: Sergey Psakhie
- Address: 634021, Tomsk, Akademicheskiy str., 2/4
- Location: Tomsk, Russia
- Website: http://www.ispms.ru

Institute of Strength Physics and Materials Science of the Siberian Division of the Russian Academy of Sciences—one of the institutes of the Tomsk Research Center of the Siberian Division of the Russian Academy of Sciences. It is located in Tomsk Academic City. The Institute consists of 5 buildings with a total area of 18,487 square meters. The Institute has 15 research laboratories, the center of collective use "Nanotech", the international centre for research on physical mesomechanics, materials, the Interdisciplinary Science and Technology Center "Welding", the Testing Laboratory "Metal-Test", and 2 scientific and technological departments.

== History ==
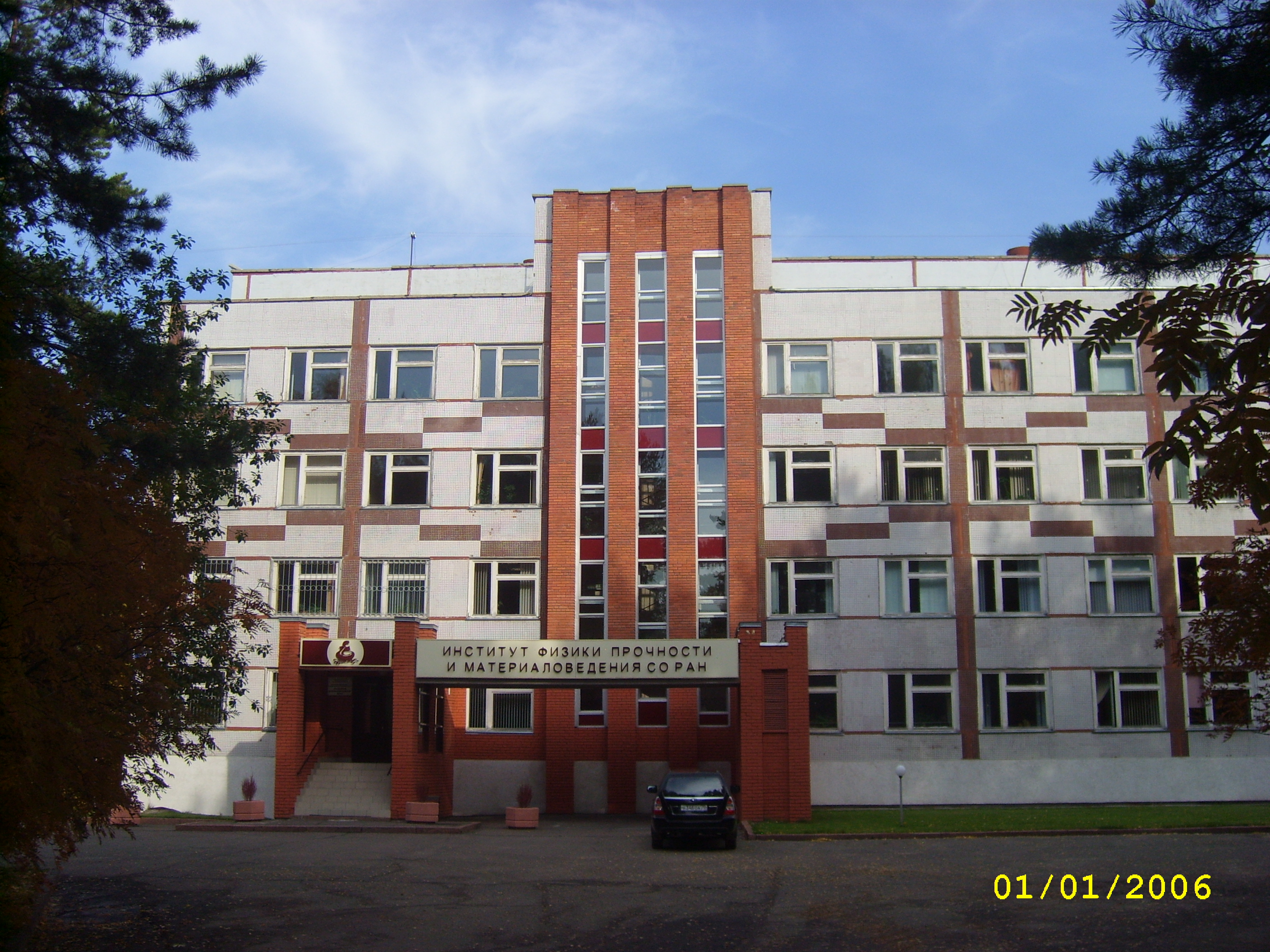
Main building #1 ISPMS SB RAS

- 1979 – Department of Solid State Physics and Materials under the leadership of Viktor Panin at the Institute of Atmospheric Optics, SD of the Academy of Sciences of the USSR
- 1984 – Is released Institute of Strength Physics and Material Sciences of the SB USSR from the Institute of Atmospheric Optics.
- 1985 – Is created the Republican Engineering Technical Center (RETC) at IMPA of the SB USSR
- 1991 – Is established Russian Material Center based on the ISPMS SB RAS
- 1994 to 1997 – Institute had the status of the State Scientific Center of Russian Federation
- 1998 – the Institute began to publish an international scientific journal "Russian: Физическая мезомеханика" in Russian and "Physical Mesomechanics" in English.
- 2007 – English version of the journal Physical Mesomechanics published by international publisher Elsevier

== Activities undertaken at the Institute ==
- In 2009. the Institute celebrated the 25th anniversary. In this connection, on September 7–9, 2009, it held an international conference on physical mesomechanics, computer design and development of new materials. Opening the conference was at the Congress Center "Ruby".

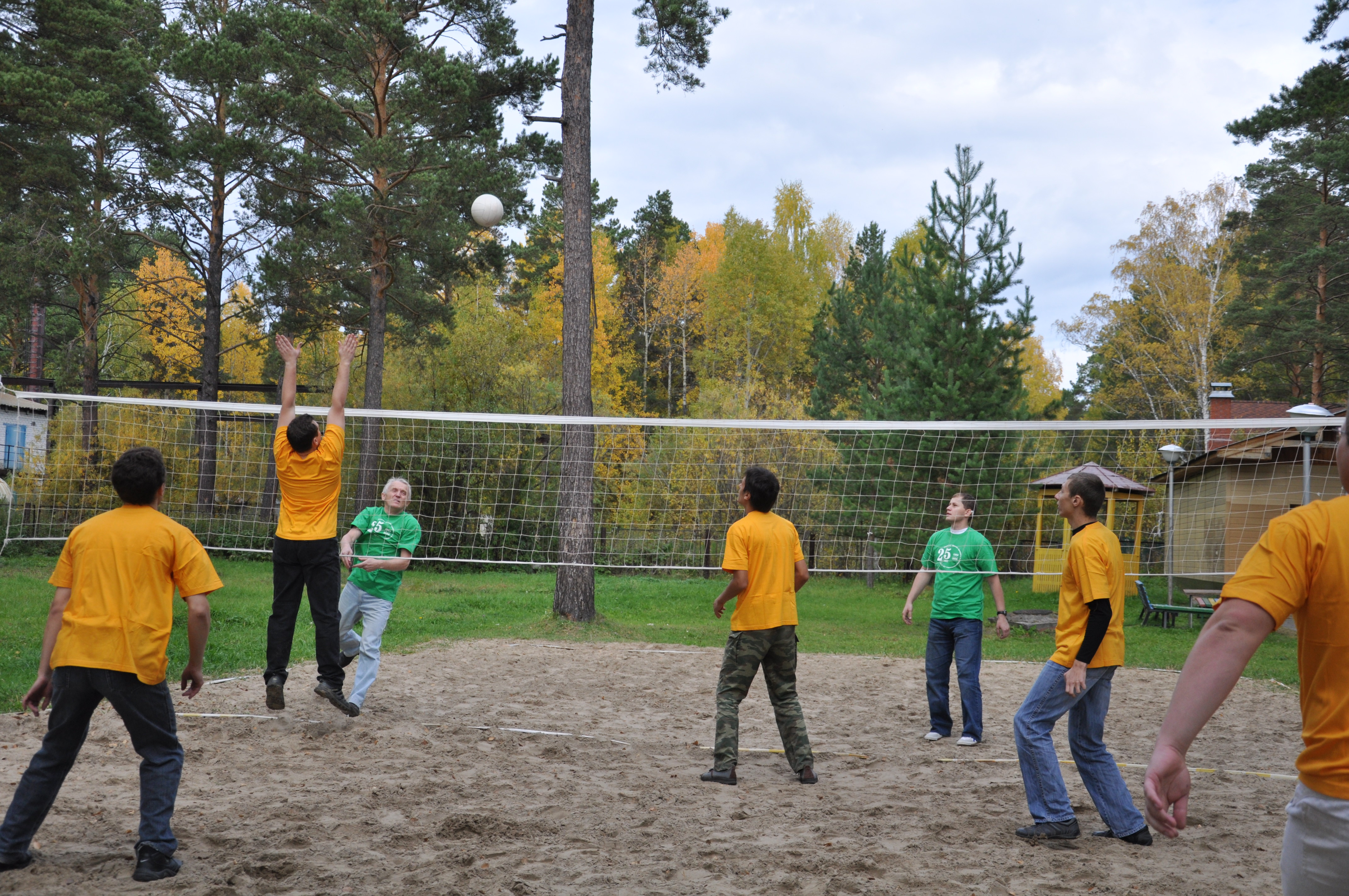
Green form—Laboratory of computer designing materials, yellow form — Laboratory of Physics of nanostructured ceramic materials

== Institute staff ==
The Institute has 420 employees (146 researchers, including 1 academician of the Academy of Sciences, 44 PhD (doctors of science) and 90 PhD (candidates of science), the number of graduate students in 10 specialties — 40.

== Directorate ==
- Director — Sergey Psakhie, DSc (doctor of science) in physics and mathematics, Professor.
- Adviser of the Russian Academy of Sciences—Viktor Panin, DSc in physics and mathematics, Professor, Full Member of the Russian Academy of Sciences.
- Deputy Director for Science
  - Lev Zuev, DSc in physics and mathematics, Professor.
  - Lotkov Alexander, DSc in physics and mathematics, Professor.

== Structure ==
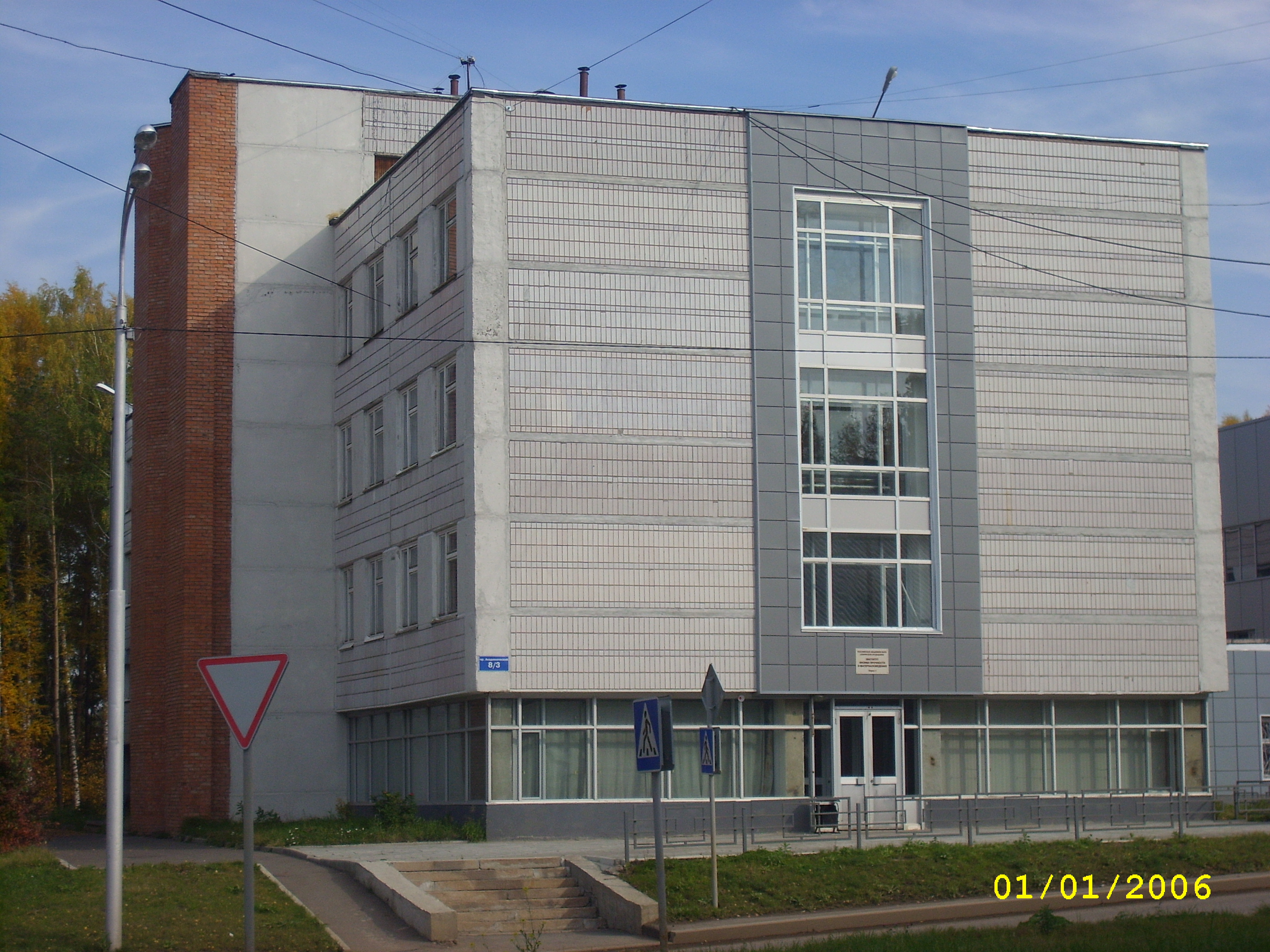
Building #2 ISPMS SB RAS

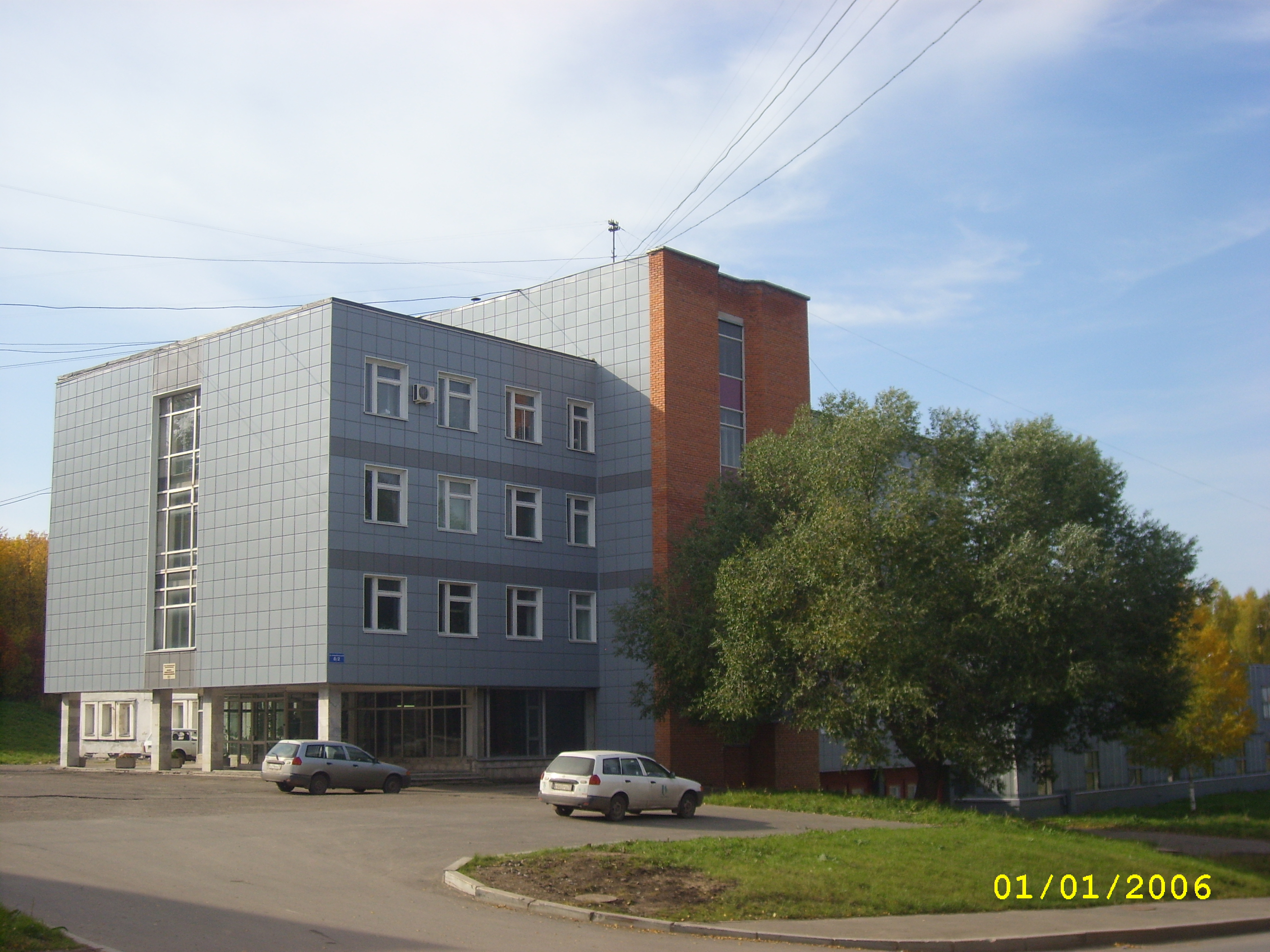
Republican Engineering Technical Center (RETC) Buildings #4 и #5 ISPMS SB RAS

- Laboratory of Physical mesomechanics and non-destructive methods of control
- Laboratory of Mechanics of heterogeneous media
- Laboratory of Materials science of shape memory alloys
- Laboratory of Physics of structural transformations
- Laboratory of Physics of Strength
- Laboratory of Physics of surface hardening
- Laboratory of Physical materials
- Laboratory of Physics of nanostructured biocomposites
- Laboratory of Computer design of materials
- Laboratory of Physics of nanostructured ceramic materials
- Laboratory of Physics of nonlinear media
- Laboratory of Physics of surface phenomena
- Laboratory of Composite materials
- Laboratory of Polymer composite materials
- Laboratory of Physical chemistry of powder materials
- Laboratory of Materials science and nanotechnology coatings
- Laboratory of Methods for coating
- Laboratory of Physical chemistry of finely
- International Centre for Research on Physical mesomechanics materials
- Interdisciplinary Science and Technology Center "Welding"

== See also ==
- Akademgorodok (Tomsk)
- Tomsk
- Education in Siberia
