= Vladimir Zuev =

Vladimir Zuev may refer to:

- Vladimir Zuev (physicist) (1925-2003), Russian physicist
- Vladimir Zuyev (sailor) (born 1961), Belarusian sailor
- Vladimir Zuev (figure skater) (born 1985), Ukrainian ice dancer
- Vladimir Zuev (architect), Ukrainian architect and designer
- Vladimir Zuev (graphics artist), Russian graphics artist
