= Nikolai Zuyev =

Nikolai Zuyev may refer to:

- Nikolai Zuyev (badminton) (born 1970), Russian badminton player
- Nikolai Zouev (1958–2022), Russian mixed martial arts fighter active in the Fighting Network Rings
