= Aleksandr Zuyev =

Aleksandr Zuyev may refer to:

- Aleksandr Zuyev (pilot) (1961–2001), Soviet and American pilot
- Aleksandr Zuyev (footballer) (born 1996), Kazakhstani football player
- Alexander Zuev (basketball) (born 1996), Russian basketball player
