= Anastasia Zuyeva =

Anastasia Zuyeva may refer to:

- Anastasia Zuyeva (swimmer) (born 1990), Russian swimmer
- Anastasia Zuyeva (actress) (1896–1986), Russian actress
