= Tomsk =

City in Russia, administrative center of Tomsk Oblast

Tomsk Томск
- City Under Oblast Jurisdiction
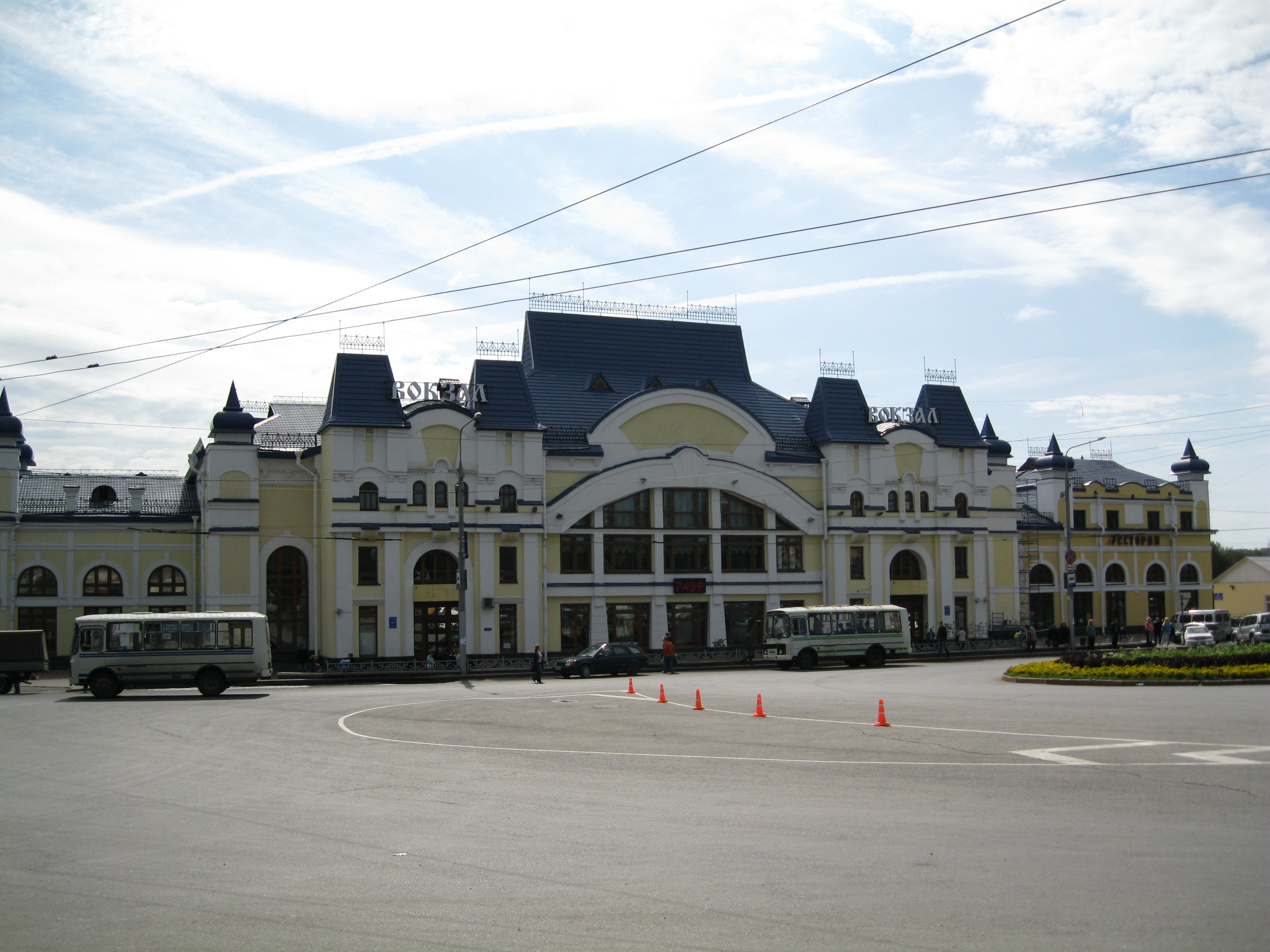
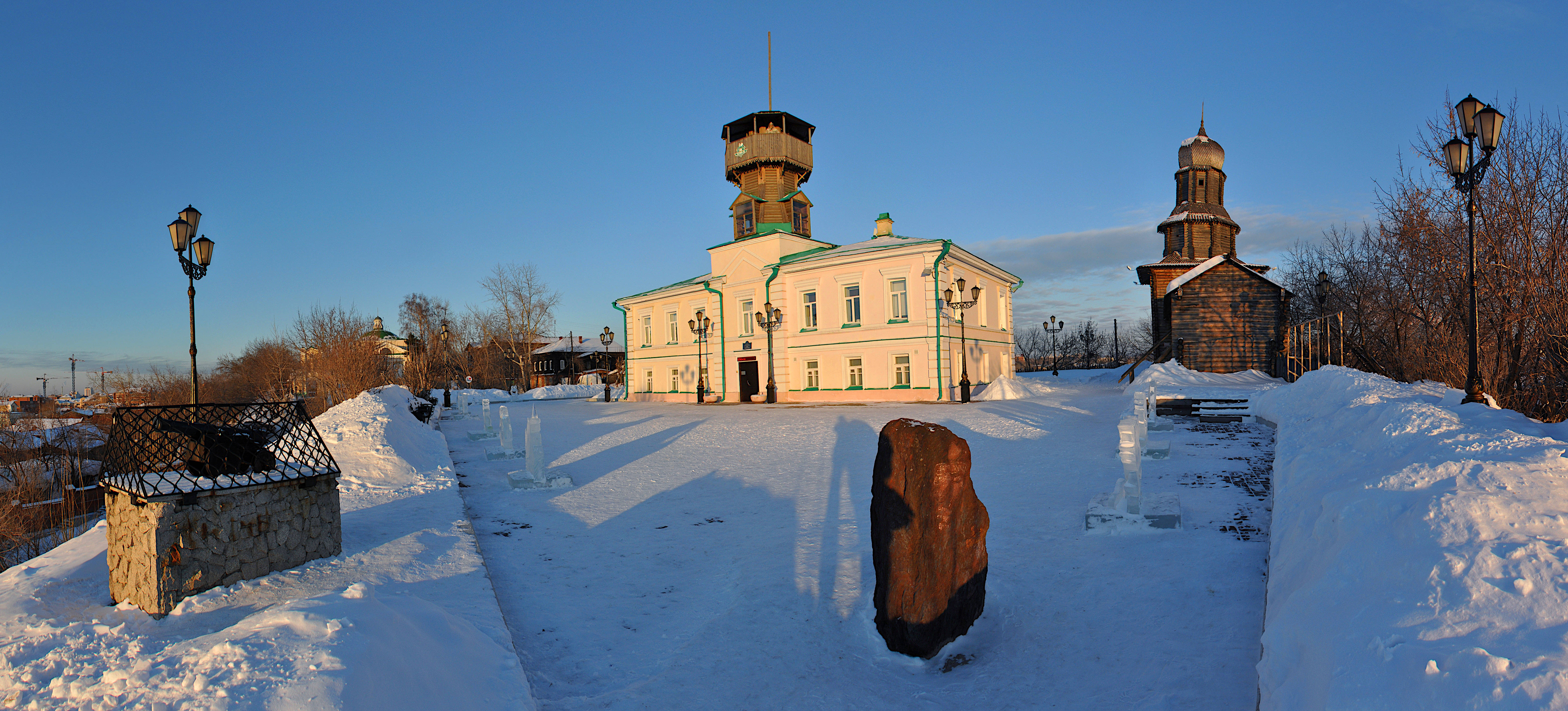
- Novo-Sobornaya Square Tomsk-1 railway station Tomsk City Hall Tomsk State University Epiphany Cathedral Tomsk fortress

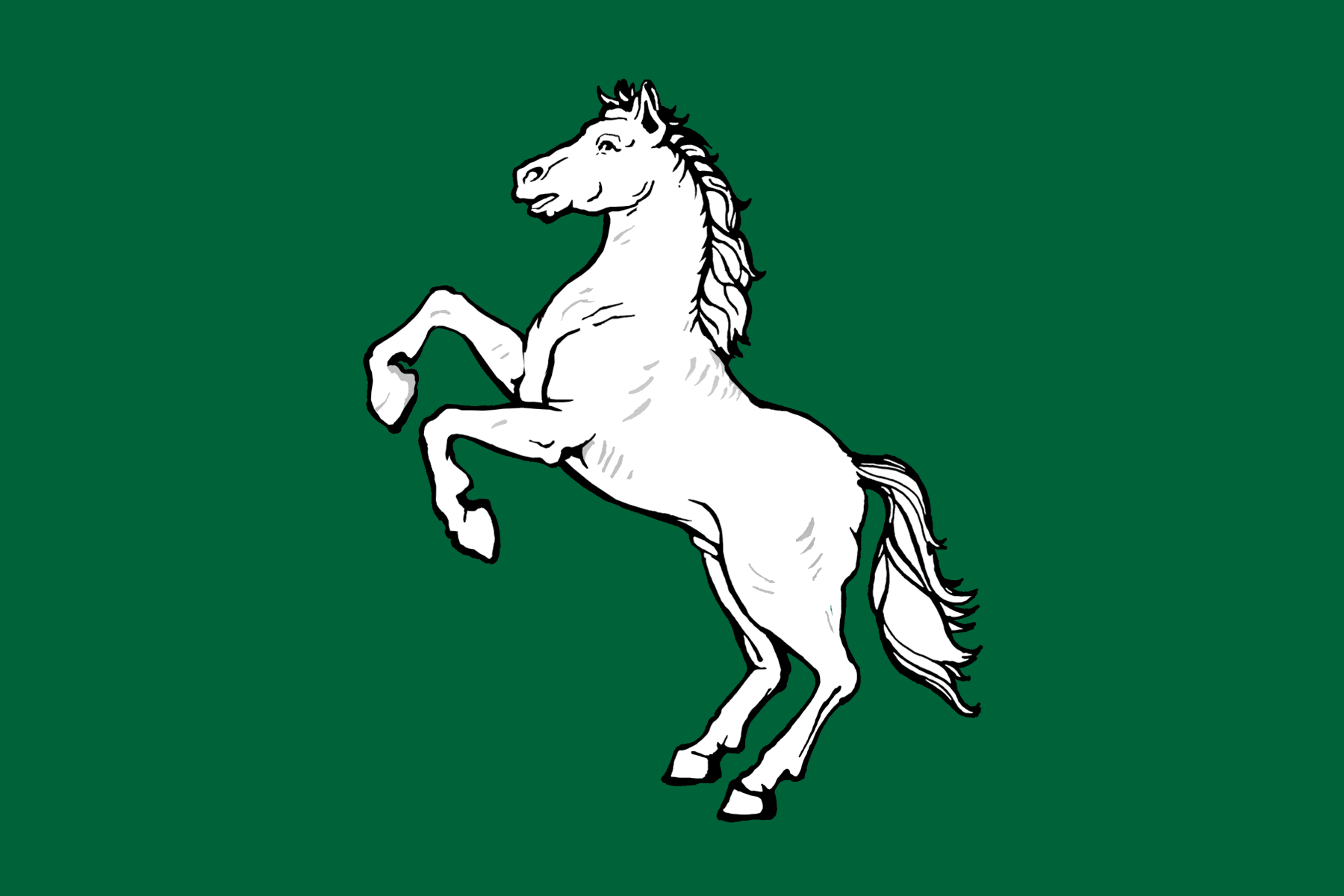
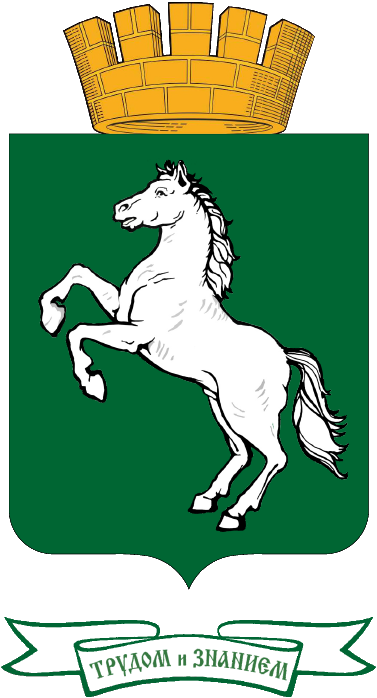
- Flag Coat of arms
- Interactive map of Tomsk
- Location of Tomsk Tomsk (Tomsk Oblast)
- Coordinates: 56°30′N 84°58′E
- Country: Russia
- Federal subject: Tomsk Oblast
- Founded: 1604

Government
  - Body: Duma
  - Mayor: Dmitry Makhinya

Area
  - Total: 294.6 km^{2} (113.7 sq mi)
- Elevation: 80 m (260 ft)

Population (2021 Census)
  - Total: 556,478
  - Estimate (2025): 544,566 (−2.1%)
  - Rank: 29th in 2021
  - Density: 1,889/km^{2} (4,892/sq mi)

Administrative status
  - Subordinated to: Tomsk City Under Oblast Jurisdiction
  - Capital of: Tomsk Oblast, Tomsky District

Municipal status
  - Urban okrug: Tomsk Urban Okrug
  - Capital of: Tomsk Urban Okrug, Tomsky Municipal District
- Time zone: UTC+7 (MSK+4)
- Postal code: 634xxx
- Dialing code: +7 3822
- OKTMO ID: 69701000001
- City Day: June 7
- Website: www.admin.tomsk.ru

Tomsk (Note: Russian: Томск, IPA: [tomsk]) is a city and the administrative center of Tomsk Oblast in Russia, on the Tom River. Population: 543,742 (2026); 556,478 (2021 census); 524,669 (2010 census); 487,838 (2002 census); 501,963 (1989 Soviet census).

Founded in 1604, Tomsk is one of the oldest cities in Siberia. It has six universities, with over 100,000 students, including Tomsk State University, the oldest university in Siberia.

== Etymology ==
The city is named after the Tom River, whose name may derive either from the Ket word toom ("river"), from the Russian word tyomny ("dark"), or from the Turco-Mongol word tom (great, major).

== History ==
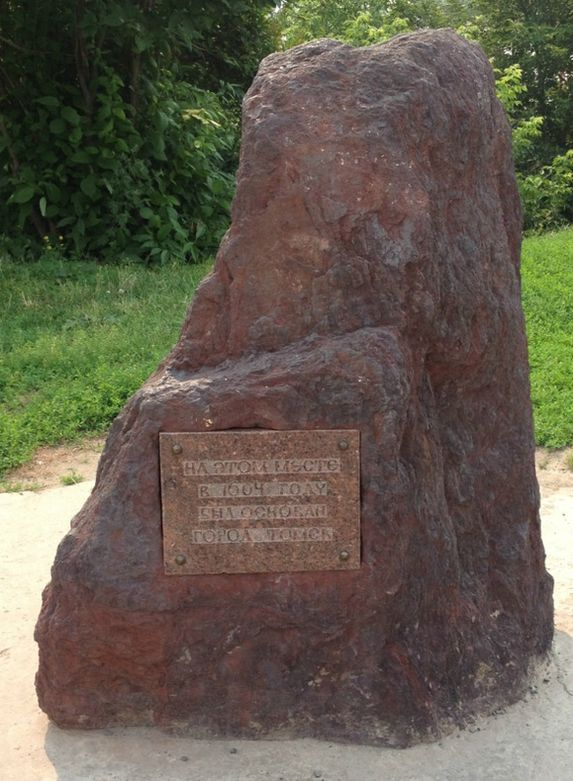
The "Where Tomsk was Founded" marker at the Tomsk History Museum.

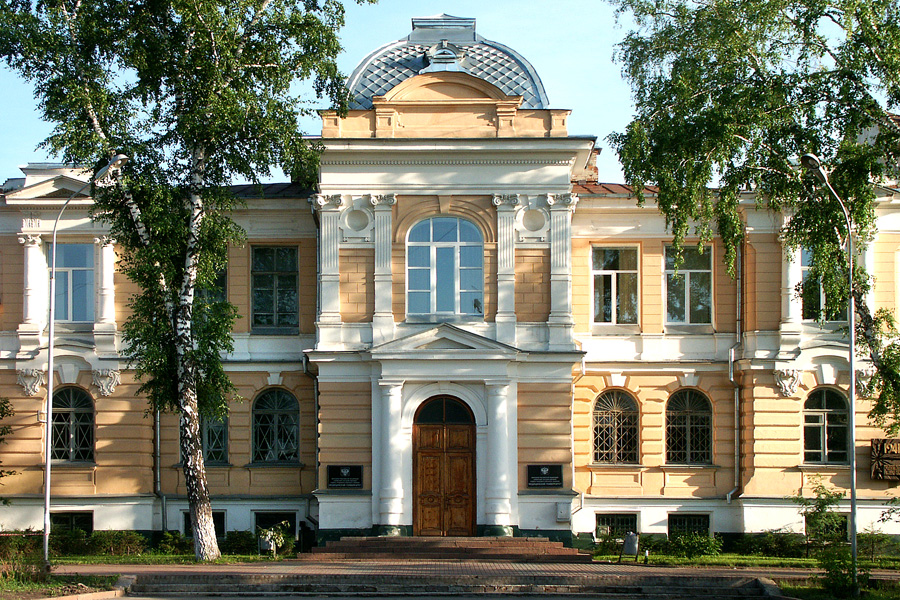
Siberian State Medical University

Tomsk originated with a decree by Tsar Boris Godunov in 1604 after Toian, the Tatar duke of Eushta Tatars, asked for the Tsar's protection against Yenisei Kyrgyz and Oirats. The Tsar sent 200 Cossacks under the command of Vasily Fomich Tyrkov and Gavriil Ivanovich Pisemsky to construct a fortress on the bank of the Tom River, overlooking what would become the city of Tomsk. Toian ceded the land for the fortress to the Tsar.

In 1804, the Imperial Russian government selected Tomsk as the seat of the new Tomsk Governorate, which would include the modern cities of Novosibirsk, Kemerovo, and Krasnoyarsk, as well as the territories now in Eastern Kazakhstan. The new status brought development and the city grew quickly.

The discovery of gold in 1830 brought further development to Tomsk in the 19th century; however, when in the 1890s the Trans-Siberian Railway bypassed the city in favor of the village of Novonikolayevsk (Novosibirsk), development began to move south to connect with the railway. In time, Novosibirsk would surpass Tomsk in importance.

In the mid-19th century one fifth of the city's residents were exiles. However, within a few years, the city reinvented itself as the educational center of Siberia with the establishment of Tomsk State University, founded in 1880, and Tomsk Polytechnic University, founded in 1896. By World War II, every twelfth resident of the city was a student, giving rise to the city's nickname, the Siberian Athens.

After the October Revolution of 1917, the city became a notable center of the White movement, led by Anatoly Pepelyayev and Maria Bochkareva, among others. After the victory of the Red Army in the 1920s, Soviet authorities incorporated Tomsk into the West Siberian Krai and later into Novosibirsk Oblast.

Like many Siberian cities, Tomsk became the new home for many factories relocated out of the war zone from 1941. The resulting growth of the city led the Soviet government to establish the new Tomsk Oblast, with Tomsk serving as the administrative center.

During the Cold War, Tomsk became one of many designated closed cities, which outsiders and, in particular, foreigners, could not visit. In 1949 matters went a stage further with the establishment of a secret city, known as "Tomsk-7" (or sometimes simply as "Postbox 5") 15 kilometres (9 miles) north-west of Tomsk; the new settlement became the home of the Tomsk Nuclear Plant (subsequently renamed the Sibirskaya Nuclear Power Plant), the Soviet Union's first industrial-scale nuclear-power station. Tomsk-7 received municipal status in 1956 and was renamed Seversk in 1992.

== Administrative and municipal status ==
Tomsk serves as the administrative center of the oblast and, within the framework of administrative divisions, it also serves as the administrative center of Tomsky District, even though it is not a part of it. As an administrative division, it is, together with seven rural localities, incorporated separately as Tomsk City Under Oblast Jurisdiction—an administrative unit with the status equal to that of the districts. As a municipal division, Tomsk City Under Oblast Jurisdiction is incorporated as Tomsk Urban Okrug.

=== City divisions ===
Tomsk is divided into four city districts: Kirovsky, Leninsky, Oktyabrsky, and Sovetsky.

== Geography ==
=== Climate ===
Tomsk has a humid continental climate (Köppen climate classification Dfb) barely escaping a subarctic classification. The annual average temperature is +1.2 °C (34.2 °F). Winters are severe and lengthy, and the lowest recorded temperature was −55 °C (−67 °F) in January 1931. However, the average temperature in January is between −21 °C (−6 °F) and −13 °C (9 °F). Summers are somewhat short and quite warm; the average temperature in July is +18.8 °C (65.8 °F). The total annual rainfall is 587 millimeters (23.1 in). In 2006, Tomsk experienced what might have been its first recorded winds of hurricane force, which toppled trees and damaged houses.

Climate data for Tomsk (1991–2020, extremes 1837–present)
Month	Jan	Feb	Mar	Apr	May	Jun	Jul	Aug	Sep	Oct	Nov	Dec	Year
Record high °C (°F)	3.7 (38.7)	7.5 (45.5)	17.7 (63.9)	30.1 (86.2)	34.4 (93.9)	35.6 (96.1)	35.6 (96.1)	33.8 (92.8)	31.7 (89.1)	25.1 (77.2)	11.6 (52.9)	6.5 (43.7)	35.6 (96.1)
Mean daily maximum °C (°F)	−13.4 (7.9)	−9 (16)	−0.4 (31.3)	8.7 (47.7)	17.5 (63.5)	23.0 (73.4)	25.0 (77.0)	21.9 (71.4)	14.7 (58.5)	6.3 (43.3)	−4.8 (23.4)	−11.1 (12.0)	6.5 (43.7)
Daily mean °C (°F)	−17.5 (0.5)	−14.2 (6.4)	−6.3 (20.7)	2.6 (36.7)	10.4 (50.7)	16.5 (61.7)	18.8 (65.8)	15.9 (60.6)	9.2 (48.6)	2.0 (35.6)	−8.2 (17.2)	−14.9 (5.2)	1.2 (34.2)
Mean daily minimum °C (°F)	−21.2 (−6.2)	−18.4 (−1.1)	−11.2 (11.8)	−2.2 (28.0)	4.9 (40.8)	11.2 (52.2)	13.8 (56.8)	11.3 (52.3)	5.2 (41.4)	−1.1 (30.0)	−11.3 (11.7)	−18.5 (−1.3)	−3.1 (26.4)
Record low °C (°F)	−55 (−67)	−51.3 (−60.3)	−42.4 (−44.3)	−31.1 (−24.0)	−17.5 (0.5)	−3.5 (25.7)	1.5 (34.7)	−1.6 (29.1)	−8.1 (17.4)	−29.1 (−20.4)	−48.3 (−54.9)	−50 (−58)	−55 (−67)
Average precipitation mm (inches)	36 (1.4)	26 (1.0)	29 (1.1)	35 (1.4)	50 (2.0)	60 (2.4)	72 (2.8)	68 (2.7)	52 (2.0)	53 (2.1)	55 (2.2)	51 (2.0)	587 (23.1)
Average extreme snow depth cm (inches)	58 (23)	68 (27)	70 (28)	30 (12)	0 (0)	0 (0)	0 (0)	0 (0)	0 (0)	2 (0.8)	15 (5.9)	41 (16)	70 (28)
Average rainy days	0.3	0.3	2	12	16	17	17	17	19	15	5	1	122
Average snowy days	23	21	17	13	4	0.3	0	0	2	14	22	26	142
Average relative humidity (%)	81	78	72	65	61	70	76	79	79	80	83	82	76
Mean monthly sunshine hours	57	104	169	224	258	314	316	253	171	86	51	41	2,044
Source 1: Pogoda.ru.net
Source 2: NOAA (sun, 1961–1990)

== Demographics ==
Historical population
Year	Pop.	±%
1897	52,221	—
1926	92,274	+76.7%
1939	145,060	+57.2%
1959	248,823	+71.5%
1970	338,389	+36.0%
1979	420,730	+24.3%
1989	501,963	+19.3%
2002	487,838	−2.8%
2010	524,669	+7.5%
2021	556,478	+6.1%
Source: Census data

== Politics ==
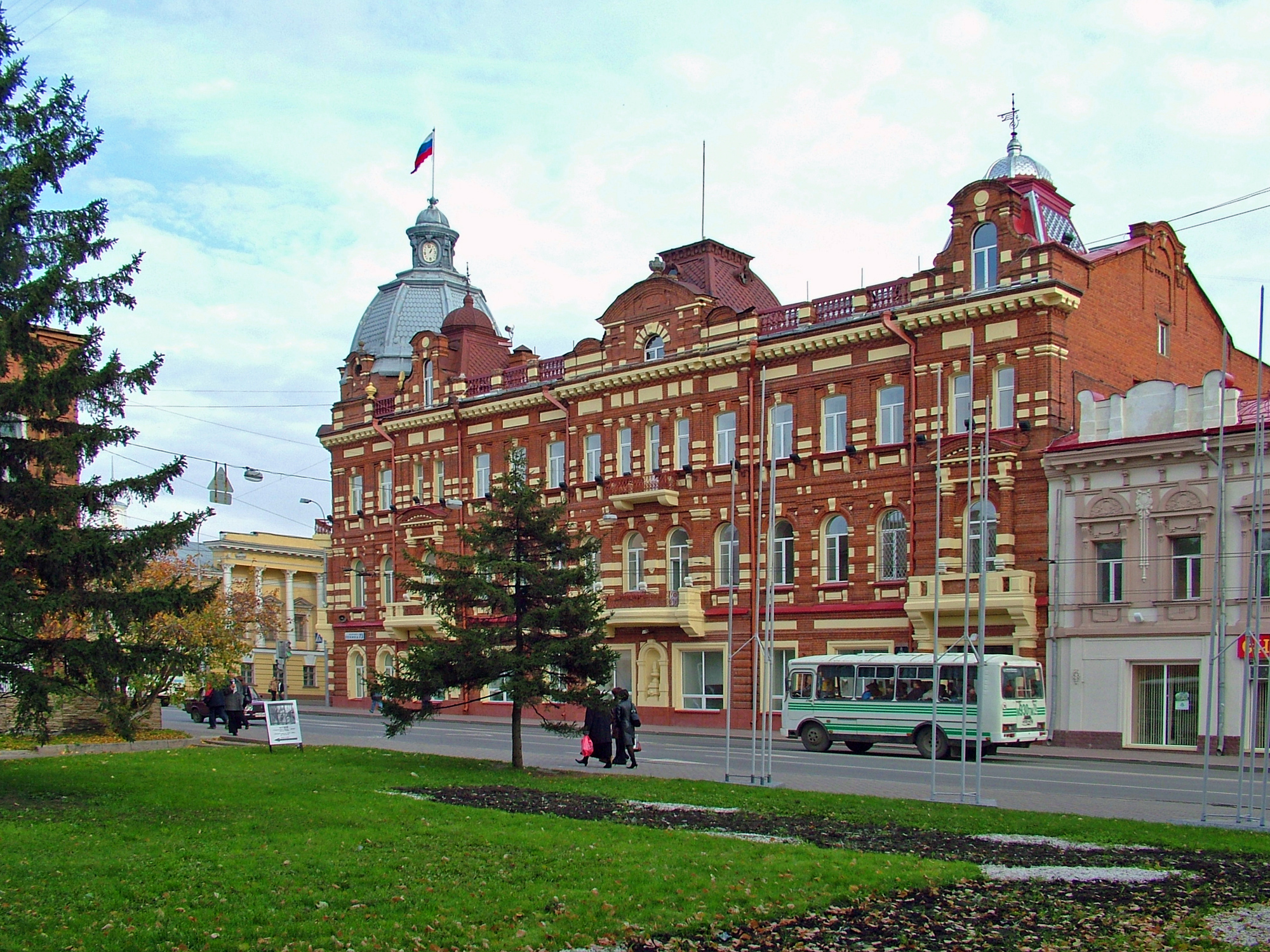
Tomsk City Administration building

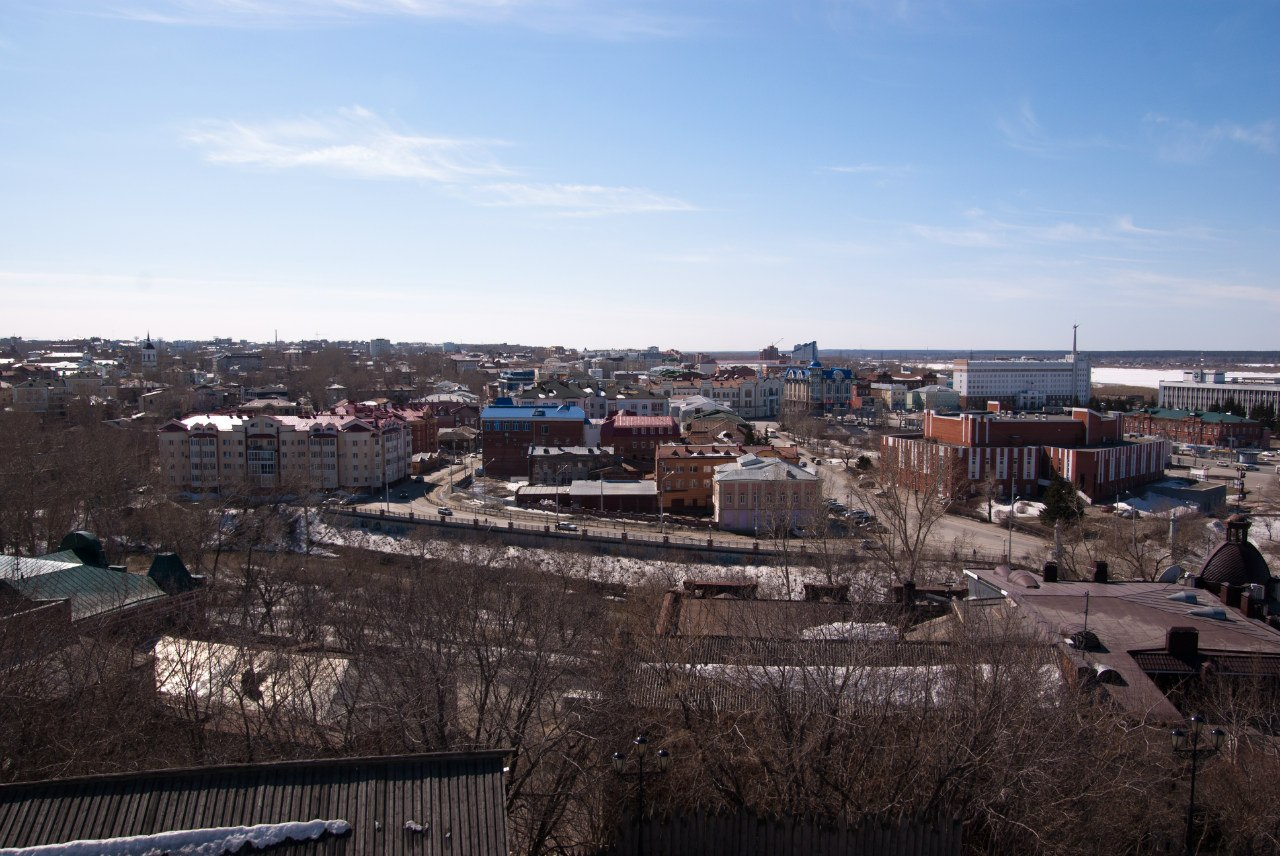
Tomsk, view from the fire-observation tower

Tomsk is governed by a mayor and a 33-member Duma. The current mayor, appointed in 2013, is Ivan Klyayn, a member of The United Russia party.

Of the 33 members, 16 are elected from the eight double mandate districts while 17 are chosen from party lists.

In the October 2005 local elections, United Russia was expected to cruise to a solid victory; however, the Pensioners Party put up a strong showing. The final count was (proportional representation):

- 19.42% — 5 seats — Pensioners Party
- 17.85% — 5 seats — United Russia
- 9.95% — 3 seats — Communist Party
- 8.57% — 2 seats — Union of Rightist Forces/Yabloko coalition
- 7.77% — 2 seats — Liberal Democratic Party of Russia
- 14.67% — Against all candidates

Double mandates

- 10 seats — No party affiliation
- 4 seats — United Russia
- 1 seat — Pensioners Party
- 1 seat — Liberal Democratic Party of Russia

=== Vote ===
In 2020, supporters of Alexei Navalny won at least 16 seats in Tomsk's 37-seat city council while the pro-Putin United Russia party secured no more than 11 seats.

== Economy ==
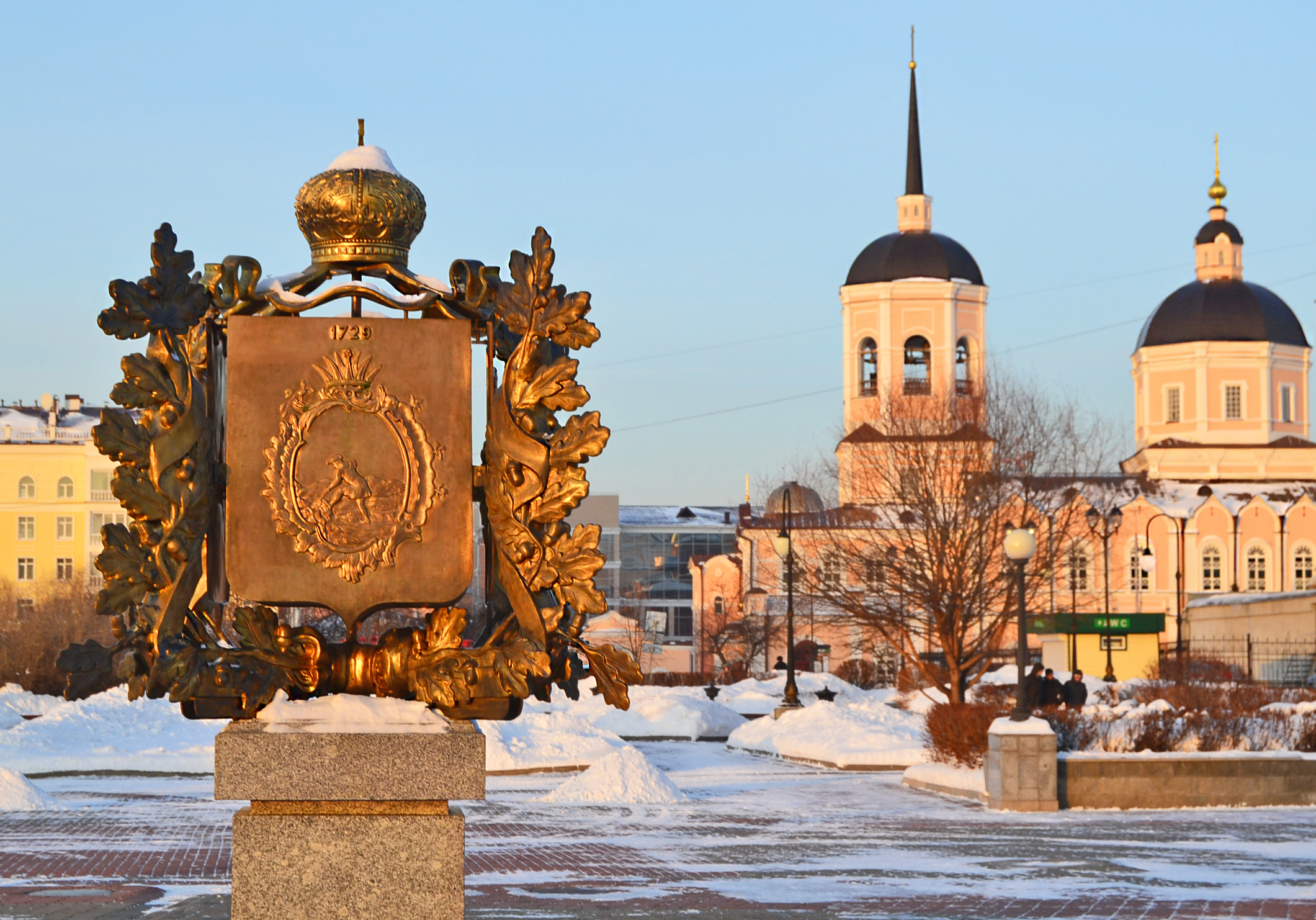
Lenin Square in Tomsk

=== Energy generation ===
Tomsk has the oldest electrical grid in Siberia. There are three power stations in the city:

1. TEC-1 (launched on January 1, 1896)
2. GRES-2 (launched on May 28, 1945)
3. TEC-3 (launched on October 29, 1988)

Tomsk consumes more electric energy than it produces. The bulk of the city's electric and thermal energy is produced by the GRES-2 (281 MWt) and TEC-3 (140 MWt) powerplants, belonging to Tomskenergo Inc. Tomsk supplements its energy needs with electricity generated at Seversk.

== Education ==
A large number of educational institutions in the city have contributed to making Tomsk a major center for Russia's IT industry. Tomsk was one of the first cities in Russia to gain access to the Internet, which became available in the early 1990s owing to grants received by universities and scientific cooperation. Tomsk has a number of prominent institutions of higher education, including:

- Tomsk Polytechnic University, founded in 1896 and opened in 1900, the oldest technical university in Siberia.
- Tomsk State University, the oldest university in Siberia (founded in 1878, opened in 1888).
- Siberian State Medical University, founded in 1930.
- Tomsk State Pedagogical University
- Tomsk State University of Architecture and Construction
- Tomsk State University of Control Systems and Radioelectronics
- Tomsk Economics and Law University
- Tomsk Institute of Business
- Institute of Petroleum Geology and Geophysics, Siberian Branch of RAS
- Institute of Petroleum Chemistry, Siberian Branch of RAS
- Institute for Monitoring Climatic and Ecological Systems, Siberian Branch of RAS
- Republican Scientific-Technical Center at ISPMS SB RAS
- Institute of Atmospheric Optics, Siberian Branch of RAS
- High Current Electronics Institute, Siberian Branch of RAS
- Institute of Strength Physics and Materials Science SB RAS
- Siberian Research Institute of Agriculture and Peat
- Tomsk National Research Medical Center, Siberian Branch of RAS

== Transportation ==
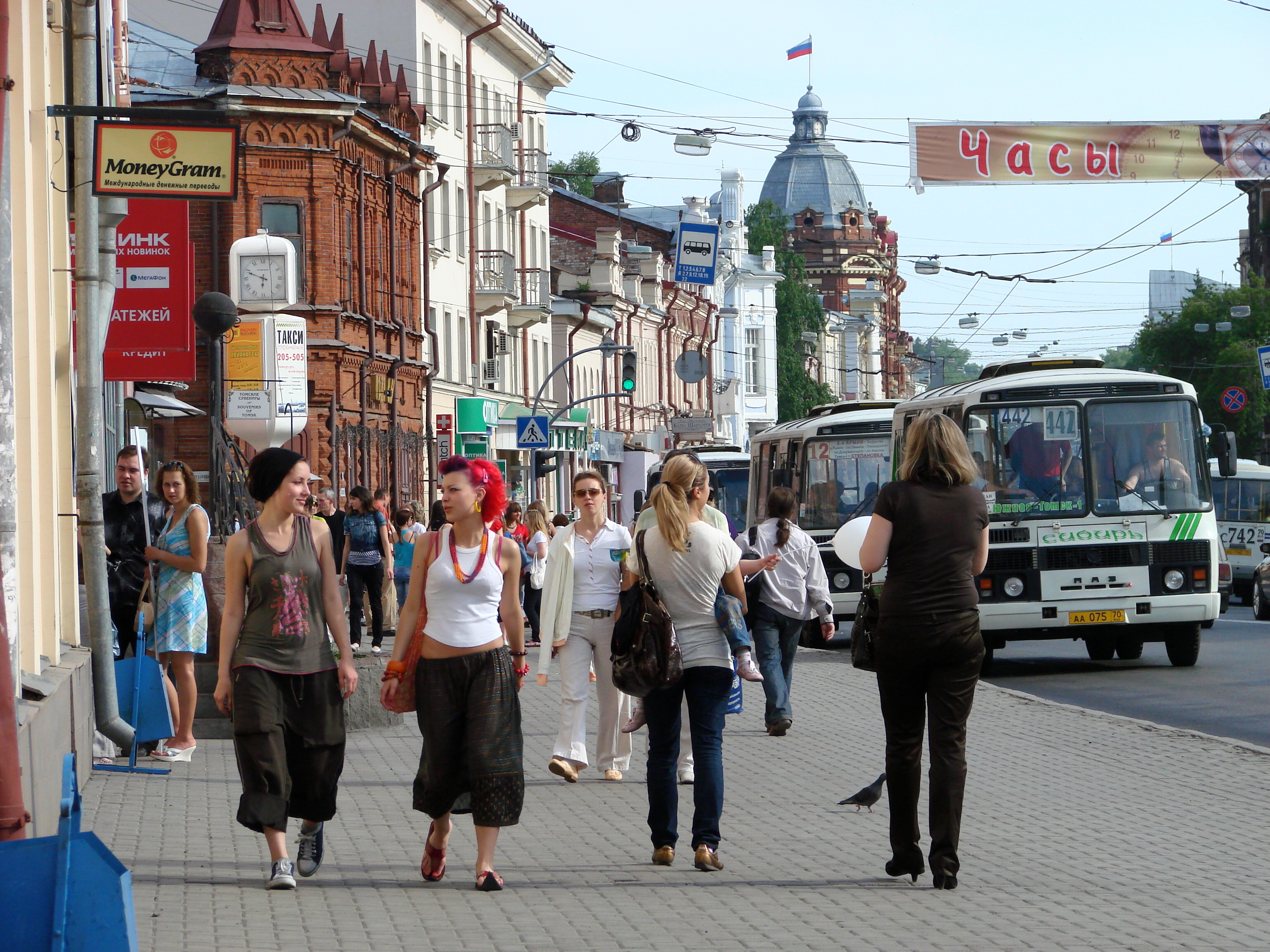
Lenina Avenue in Tomsk

=== Roads ===
- northern branch of the M53 federal road;
- road R 398 to Kolpashevo;
- road R 400 to Mariinsk;
- Northern latitude highway Perm—Surgut—Tomsk (under construction).

=== Railways ===
Tomsk is a small railway center that is situated on the Tayga—Bely Yar line (Tomsk branch) of the Trans-Siberian Railway.

The main line of the Trans-Siberian railway, built in 1896, bypasses the city 50 km (31 mi) to the south. Access from Tomsk to the Trans-Siberian railway is available via the town of Tayga. A regional rail line links Tomsk with Tayga.

The Tomsk Railway existed as an independent entity until 1961. At the present time, the Tomsk line belongs to the West-Siberian Railway, branch of Russian Railways Corp. Trains link Tomsk to Anapa, Asino, Barnaul, Bely Yar, Moscow, Novokuznetsk, Novosibirsk, Sochi, and Tayga.

=== Public transportation ===
The majority of inner-city and suburban transportation is provided by marshrutkas (routed taxis) and minibuses (mostly manufactured by PAZ, and serving about forty routes).

Additionally, the city has eleven proper bus routes, eight trolleybus lines (built in 1967), and five tram lines (constructed in 1949). Private taxis are also readily available.

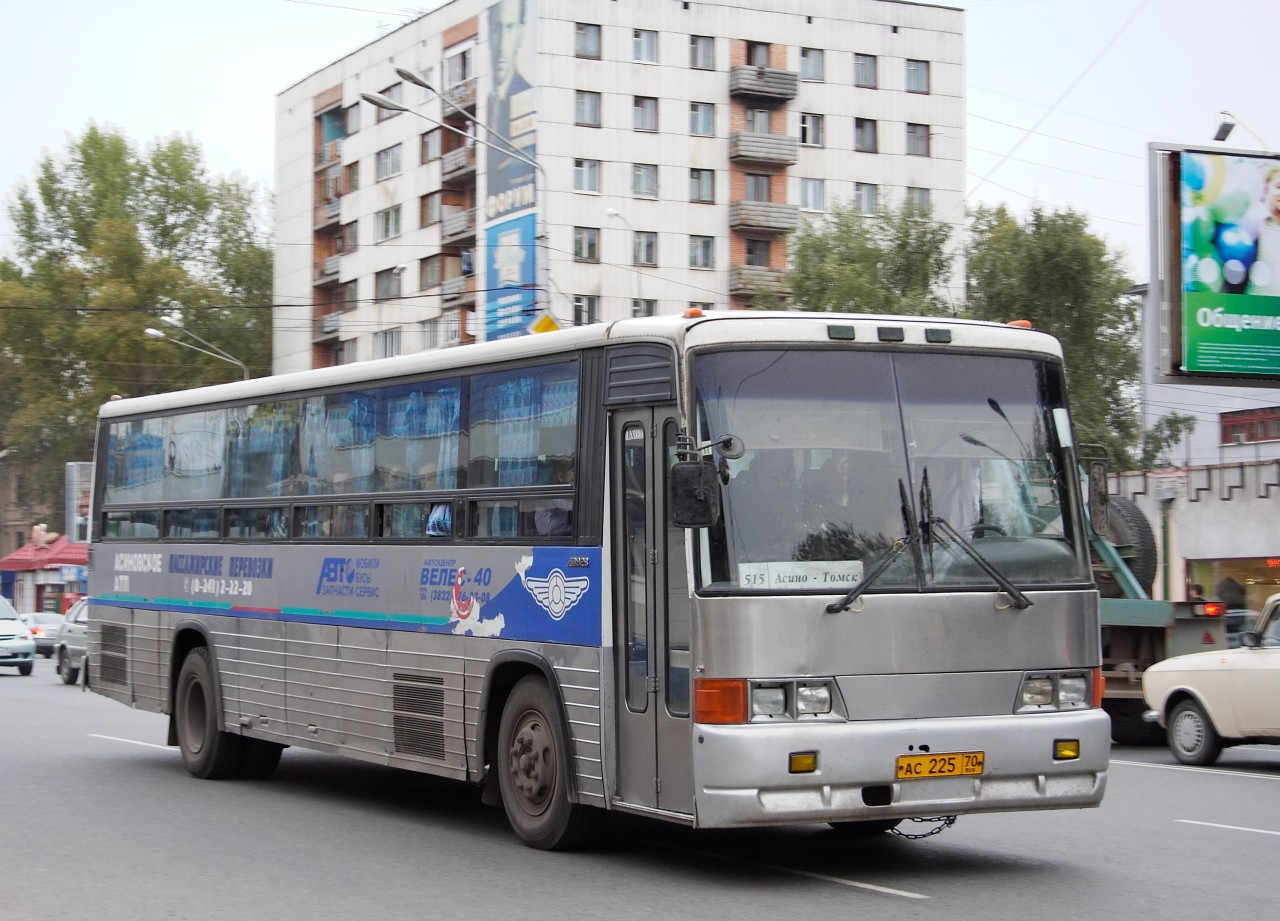
Asia AM928

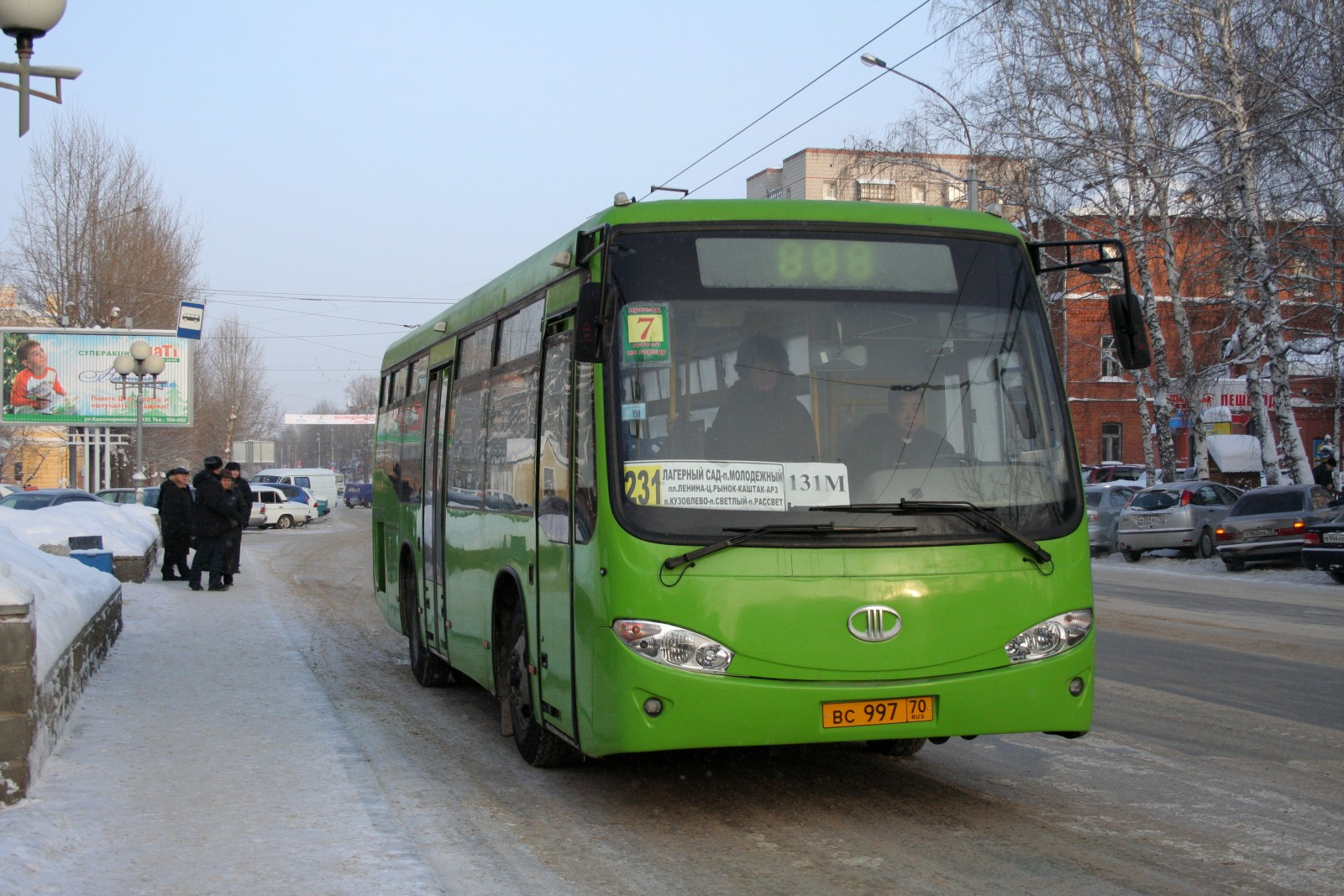
Mudan MD6106

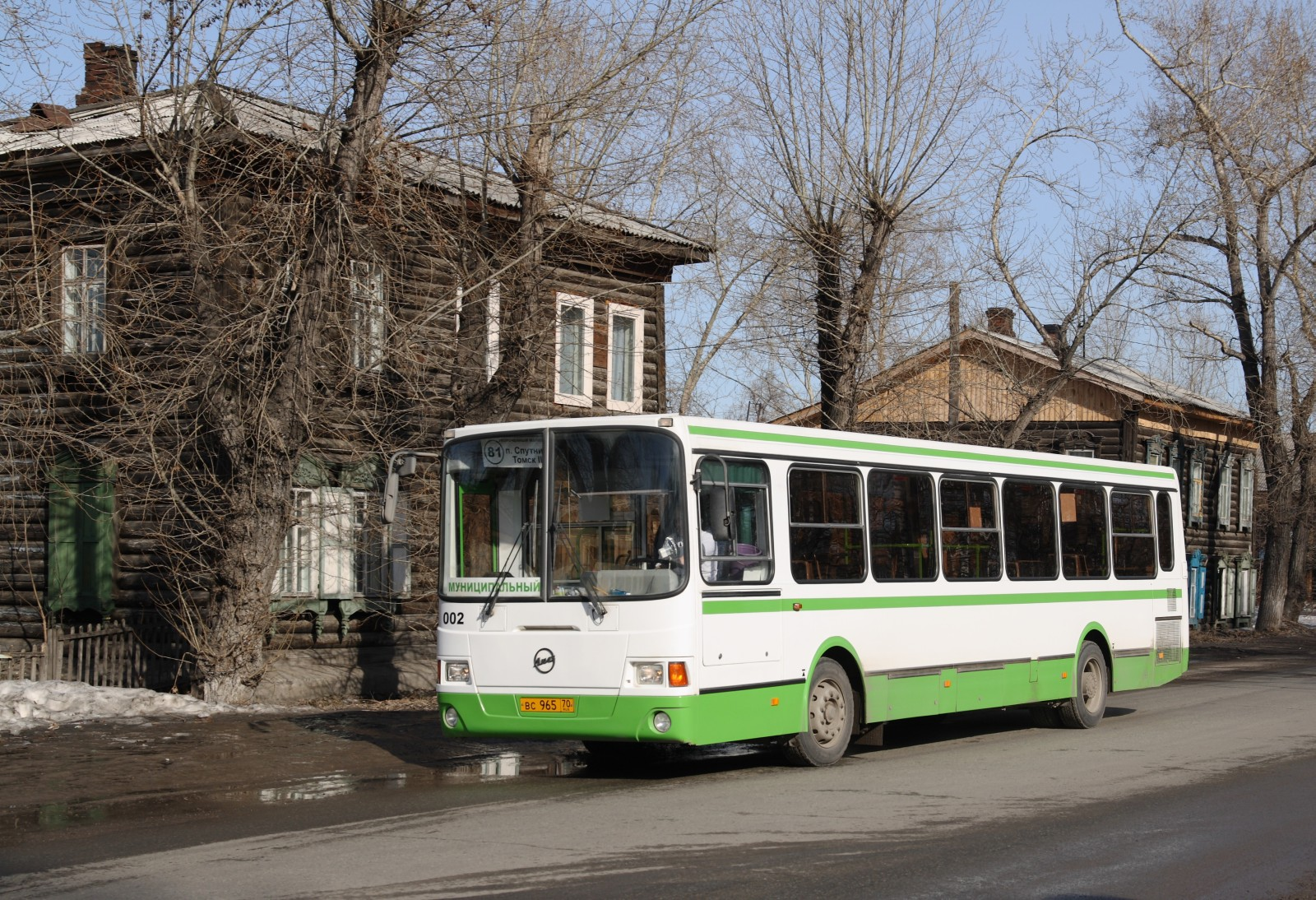
LiAZ-5256

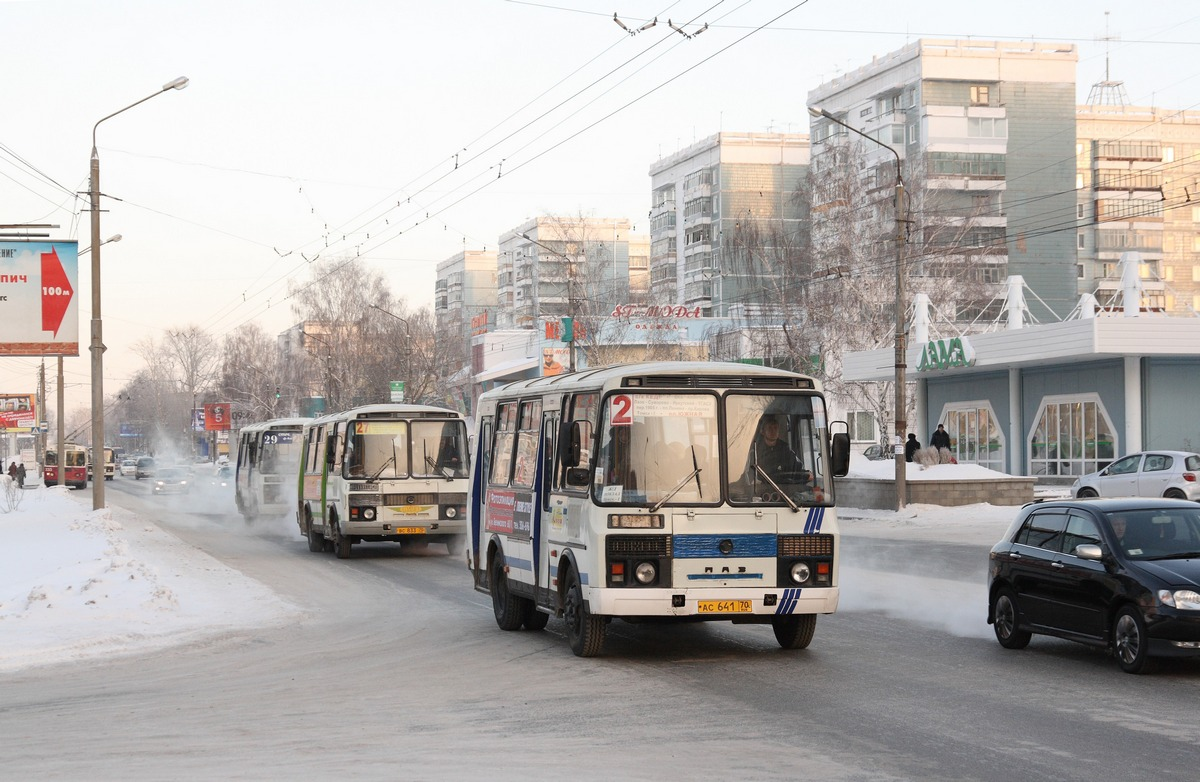
PAZ-3205

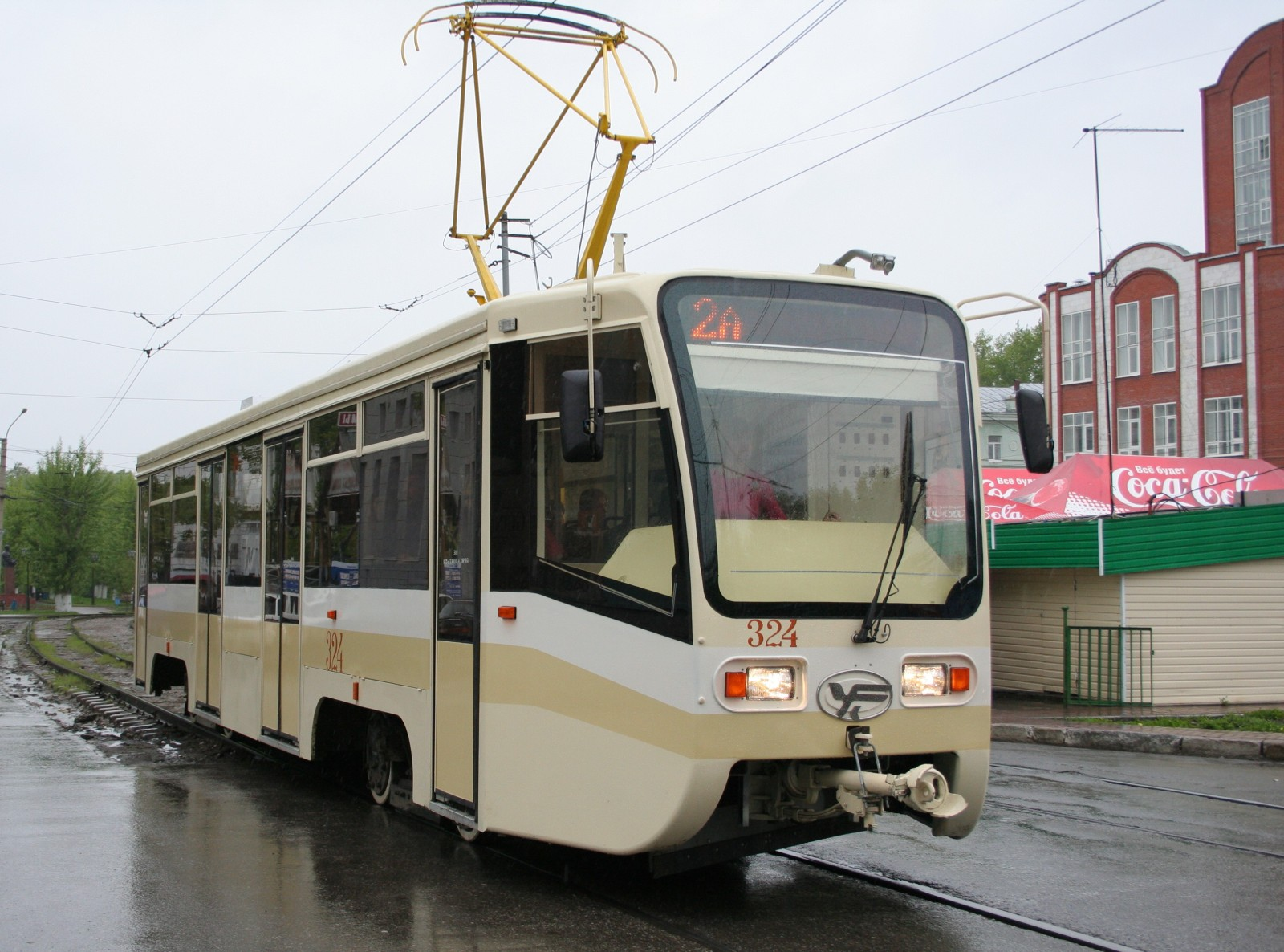
Tram KTM-19 (71-619KT)

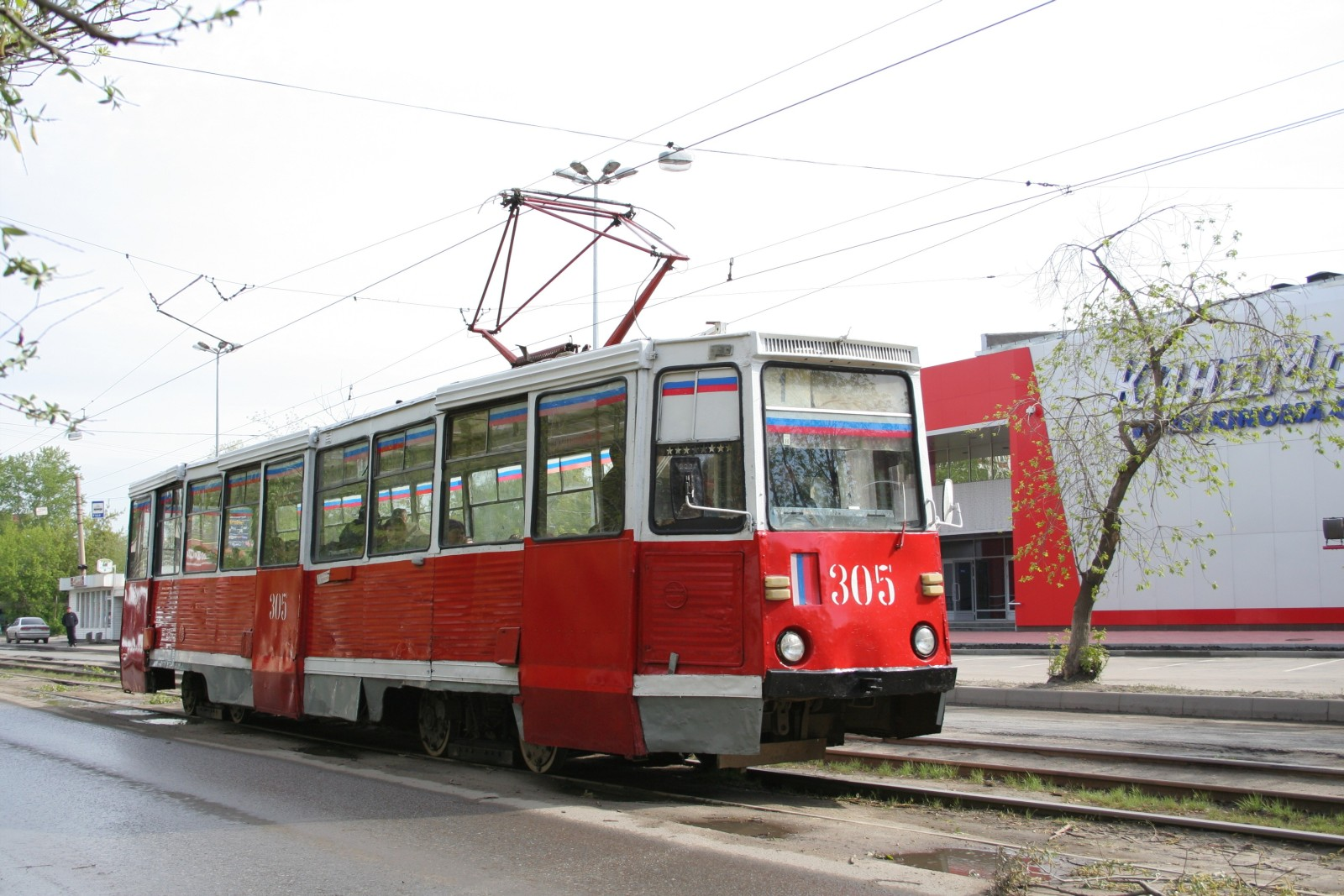
Tram KTM-5M3 (71-605)

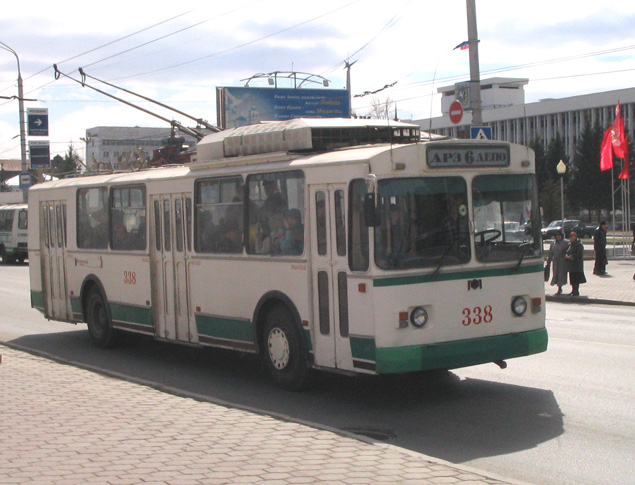
Tomsk trolley

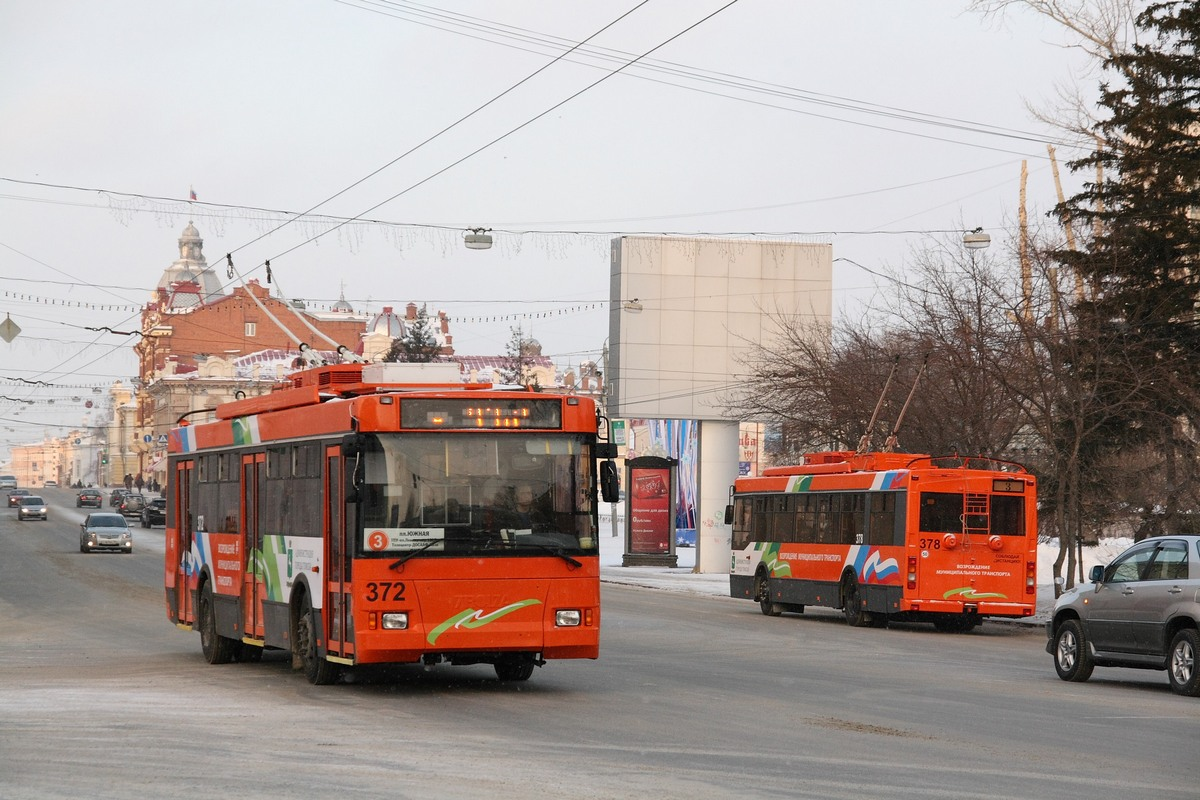
Trolleybuses Trolza

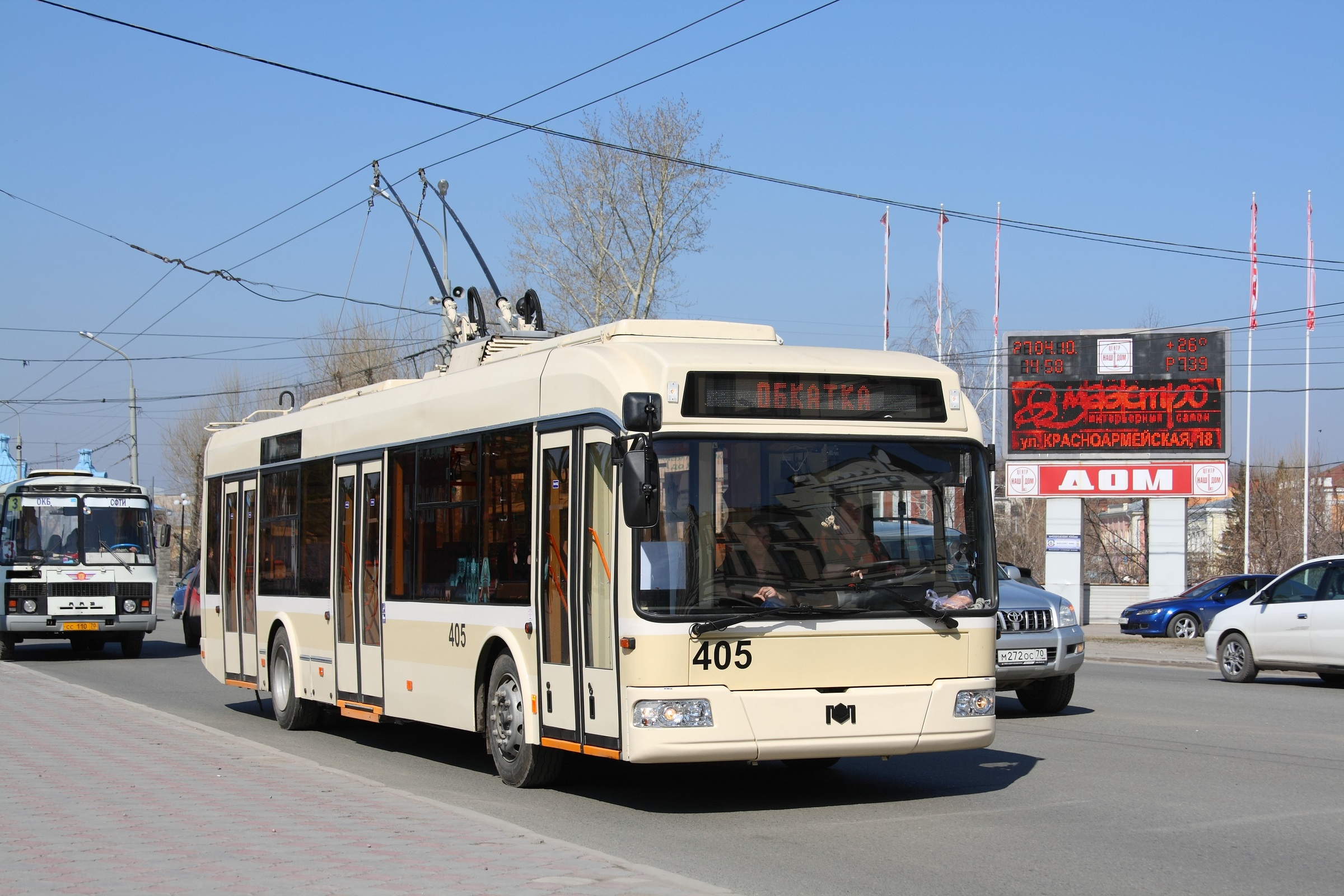
AKSM-321 low-floor trolleybus

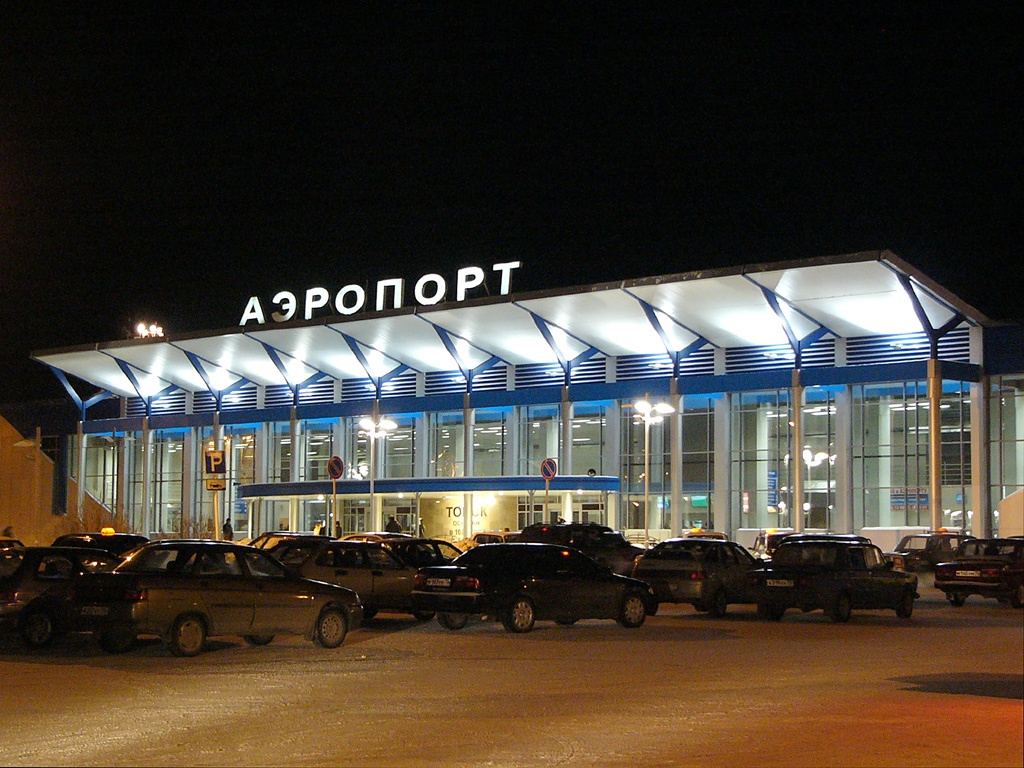
Bogashevo Airport

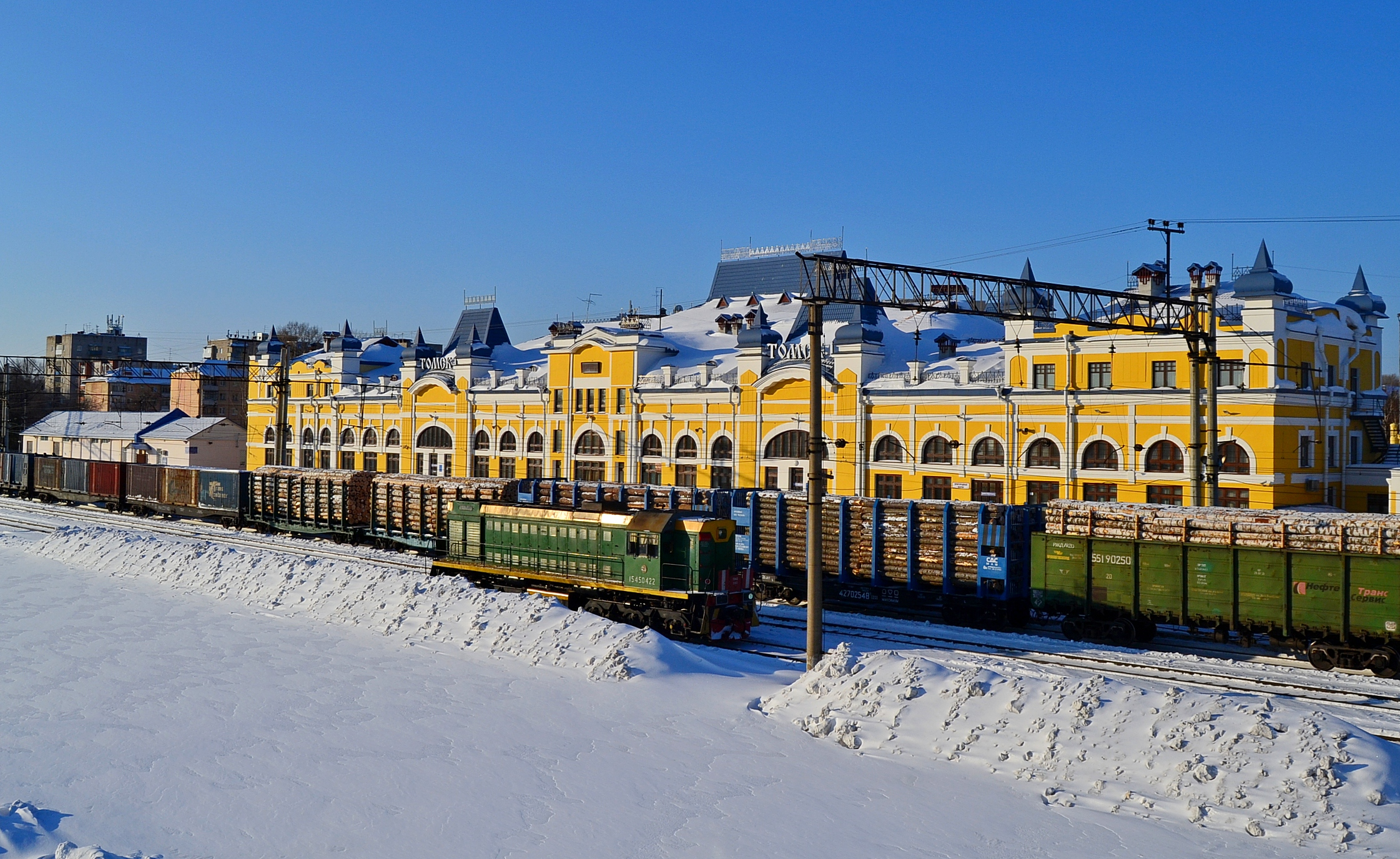
Tomsk-1 railway station

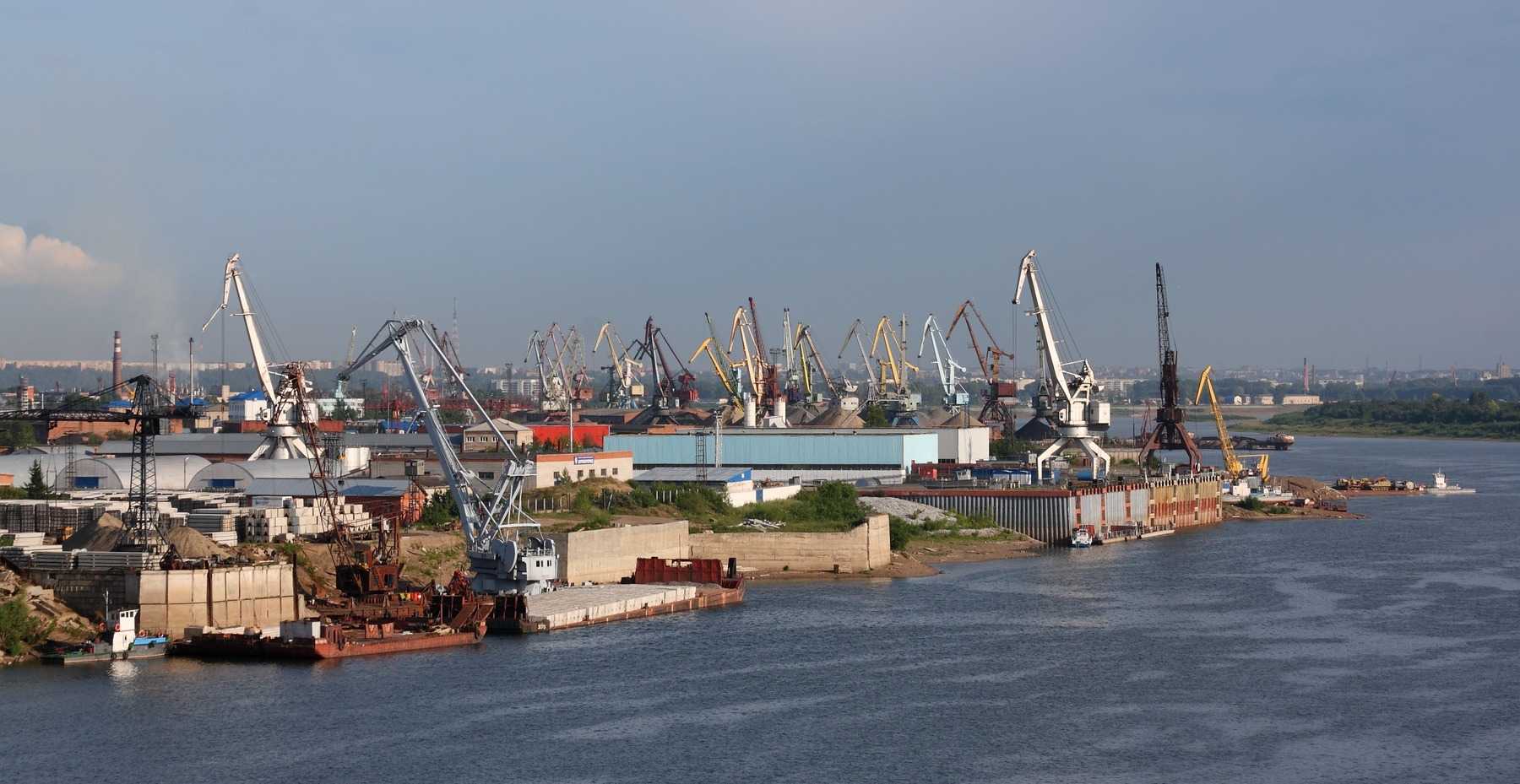
Tomsk River Port

=== Air transportation ===
The city is served by Bogashevo Airport, which offers both domestic and international flights. Located 20 kilometers from the city center, the airport was renovated in 2013. The airport is home to offices for S7 Airlines, Aeroflot, Ural Airlines, Turukhan Airlines, NordStar Airlines, RusLine, Red Wings Airlines, ALROSA, and UTair Aviation.

=== Water transportation ===
There is a commercial and passenger port on the Tom River.

== Culture ==
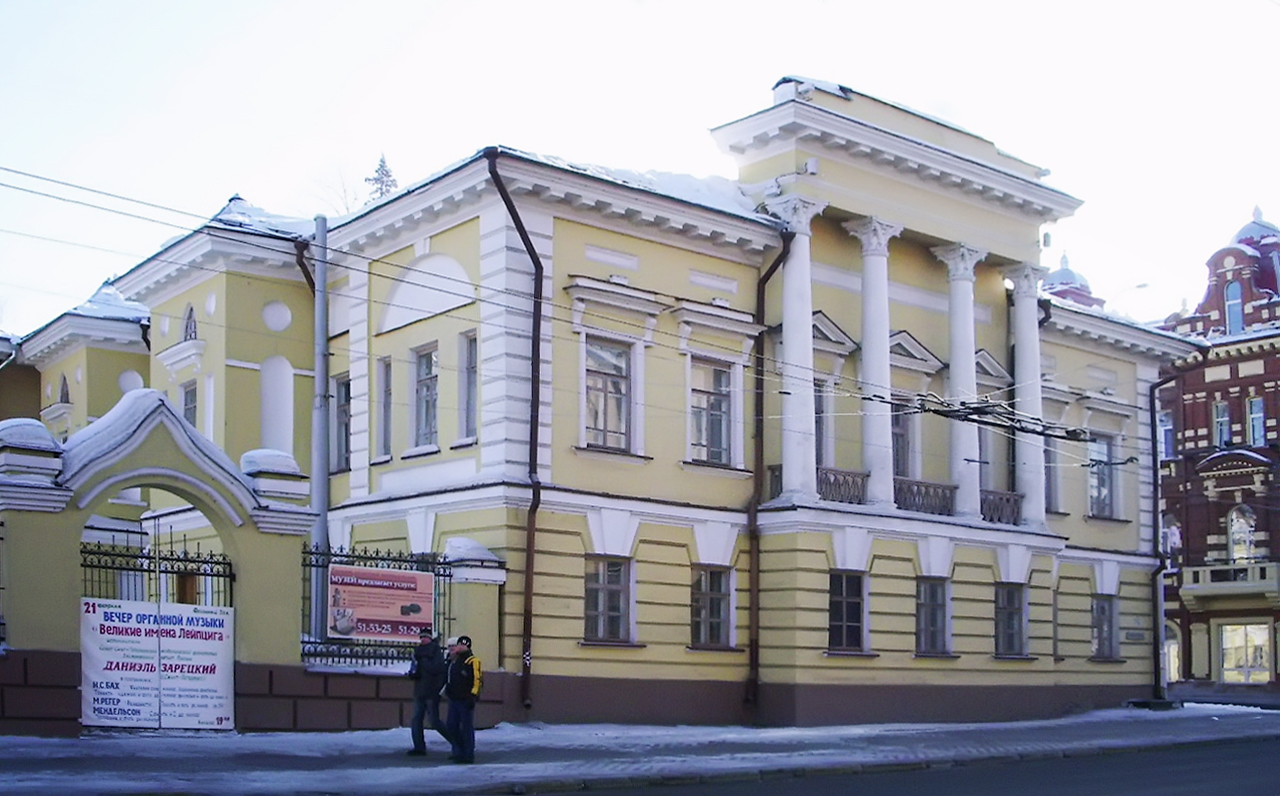
Tomsk Museum for Regional Studies and the Organ Hall of the Philharmonic

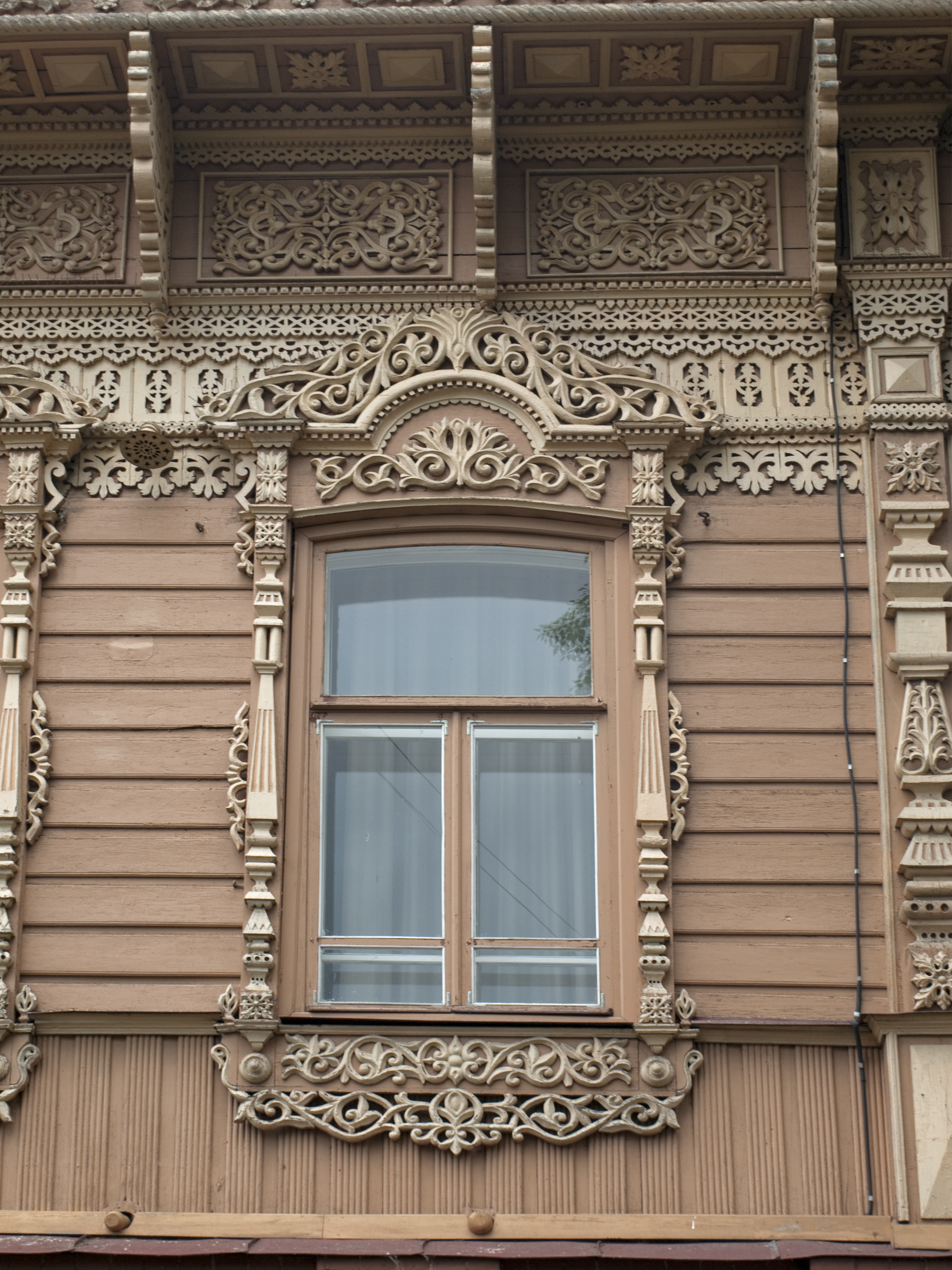
Example of wood carving in Tomsk wooden architecture

Tomsk has many local cultural institutions including several drama theaters, as well as a children's theater and a puppet theater. Major concert venues in the city include the Conservatory Concert hall and the Tomsk Palace of Sport. The city also boasts cultural centers dedicated to German, Polish and Tatar languages and culture.

One of the city's prominent theaters was destroyed in an act of terrorism in 1905. The Korolevsky Theater (built in 1884–85) was being used by a group of communist revolutionaries when the theater was attacked and set on fire by members of the Black Hundred, a hard-line nationalist organization. Those who escaped the flames were gunned down by Black Hundred members waiting outside the theater. Estimates put the number of casualties between 200 and 1000.

There are a number of museums in Tomsk devoted to various subjects, most notably art, local history and wood carving. There is also a Museum of Oppression, housed in a former KGB dungeon. Tomsk State University has a number of small museums with exhibits on archaeology, paleontology, zoology, as well as a herbarium and a botanical garden

As in many other cities in the former Soviet Union, the revolutionary government destroyed a number of old churches in the city including two that had existed since the 17th century. However, Tomsk managed to save some of its churches by transforming them into machine shops, warehouses, archives, and even residential buildings. Since the end of the communist era some of the churches have been renovated and returned to their congregations.

Tomsk is well known for its intricate "gingerbread" decoration of traditional wooden houses in the area. However, the number of old homes in this style is decreasing due to redevelopment or some of them catching fire, as the structures have little to no fire protection.

Trud (Labor) Stadium, in central Tomsk was the base for matches with the FC Tom Tomsk, the city's professional football club, before dissolving in 2022. The team's 2004 promotion to the Russian Premier League gave local fans a chance to see some of the nation's best teams play at the city's own stadium.

Tomsk has many local media outlets including the TV2 (Tomsk) television station, shut down by the authorities and turned into an internet TV medium, the radio stations Radio Siberia and Echo of Moscow in Tomsk along with several newspapers (Tomskaya Nedelya, Krasnoye Znamya and Vechernii Tomsk).

In April 2006 Tomsk received international media attention as the venue of a major summit on economic cooperation, held in the city between Russian President Vladimir Putin and German Chancellor Angela Merkel.

== Notable people ==
- Theodore Kuzmich of Tomsk (1776/1777 – 1864), Russian Orthodox saint
- Mikhail Bakunin (1814–1876), anarchist
- Maria Bochkareva (1889–1920), soldier
- Nikolai Borschevsky (b. 1965), hockey player
- Nikolay Burdenko (1876–1946), surgeon
- Edison Denisov (1929–1996), musician
- Nikolai Erdman (1900–1970), dramatist
- Abram Petrovich Gannibal (c. 1696 – 1781), general
- Leonid Govorov (1897–1955), Marshal of the Soviet Union
- Murat Kamaletdinov (1928–2013), geologist
- Nikolay Kamov (1902–1973), engineer
- Sasha Kaun (b. 1985), basketball player
- Sergey Kirov (1886–1934), statesman
- Nikolai Klyuev (1884–1937), poet
- Vladimir Korolenko (1853–1921), writer
- Danil Kryshkovets (b. 2007), Counter-Strike 2 player better known as "donk"
- Valerian Kuybyshev (1888–1935), revolutionary
- Yegor Ligachyov (1920–2021), statesman
- Mikhail Mil (1909–1970), helicopter designer
- Theodor Molien (1861–1941), mathematician
- Nikolai Nikitin (1907–1973), engineer
- Vladimir Obruchev (1863–1956), scientist
- Anatoly Pepelyayev (1891–1938), general
- Ivan Petlin (17th century), traveler
- Grigory Potanin (1835–1920), geographer
- Alexander Radishchev (1749–1802), writer, philosopher
- Nikolay Rukavishnikov (1932–2002), cosmonaut
- Gustav Shpet (1879–1937), philosopher
- Pyotr Sobolevsky (1904–1977), actor
- Konstantin Staniukovich (1843–1903), writer
- Kanysh Satbayev (1899–1964), geologist
- Herzl Yankl Tsam (1835–1915), military officer
- Mikhail Usov (1883–1939), geologist
- Karl Vaino (1923–2022), Estonian SSR politician
- Alexander Volkov (1891–1977), writer
- Lyubov Yegorova (b. 1966), Olympic cross-country skier
- Yakov Yurovsky (1878–1938), Bolshevik
- Dropgun, EDM DJs and producers

== International relations ==
Tomsk is the only non-capital member of the Asian Network of Major Cities 21.

=== Twin towns and sister cities ===
Tomsk is twinned with:

- Monroe, Michigan, United States
- Toledo, Ohio, United States
- (Georgia (country)) Tbilisi, Georgia
- Novorossiysk, Russia
- Smolensk, Russia
- Ulsan, South Korea

== See also ==
- Akademgorodok in Tomsk
- Church of the Intercession of the Virgin Mary, Tomsk
