= Akademgorodok (disambiguation) =

Akademgorodok, in Novosibirsk, is the educational and scientific centre of Siberia.

Other regional science centers in the former USSR named Akademgorodok (Russian: Академгородок, "Academic Town") include:

- Akademgorodok (Krasnoyarsk), in Krasnoyarsk, Russia
- Akademgorodok (Tomsk), in Tomsk, Russia
- Akademgorodok (Irkutsk) in Irkutsk Oblast, Russia
- Akademgorodok (Apatity) in Apatity, Murmansk Oblast, Russia

== See also ==
- Akademmistechko (disambiguation)
