= Krasnoyarsk Northeast =

- IATA: none; ICAO: UNKM

Summary
- Airport type: Military
- Location: Krasnoyarsk
- Elevation AMSL: 676 ft / 206 m
- Coordinates: 56°2′30″N 092°54′24″E
- Interactive map of Krasnoyarsk Northeast

Runways
Direction	Length		Surface
Direction	ft	m	Surface
	6,562	2,000	Concrete

Krasnoyarsk Northeast was an air base in Russia located 4 km northeast of Krasnoyarsk. The airfield was the western end of the ALSIB Alaska-Siberia air route for Lend-Lease aircraft during World War II including Bell P-39 Airacobras and North American B-25 Mitchells. After the end of World War II, air base was converted in Krasnoyarsk-Severniy Airport, which was used until 1988. In the early 1990th, the former airfield has been converted into apartment complexes. There was an Antonov An-2 maintenance facility, which is now gone. It was a utilitarian airfield with An-2, An-24, and An-6 aircraft, probably now based at Krasnoyarsk Yemelyanovo Airport.
