= Krasnoyarsk =

City in Krasnoyarsk Krai, Russia

Krasnoyarsk Красноярск
- City
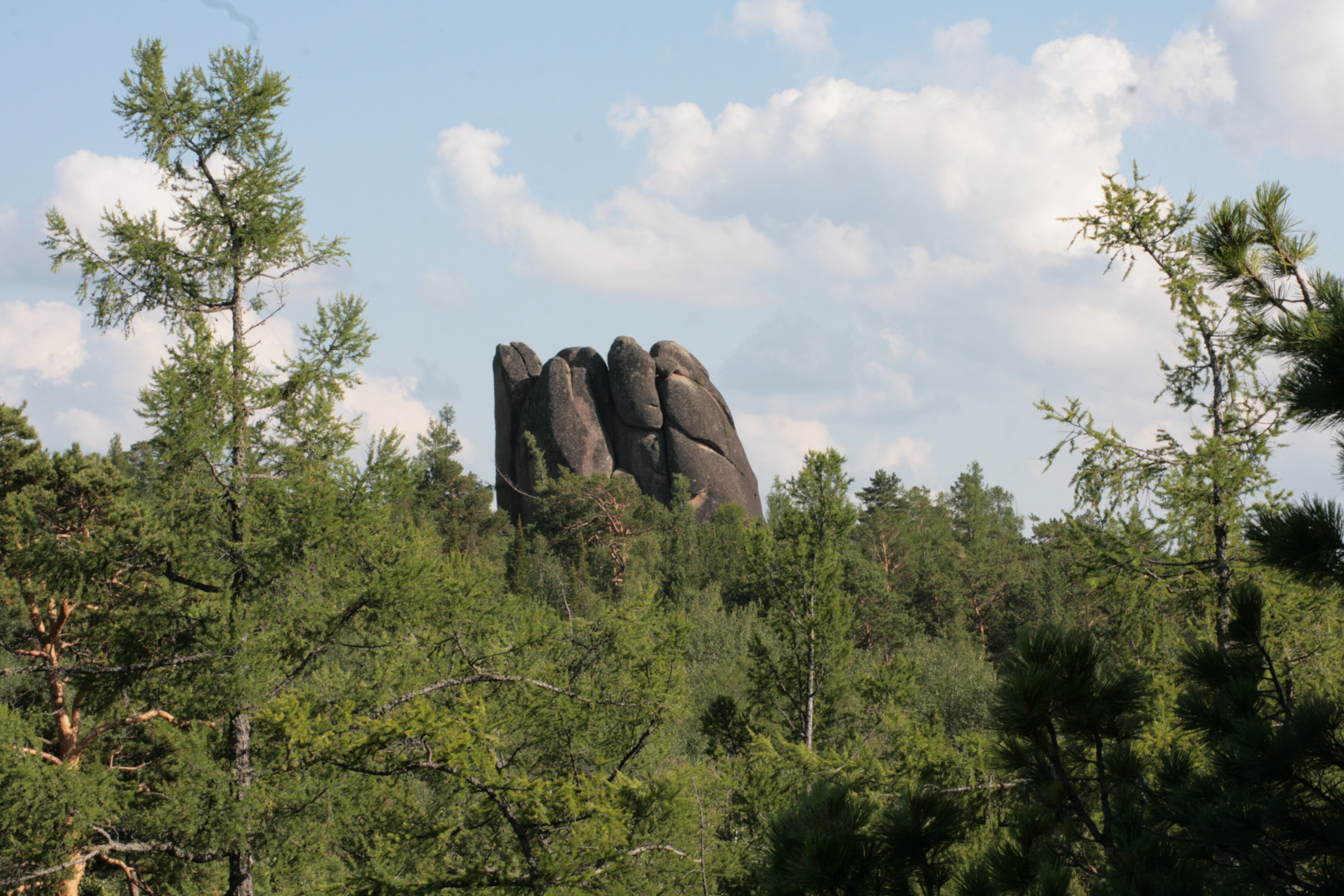
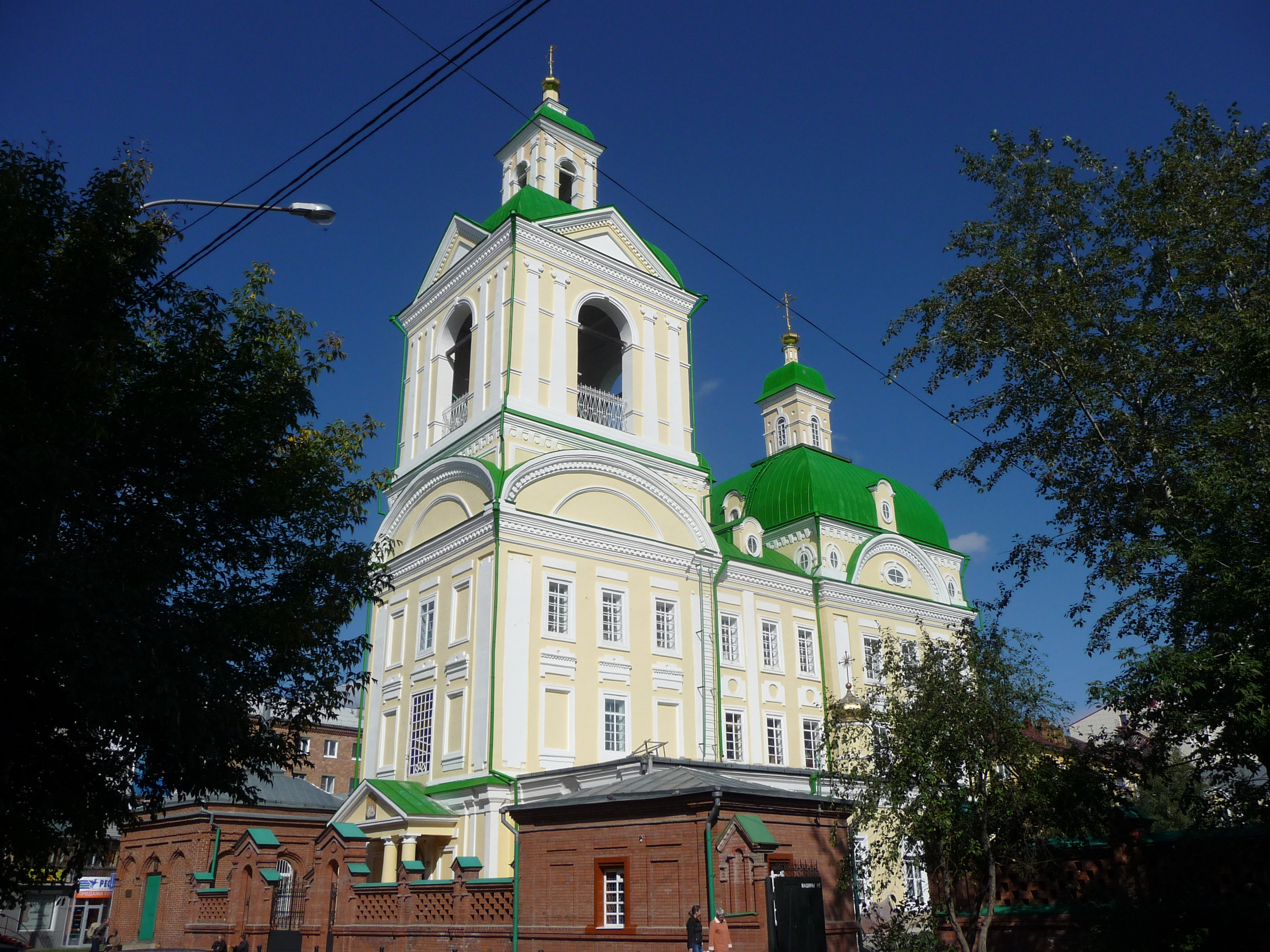
- Krasnoyarsk railway station Krasnoyarsk Pillars Theatre Square Annunciation Cathedral Krasnoyarsk opera theatre Krasnoyarsk along the Yenisey River

- Flag Coat of arms
- Anthem: Anthem of Krasnoyarsk
- Interactive map of Krasnoyarsk
- Location of Krasnoyarsk Krasnoyarsk (Krasnoyarsk Krai)
- Coordinates: 56°00′32″N 92°52′19″E
- Country: Russia
- Federal subject: Krasnoyarsk Krai
- Founded: 19 August 1628
- City status since: 1690

Government
  - Body: Krasnoyarsk City Council of Deputies
  - Head: Sergei Vereshchagin

Area
  - Total: 348 km^{2} (134 sq mi)
- Elevation: 162 m (531 ft)

Population
  - Estimate (2025): 1,211,756 )
  - Rank: 6th in 2010

Administrative status
  - Subordinated to: krai city of Krasnoyarsk
  - Capital of: krai city of Krasnoyarsk, Krasnoyarsk Krai

Municipal status
  - Urban okrug: Krasnoyarsk Urban Okrug
  - Capital of: Krasnoyarsk Urban Okrug
- Time zone: UTC+7 (MSK+4)
- Postal codes: 660000, 660001, 660003–660005, 660006, 660009–660023, 660025, 660027, 660028, 660030–660032, 660036, 660037, 660041–660043, 660046–660050, 660052, 660054–660056, 660058–660062, 660064, 660067–660069, 660071, 660073–660075, 660077–660079, 660091–660095, 660097–660100, 660113, 660115, 660118, 660119, 660121–660127, 660130–660133, 660135, 660136, 660880, 660890, 660899, 660911–660946, 660960–660966, 660970, 660999, 901175, 901177, 901179, 901181, 993600
- Dialing code: +7 391
- OKTMO ID: 04701000001
- City Day: Second Sunday of June
- Website: www.admkrsk.ru

Krasnoyarsk (Note: /ˌkræsnəˈjɑːrsk, ˌkrɑːs-/ KRA(H)SS-nə-YARSK; Russian: Красноя́рск, IPA: [krəsnɐˈjarsk]) is the largest city and administrative centre of Krasnoyarsk Krai, Russia. It is situated along the Yenisey River, and is the second-largest city in Siberia after Novosibirsk, with a population of over 1.1 million. Krasnoyarsk is an important junction of the renowned Trans-Siberian Railway, and is one of the largest producers of aluminum in the country. The city is known for its natural landscape; author Anton Chekhov judged Krasnoyarsk to be the most beautiful city in Siberia. The Stolby Nature Sanctuary is located 10km south of the city. Krasnoyarsk is a major educational centre in Siberia, and hosts the Siberian Federal University. In 2019, Krasnoyarsk was the host city of the 2019 Winter Universiade, the third hosted in Russia.

== Etymology ==
The predecessor fort was named Krasny Yar (Russian: Кра́сный Яр) after the Yarin (a dialect of Khakas) name of the place where it was built, Kyzyl Char ('red steep-riverbank'), which was translated as Krasny (red) Yar.

== History ==
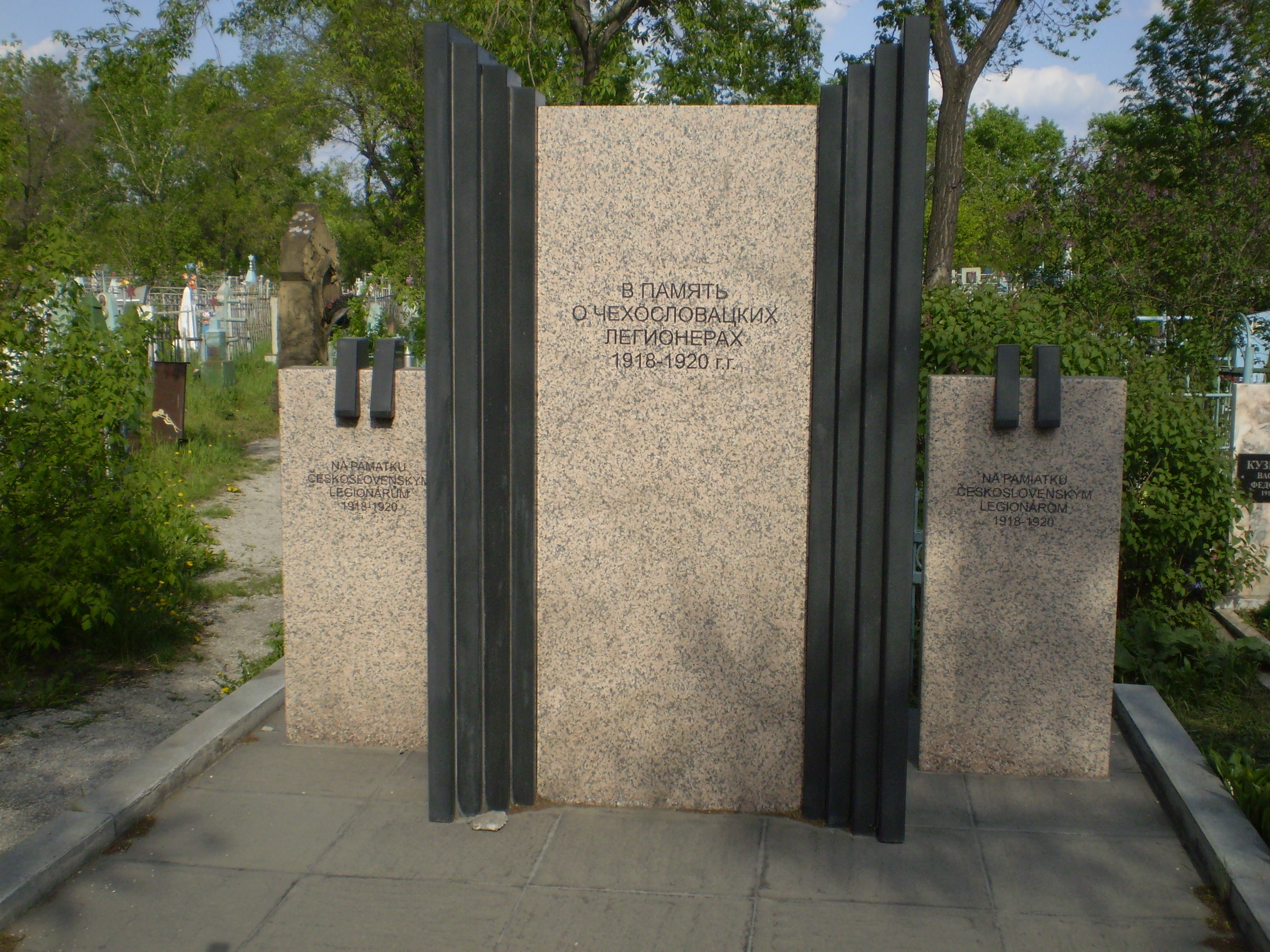
Monument in the Trinity Cemetery to the Czecho-Slovak Legion, which controlled the Trans-Siberian Railway during the Russian Civil War

The city was founded on 19 August 1628, as a Russian border fort when a group of service class people from Yeniseysk led by Andrey Dubenskiy arrived at the confluence of the Kacha and Yenisei Rivers and constructed fortifications intended to protect the frontier from attacks of native peoples who lived along the Yenisei and its tributaries. Along with Kansk to the east, it represented the southern limit of Russian expansion in the Yenisei basin during the seventeenth century. In a letter to Tsar Michael I the Cossacks reported:

...The town of trunks (log buildings) we have constructed and around the place of fort, we the servants of thee, our Lord, have embedded posts and fastened them with double bindings and the place of fort have strengthened mightily...

The settlement was granted town status in 1690. An intensive growth of Krasnoyarsk began with the arrival of the Siberian Route (the road M53 nowadays) in 1735 to 1741 which connected the nearby towns of Achinsk and Kansk with Krasnoyarsk and with the rest of Russia.

In 1749, a meteorite with a mass of about 700 kg (1,500 lb) was found 230 kilometres (140 miles) south of Krasnoyarsk. It was excavated by Peter Simon Pallas in 1772 and transported to Krasnoyarsk and subsequently to Saint Petersburg. The Krasnoyarsk meteorite was the first pallasite ever studied and the first meteorite ever etched.

In 1822, Krasnoyarsk became the administrative centre of Yeniseysk Governorate. By the end of the 19th century, Krasnoyarsk had several manufacturing facilities and railroad workshops and an engine house. Growth continued with the discovery of gold and the arrival of a railroad in 1895.

In the Russian Empire, Krasnoyarsk was one of the places to which political exiles were banished. For example, eight Decembrists were deported from St. Petersburg to Krasnoyarsk after the failure of the revolt.

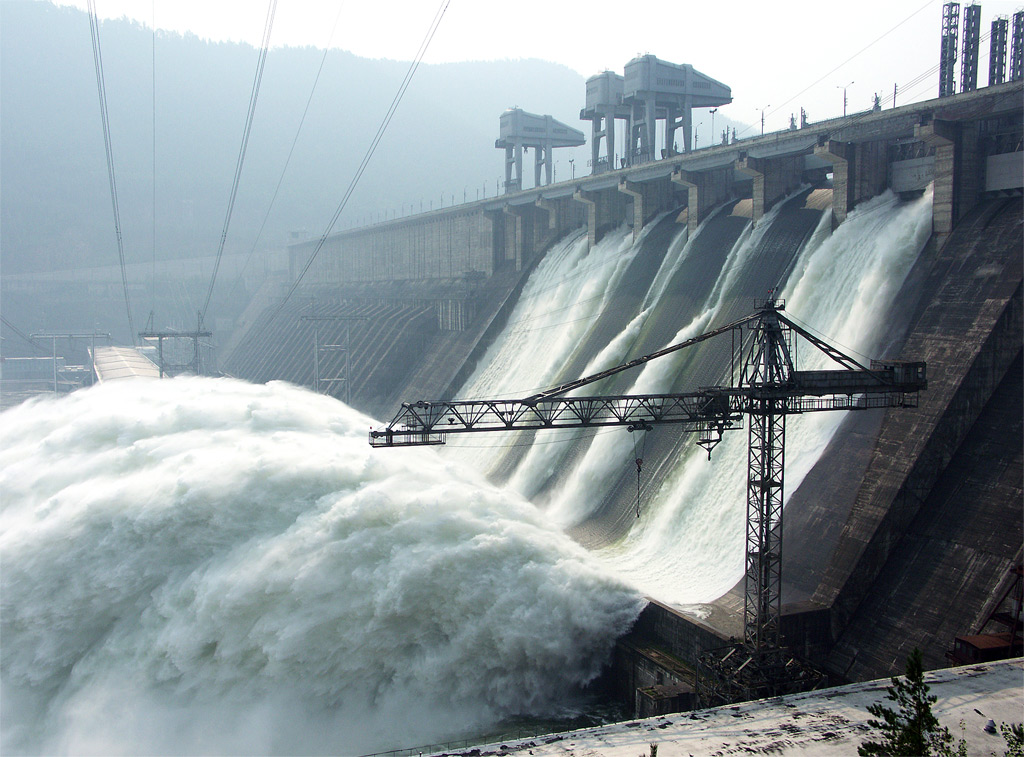
Krasnoyarsk hydroelectric dam

In the aftermath of the Russian Revolution of 1917, during the Russian Civil War, Siberia east of Omsk was controlled by white forces under Alexander Kolchak, who in December 1919 retreated east to Irkutsk and the Bolsheviks took control of the city. On a plateau 7km outside of town was a prisoner of war camp with 13,000 German and Austro-Hungarian troops. Elsa Brändström of the Swedish Red Cross spent almost a year there from July 1919 until May 1920.

During the periods of centralised planning (Five Year Plans), numerous large plants and factories were constructed in Krasnoyarsk: Sibtyazhmash, the dock yard, the paper factory, the hydroelectric power station (now the fifth largest in the world and the second in Russia), and the river port.

In 1934, Krasnoyarsk Krai was formed, with Krasnoyarsk as its administrative centre.

During Stalinist times, Krasnoyarsk was a major centre of the gulag system. The most important labour camp was the Kraslag or Krasnoyarsky ITL (1938-c. 1960) with the two units located in Kansk and Reshyoty. In the city of Krasnoyarsk itself, the Yeniseylag or Yeniseysky ITL labour camp was prominent as well during World War II (c. 1940–41).

During World War II, dozens of factories were evacuated from Ukraine and Western Russia to Krasnoyarsk and nearby towns, stimulating the industrial growth of the city. After the war, additional large plants were constructed: the aluminum plant, the metallurgic plant, the plant of base metals and many others.

In the late 1970s, the Soviet Union began constructing a phased array radar station at Abalakova, near Krasnoyarsk, which violated the ABM Treaty. Beginning in 1983, the United States demanded its removal, until the Soviet Union admitted the radar station was a violation in 1989. Equipment was slowly removed from the site and by 1992 it was officially declared to be dismantled, though the equipment from the site was likely relocated to a new site near Komsomolsk-on-Amur. Krasnoyarsk was also home to Krasnoyarsk Northeast air base, which was turned into living blocks after the dissolution of the Soviet Union.

After the dissolution of the Soviet Union and beginning of privatisation, many large plants and factories, such as the Krasnoyarsk Aluminium Plant, became owned by alleged criminal authorities and oligarchs, while others were declared bankrupt. The economic transition resulted in a dramatic rise in unemployment and numerous strikes.

The best known financial scandal of the second half of the 1990s happened when ownership of the Krasnoyarsk Aluminium Plant by a known Krasnoyarsk businessman Anatoliy Bykov had been cancelled after he was accused of murdering his partner, Vilor Struganov. The accusation eventually turned out to be false. The Krasnoyarsk plant's ownership problems continue through the early 21st century since nearly all of them are owned either by monopolistic financial groups or by oligarchs.

Since the election of Pyotr Pimashkov as the mayor of Krasnoyarsk in 1996, the appearance of the city gradually improved: the old historical buildings were restored, the asphalt walkways were replaced with paving-stone, and numerous squares and recreation areas with fountains were either restored or constructed from scratch. Now the majority of the city keeps only a few traces of its former, drab, post-collapse look.

== Geography ==
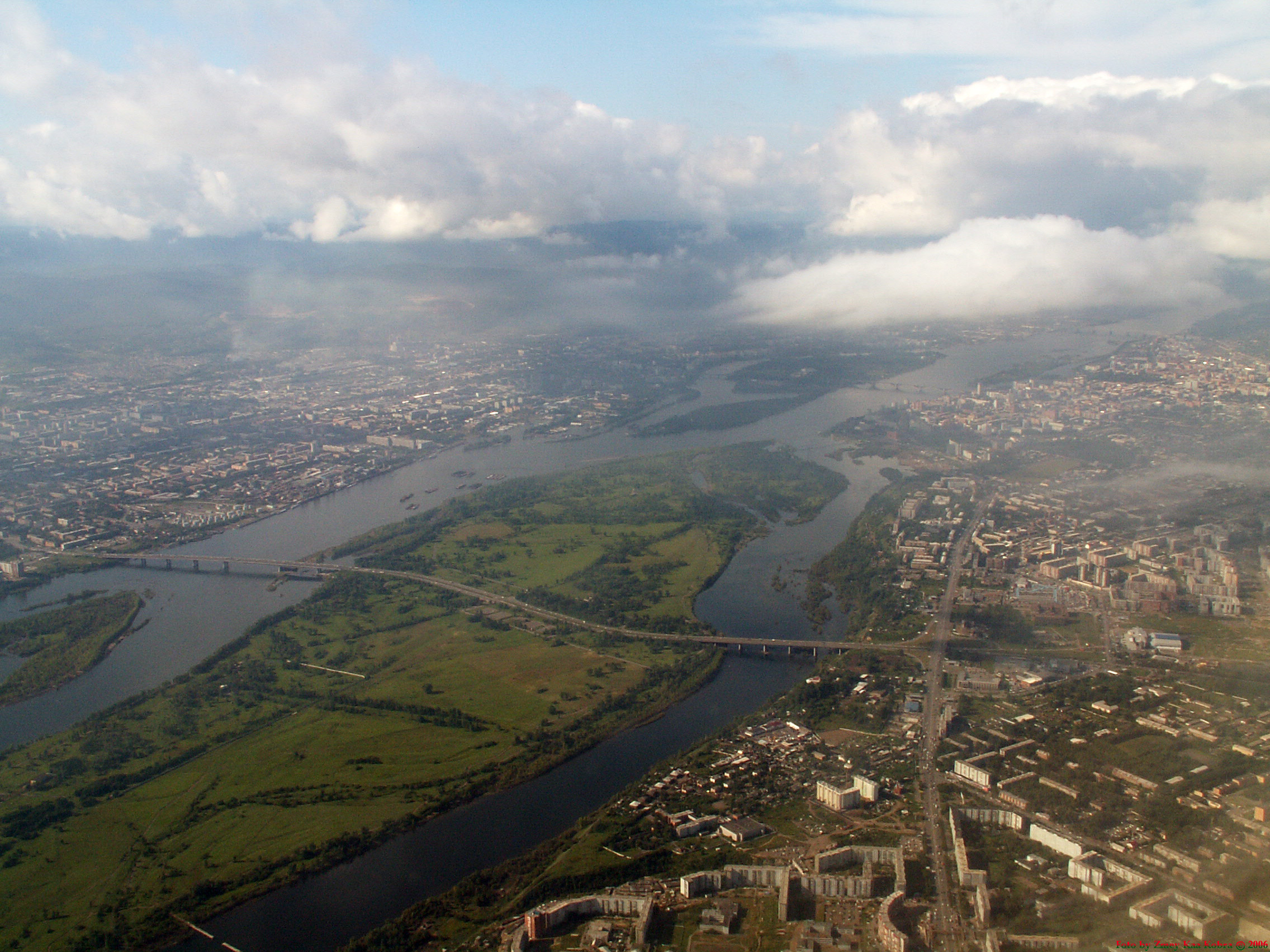
Aerial view of Krasnoyarsk

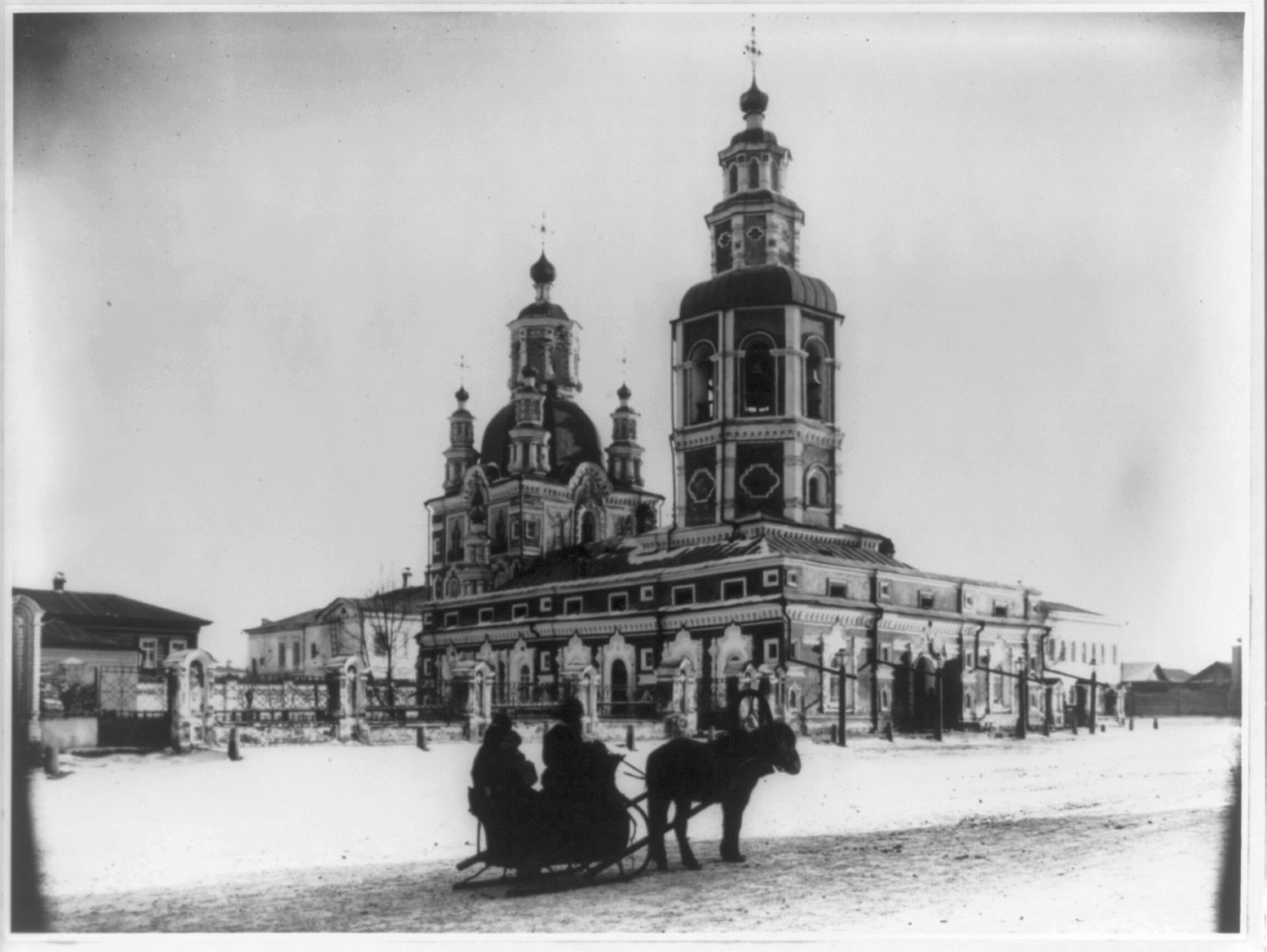
Church in Krasnoyarsk, 1895

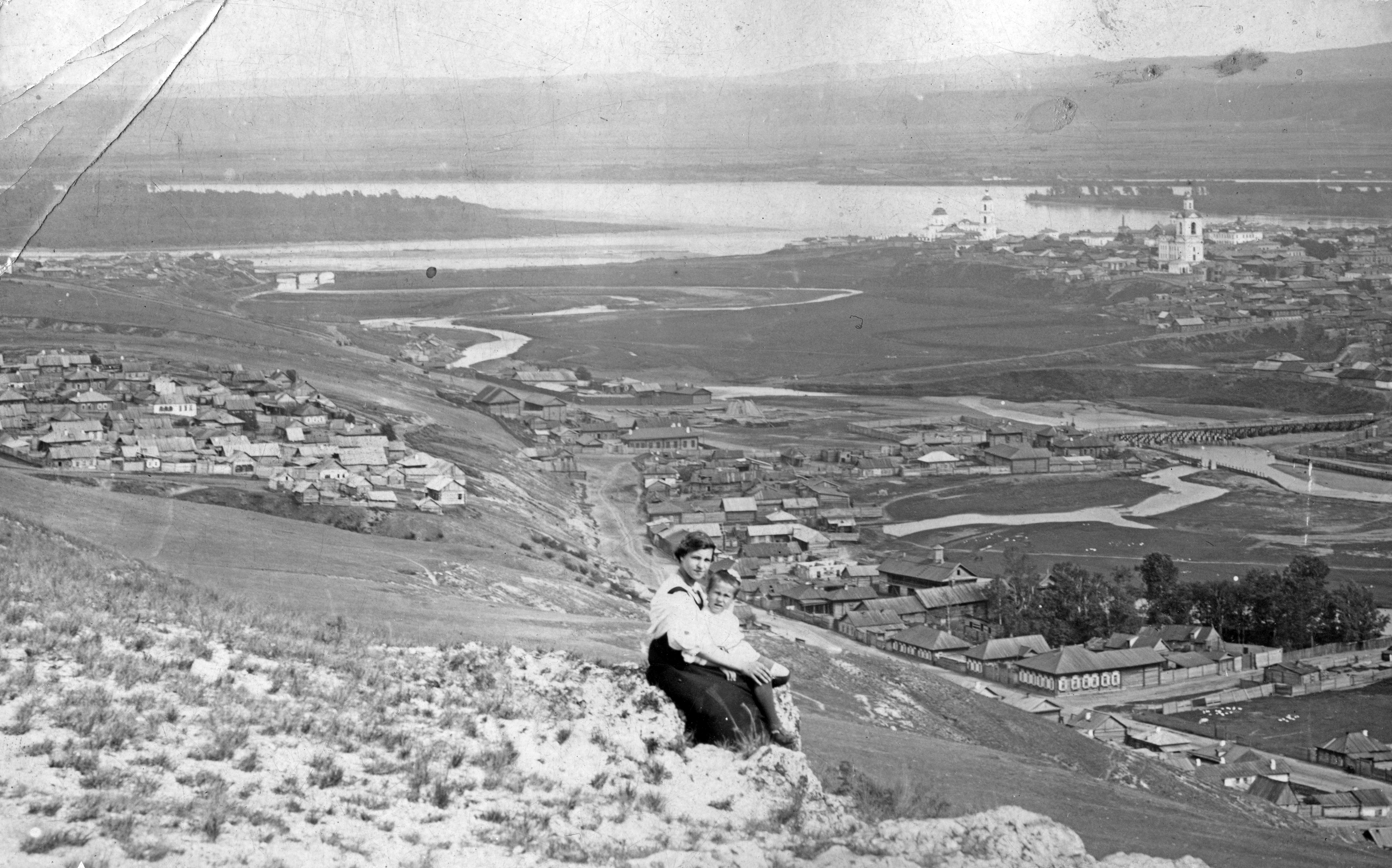
The panorama of Krasnoyarsk from the Karaulnaya Gora hill, 1910

The total area of the city, including suburbs and the river, is 348 km^{2} (134 sq mi).

The river Yenisei flows from west to east through the city. Due to the Krasnoyarsk hydroelectric dam 32 km (20 mi) upstream, the Yenisei never freezes in winter and never exceeds +14 °C (57 °F) in summer through the city. Near the city centre, its elevation is 136 m (446 ft) above sea level. There are several islands in the river, the largest of which are Tatyshev and Otdyha Isles, used mainly for recreation.

To the south and west, Krasnoyarsk is surrounded by forested mountains averaging 410 m (1,350 ft) in height above river level. The most prominent of them are Nikolayevskaya Sopka (notable for its ski jumping tracks), Karaulnaya Gora, and Chornaya Sopka, the latter being an extinct volcano. The gigantic rock cliffs of the Stolby Nature Reserve rise from the mountains of the southern bank of the Yenisei, the western hills from the Gremyachaya Griva crest extending westwards up to the Sobakina River, the north is generally plain, except for the Drokinskaya Sopka hill, with forests to the northwest and agricultural fields to the north and east.

The major rivers in and near Krasnoyarsk are the Yenisei, Mana, Bazaikha, and Kacha Rivers, the latter flowing throughout the historical centre of the city. Due to the nature of the terrain, a few natural lakes exist in the vicinity of Krasnoyarsk.

The forests close to the city are mostly pine and birch; further afield, aspen becomes dominant in many areas. The moss-covered fir and Siberian pine replaces other wood in the mountains westward of the Karaulnaya River, in about 15 km (9.3 mi) to the west from the city, the forests to the south are mostly pine, fir and aspen.

== Administrative and municipal status ==
Krasnoyarsk is the administrative centre of the krai. Within the framework of administrative divisions, it is, together with one rural locality (the village of Peschanka) incorporated as the krai city of Krasnoyarsk – an administrative unit with the status equal to that of the districts. As a municipal division, the krai city of Krasnoyarsk is incorporated as Krasnoyarsk Urban Okrug.

=== City divisions ===
For administrative purposes, Krasnoyarsk is divided into seven city districts:

- Kirovsky District
- Leninsky District
- Oktyabrsky District
- Sovetsky District
- Sverdlovsky District
- Tsentralny District
- Zheleznodorozhny District

== Coat of arms ==
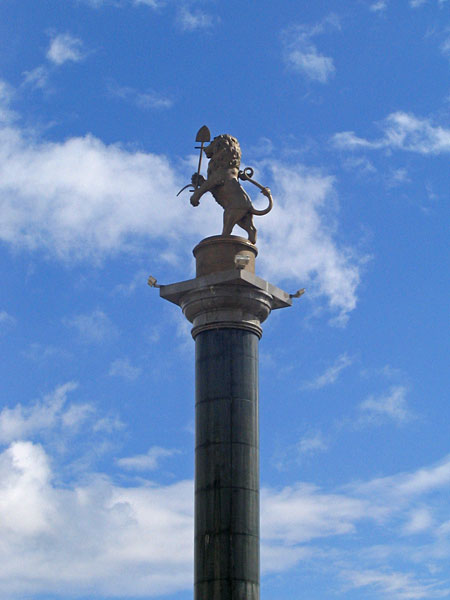
The Krasnoyarsk Lion

The first version was approved on 12 March 1804. The coat of arms was divided horizontally into two parts, the upper part containing the coat of arms of Tomsk Governorate, and the lower part picturing the Krasny Yar cliff on a silver background. A revised coat of arms, approved on 23 November 1851, had the golden figure of a lion placed on a red heraldic shield with a spade in the right fore paw and a sickle in the left fore paw, both made of the same metal. The shield was topped with the golden crown of the Russian Empire. The current coat of arms (as depicted here) was approved on 28 November 2004. It contains the same red shield as in 1851 but with a slightly changed figure of the lion in the officially approved image. The shield is topped with a form of the mural crown, which is the golden five-tower coronet of rank of a federal subject administrative centre.

== Climate ==
Krasnoyarsk experiences a humid continental climate (Köppen climate classification Dfb). Its climate is very similar to that of Novosibirsk in Russia, Fort McMurray and Winnipeg in Canada, the latter of which is a good deal further south geographically. Compared to Thompson, Manitoba or Labrador City, at similar latitudes, Krasnoyarsk's winters are relatively mild. Compared to European cities on a similar latitude, Krasnoyarsk has much warmer summers, but much colder and longer winters (for example, Aalborg). The summer is also on average warmer than similar inland latitudes of Scandinavia, owing to Siberia's greater continentality. Krasnoyarsk has high differentials between summer and winter temperatures.

Climate data for Krasnoyarsk (1991–2020, extremes 1891–present)
Month	Jan	Feb	Mar	Apr	May	Jun	Jul	Aug	Sep	Oct	Nov	Dec	Year
Record high °C (°F)	6.0 (42.8)	8.5 (47.3)	18.5 (65.3)	31.4 (88.5)	34.0 (93.2)	37.2 (99.0)	36.4 (97.5)	35.1 (95.2)	31.3 (88.3)	24.5 (76.1)	13.6 (56.5)	8.6 (47.5)	37.2 (99.0)
Mean daily maximum °C (°F)	−11.6 (11.1)	−7.5 (18.5)	0.7 (33.3)	9.3 (48.7)	17.1 (62.8)	23.5 (74.3)	25.2 (77.4)	22.2 (72.0)	14.6 (58.3)	6.7 (44.1)	−3.6 (25.5)	−9.3 (15.3)	7.3 (45.1)
Daily mean °C (°F)	−15.6 (3.9)	−12.3 (9.9)	−4.9 (23.2)	3.4 (38.1)	10.4 (50.7)	16.9 (62.4)	19.1 (66.4)	16.1 (61.0)	9.1 (48.4)	2.3 (36.1)	−7.3 (18.9)	−13.2 (8.2)	2.0 (35.6)
Mean daily minimum °C (°F)	−19.2 (−2.6)	−16.3 (2.7)	−9.4 (15.1)	−1.4 (29.5)	4.7 (40.5)	11.1 (52.0)	13.7 (56.7)	11.2 (52.2)	5.0 (41.0)	−1.3 (29.7)	−10.7 (12.7)	−16.9 (1.6)	−2.5 (27.5)
Record low °C (°F)	−52.8 (−63.0)	−41.6 (−42.9)	−38.7 (−37.7)	−25.7 (−14.3)	−11.2 (11.8)	−3.6 (25.5)	3.3 (37.9)	−1.0 (30.2)	−9.6 (14.7)	−25.1 (−13.2)	−42.3 (−44.1)	−47.0 (−52.6)	−52.8 (−63.0)
Average precipitation mm (inches)	17 (0.7)	15 (0.6)	19 (0.7)	29 (1.1)	48 (1.9)	66 (2.6)	70 (2.8)	76 (3.0)	55 (2.2)	42 (1.7)	39 (1.5)	31 (1.2)	507 (20.0)
Average extreme snow depth cm (inches)	16 (6.3)	16 (6.3)	13 (5.1)	3 (1.2)	0 (0)	0 (0)	0 (0)	0 (0)	0 (0)	2 (0.8)	7 (2.8)	14 (5.5)	16 (6.3)
Average rainy days	0.3	0.4	2	9	17	19	18	18	19	13	4	0.3	120
Average snowy days	24	21	17	14	4	0.1	0	0.03	2	14	23	25	144
Average relative humidity (%)	73	70	64	58	54	64	72	76	75	71	74	73	69
Mean monthly sunshine hours	63	100	171	216	251	280	281	237	160	111	58	41	1,969
Source 1: Pogoda.ru.net
Source 2: NOAA (sun only 1961–1990)

== Demographics ==
Historical population
Year	Pop.	±%
1897	26,700	—
1926	69,311	+159.6%
1939	189,977	+174.1%
1959	412,375	+117.1%
1970	648,113	+57.2%
1979	796,305	+22.9%
1989	912,445	+14.6%
2002	909,341	−0.3%
2010	973,826	+7.1%
2021	1,187,771	+22.0%
2025	1,211,756	+2.0%
Sources: Census data, estimate

Population chart (1855–2012)

Population count by districts (2010 Census):

- Kirovsky: 114,715
- Leninsky: 145,530
- Oktyabrsky: 153,112
- Sovetsky: 281,284
- Sverdlovsky: 130,596
- Tsentralny: 55,060
- Zheleznodorozhny: 93,529

The population of Krasnoyarsk includes a number of peoples, the most numerous are Russians, followed by Tajiks, Kyrgyz and other Central Asian and Caucasian peoples, whose number has grown extensively because of the vast, often illegal immigration in search for work. Another populous immigrant group is the Chinese who, unlike other foreign workers, are employed in much more lucrative areas and often form business partnerships with local companies. Many Chinese trade at the bazaars, and a special large Chinese bazaar named Sodruzhestvo (Russian for fellowship), and the Chinese Trading Town (known in Russian as Китайский торговый город) or colloquially Kitai-gorod on Strelka.

As of the 2021 Census, the ethnic composition of Krasnoyarsk was:

Ethnic group	Population	Percentage
Russians	948,949	94.2%
Tajiks	9,057	0.9%
Kyrgyz	8,954	0.9%
Uzbeks	5,577	0.6%
Tatars	4,855	0.5%
Armenians	4,727	0.5%
Azerbaijanis	4,452	0.4%
Other	20,575	2.0%

== Architecture ==
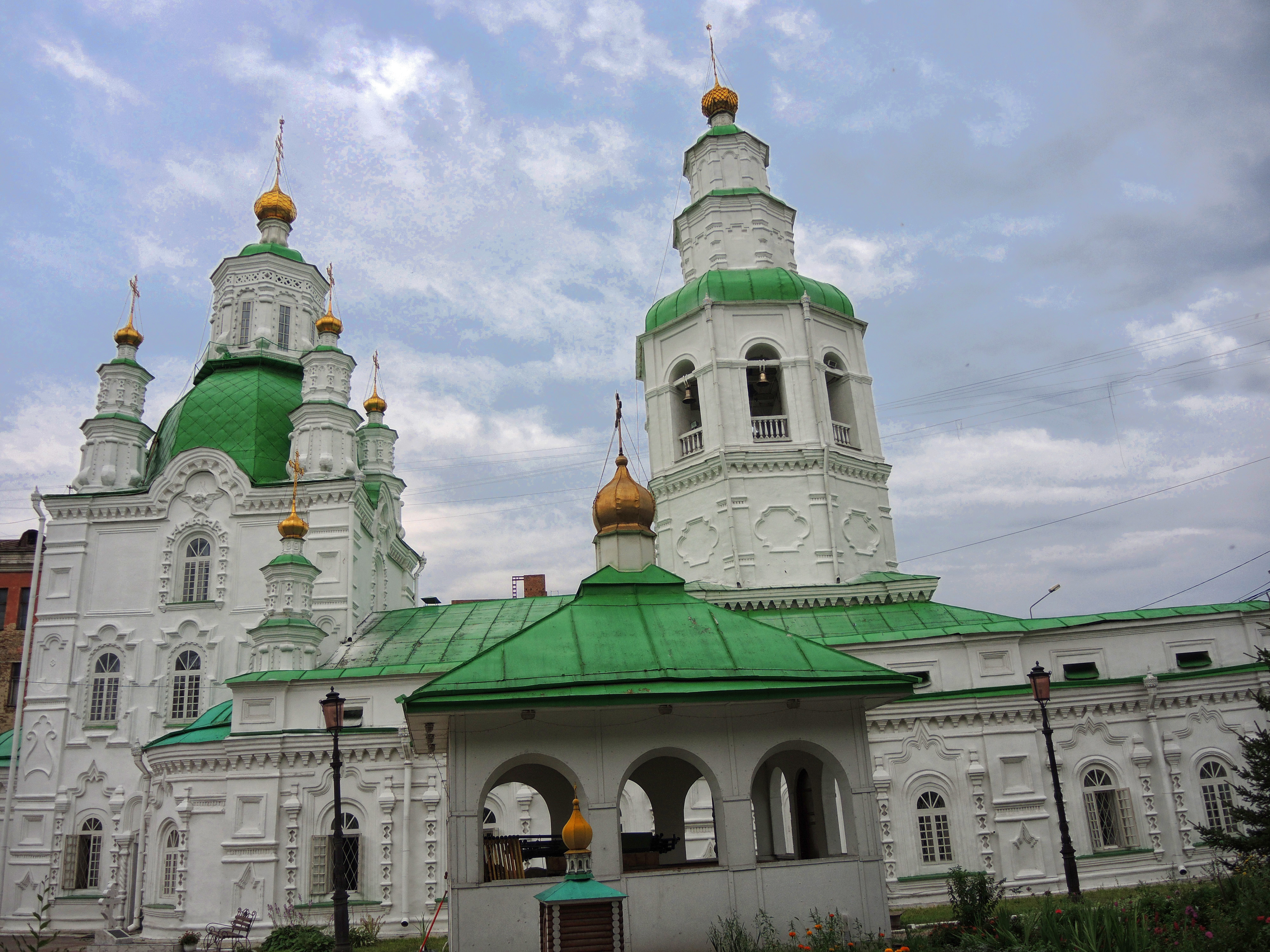
The Intercession church

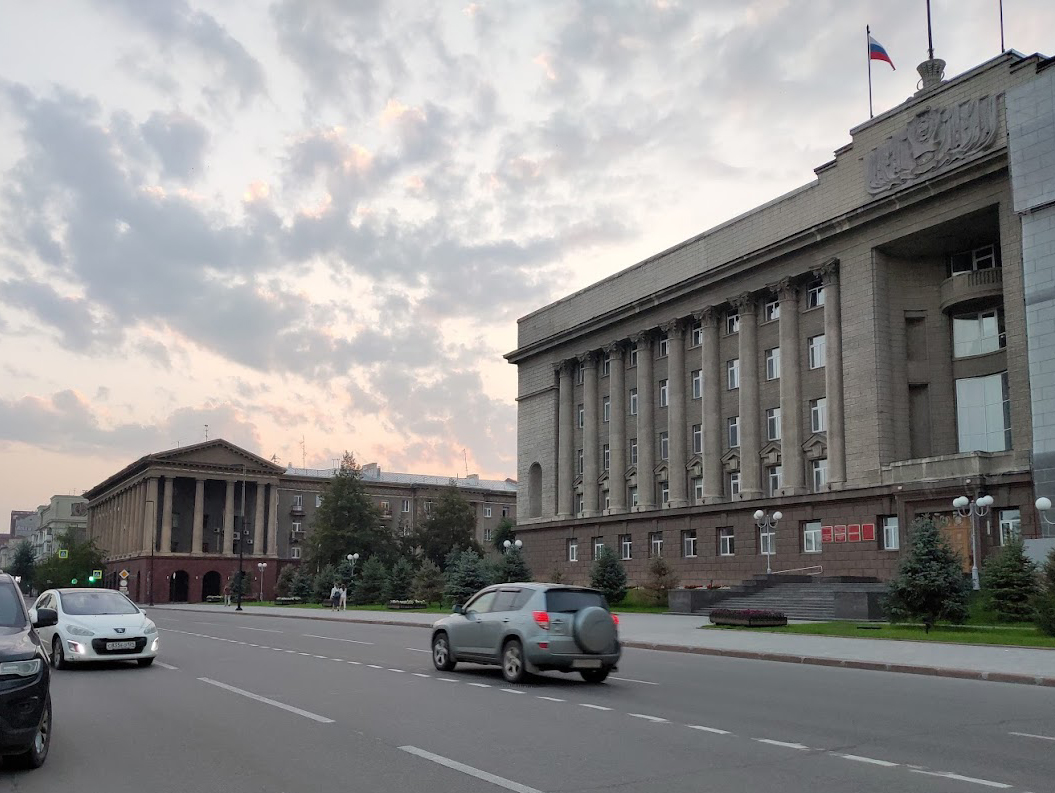
Stalinist architecture

There are a number of historical buildings in Krasnoyarsk, the oldest of them being the Intercession Cathedral (Russian: Покровский собор, 1785 to 1795, restored in 1977 to 1978). Other locally significant samples of Russian Orthodox architecture are the Annunciation Cathedral (Russian: Благовещенский собор, 1802–12), the Holy Trinity Cathedral (Russian: Свято-Троицкий собор, 1802–12), John the Baptist Church (Russian: Церковь Иоанна Предтечи, 1899, former episcopal residence), and the new Michael the Archangel Church (Russian: Церковь Архистратига Михаила, 1998 to 2003).

On the top of the Karaulnaya Hill, originally a pagan shrine, later occupied by the Krasnoyarsk fort watchtower, the Paraskeva Pyatnitsa Chapel (1804, rebuilt 1854–55) still stands. The chapel, displayed on the 10-ruble note, is one of the iconic images of the city. The chapel was abandoned and fell into disrepair during the Soviet era and only when Perestroyka came was it regained by the Yenisei bishopric.

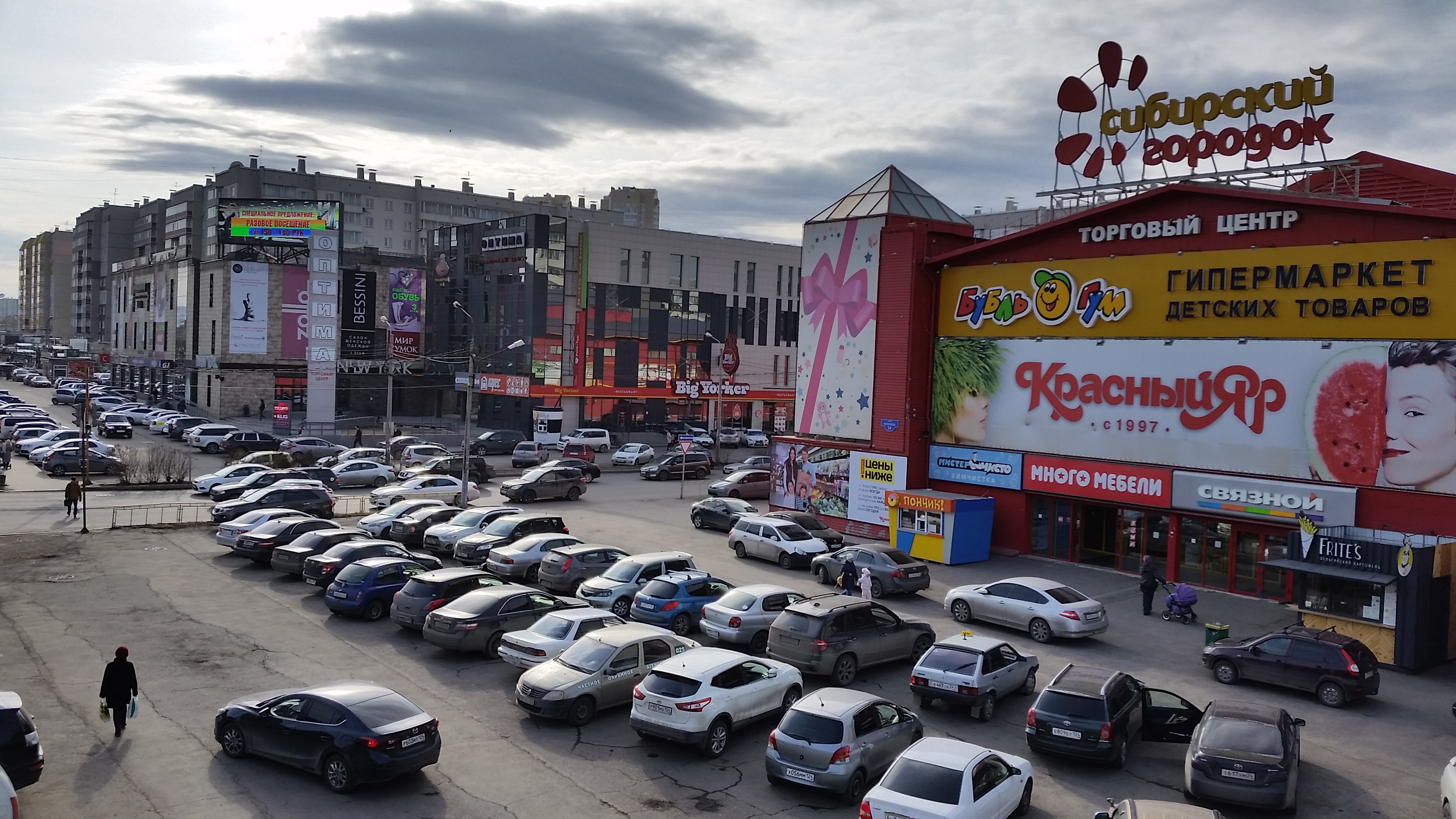
Shopping centre "Optima"

Another unofficial symbol of Krasnoyarsk is the incomplete 24-story tower located at Strelka. Construction of the tower had been started just before Perestroyka and then frozen due to the administrative crisis. The outline of the tower is clearly seen from many places in the city.

A bridge near Krasnoyarsk carries the Trans-Siberian Railway across the Yenisei. The original structure, one of the longest at the time, was constructed between 1893 and 1896 to an award-winning design by Lavr Proskuryakov. In 2003, it was rejected for emergency inscription on the World Heritage List. It was described at the time by ICOMOS "an early representation of a typical parabolic polygonal truss bridge in Russia" which became "a testing ground for the application of engineering theories and the development of new innovative solutions, which had numerous successors". The bridge was dismantled between 2002 and 2007.

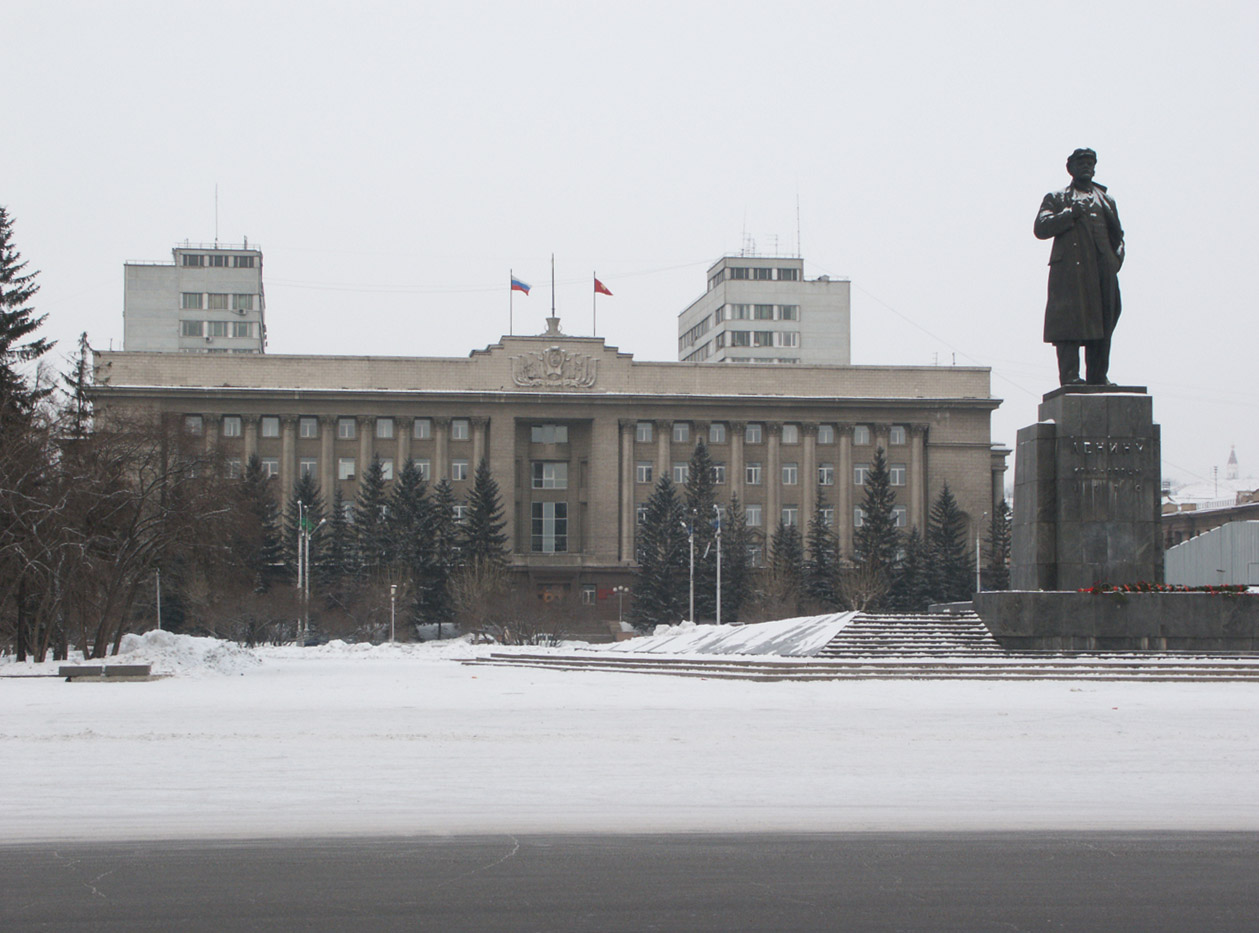
House of the Soviets, flanked by two towers known as the "Donkey Ears".

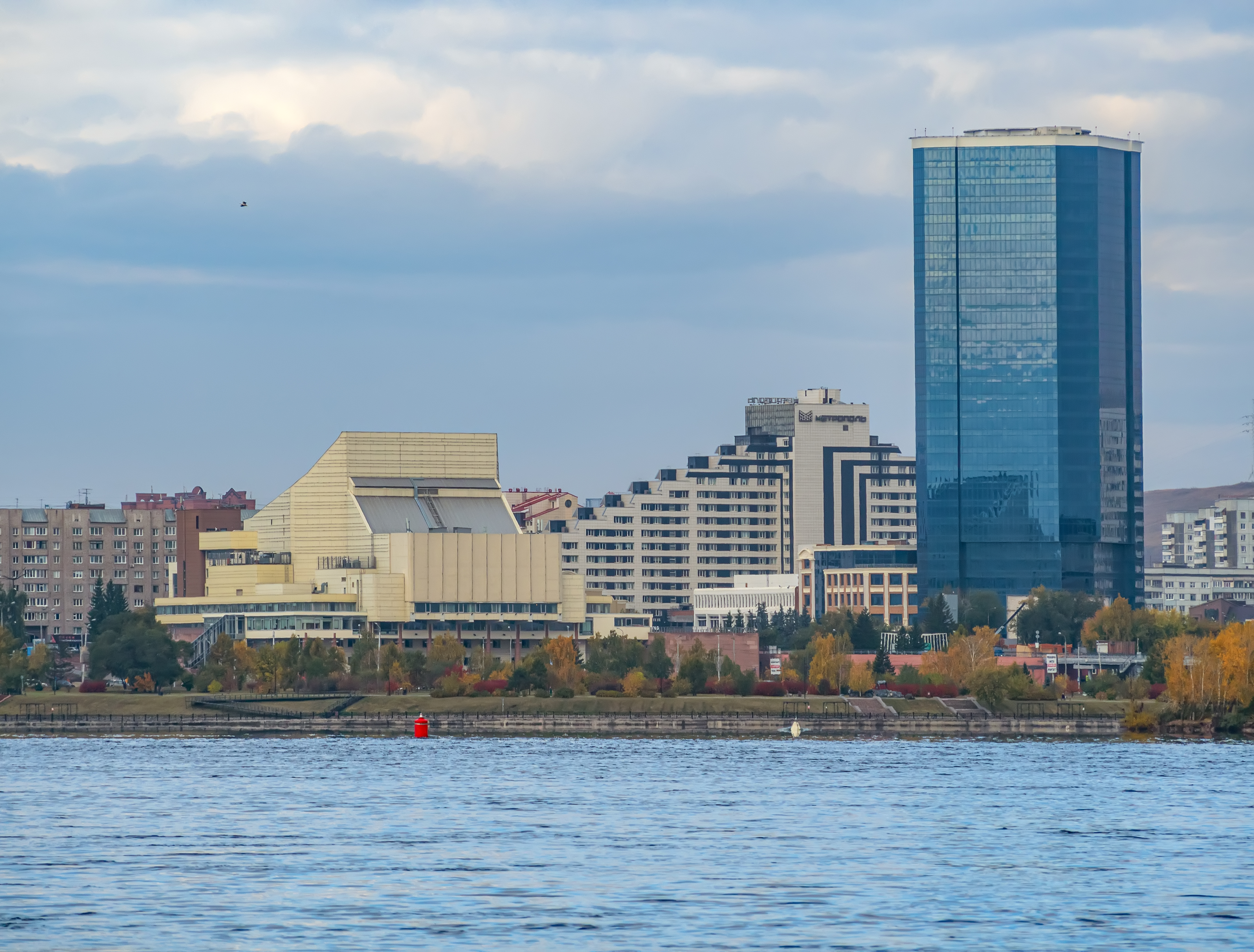
View of Strelka district from Tatyshev island

Among other notable buildings are the mansions of the merchant Nikolay Gadalov (beginning of the 20th century), the Roman Catholic Transfiguration Chapel (Russian: Преображенский собор, 1911, also known as the Krasnoyarsk Organ Hall), the Krasnoyarsk Krai Museum stylised as an Ancient Egyptian temple, the Krasnoyarsk Cultural/Historical Centre and the triumphal arch at the Spit (2003).

There are a number of two-story wooden houses in the city built mostly in the middle of the 20th century as temporary habitations. Many urbanised villages located inside the city keep the remnants of the traditional Russian village architecture: wooden houses with backyards, many somewhat dilapidated now but still inhabited.

== Culture ==
There are a number of local holidays celebrated annually in Krasnoyarsk. The most significant holiday is the Day of the City celebrated in June, usually with a carnival. Other holidays and cultural events are the Mana Festival (Russian: Манский фестиваль. The celebrations take place on the outside of town, on the bank of river Mana) usually held on the last weekend in June with the traditional bard contest, the International Museum Biennale traditionally held in the Krasnoyarsk Cultural/Historical Centre, the avant-garde Museum Night festival dedicated to the International Museum Day (18 May), the Jazz on Yenisey festival, the Stolbist Day held many times a year celebrating the traditions of mountain climbing in the Stolby Nature Reserve, and the Bikers' Rally.

Krasnoyarsk has a number of local television companies and the highly developed telecommunications, many districts of the city have LAN-based broadband Internet access.

The city is also home to the Krasnoyarsk Children's Choir, a world-renowned choir that tours in many countries as The Little Eagles of Siberia.

== Education and science ==
Next to Novosibirsk, Krasnoyarsk is a prominent scientific and educational centre of Siberia, with over 30 higher education facilities, many of which are the branches of the Russian Academy of Science, and about 200 high schools. The most notable higher education institutes are:

- Siberian Federal University (SFU), founded on 4 November 2006. The institution integrated four large higher education institutions (Krasnoyarsk State University, Krasnoyarsk State Academy of Architecture and Civil Construction, Krasnoyarsk State Technical University, State University of Non-Ferrous Metals and Gold)
- Krasnoyarsk State Pedagogical University (Russian abbreviation is KGPU), founded in 1932
- Siberian State Technological University (Russian abbreviation is SibGTU), the oldest in the city, founded in 1930 as the Siberian Institute of Forest
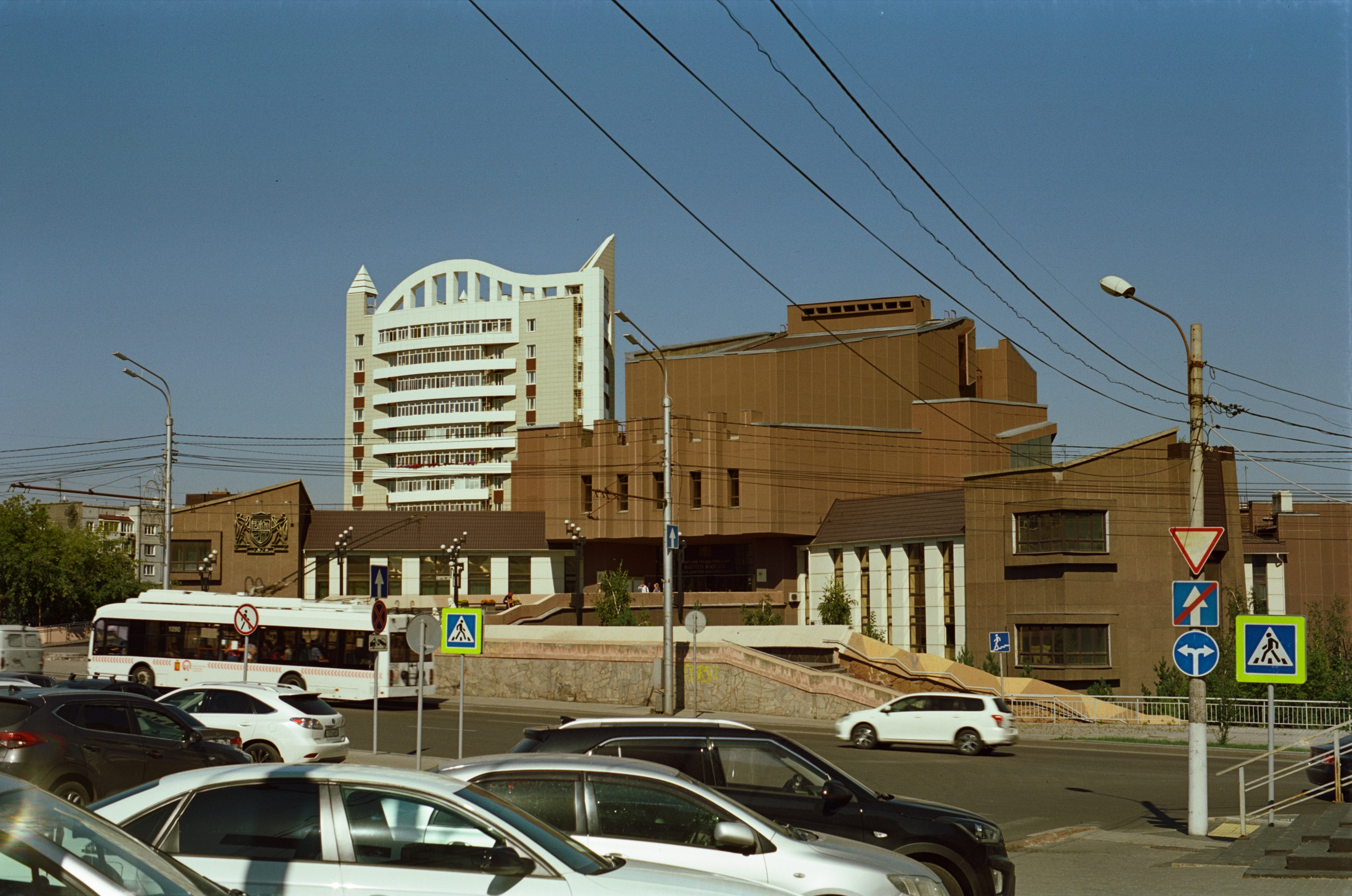
  Siberian Arts institute
- Siberian State Aerospace University (Russian abbreviation is SibGAU), founded in 1960
- Krasnoyarsk State Medical University (Russian abbreviation is KrasGMU), founded in 1942
- Krasnoyarsk State Agrarian University (Russian abbreviation is Krasnoyarsk GAU), founded in 1952

Like Novosibirsk, Krasnoyarsk has a special city district called Akademgorodok ("Academic Town"), where several scientific research institutes are located. Krasnoyarsk's Institute of Biophysics is known for a 1973–1985 experiment on ecological isolation of human beings (the "Bios Experiment"). Sukachev Institute of Forest, founded in 1944 at Moscow and relocated to Krasnoyarsk in 1959. There are several museums in Krasnoyarsk. One is the Krasnoyarsk Regional Museum, containing historical items and exhibits of the region, including ancient history, native Siberians, and woolly rhinos.

The Krasnoyarsk zoo is also a major attraction for residents and tourists.

== Transportation ==
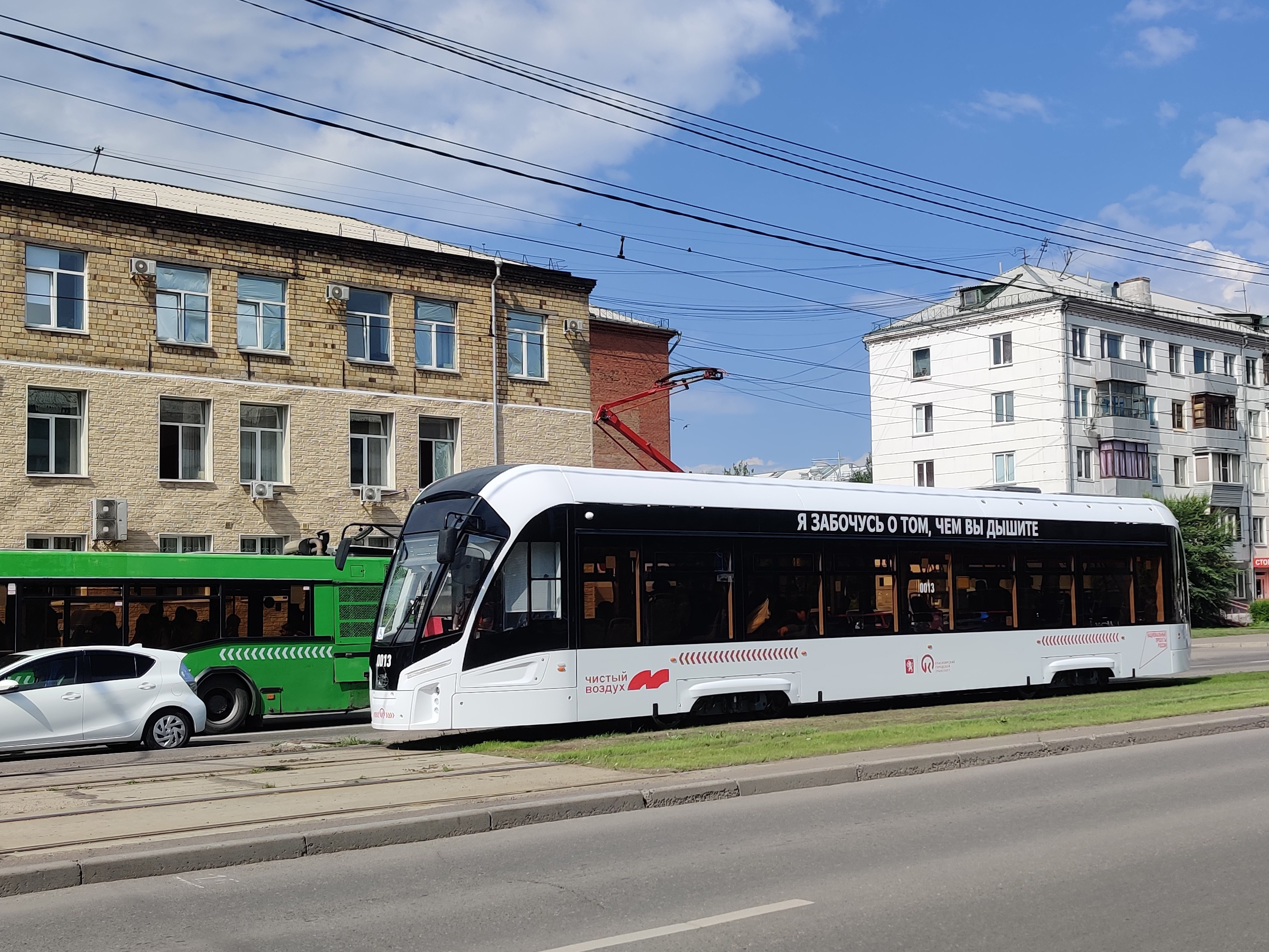
Tram in Krasnoyarsk

=== Public transportation ===
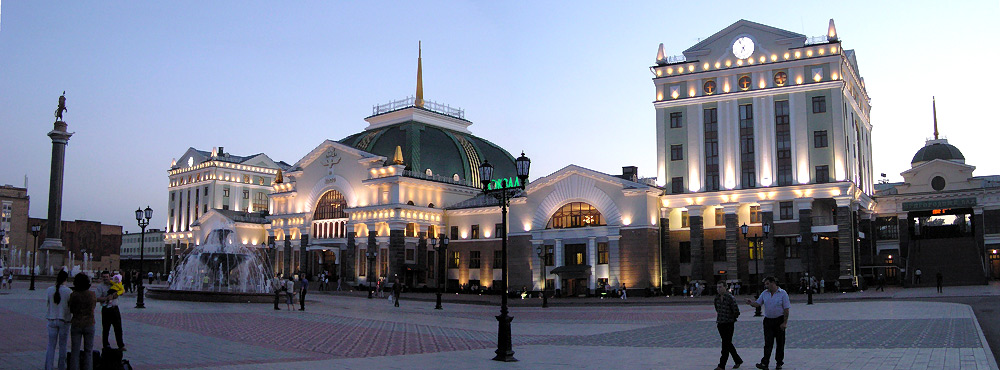
Krasnoyarsk rail station

Map of trolleybus routes

The transit system is dominated by buses, but there also are several trolleybus and tram routes.

An underground metro system (three lines) has been in planning and construction phases in Krasnoyarsk for decades. Subway construction was terminated in 2008. In 2021, a decision was made to use tunnels to create a light rail system, and construction resumed in 2023.

=== Railway ===
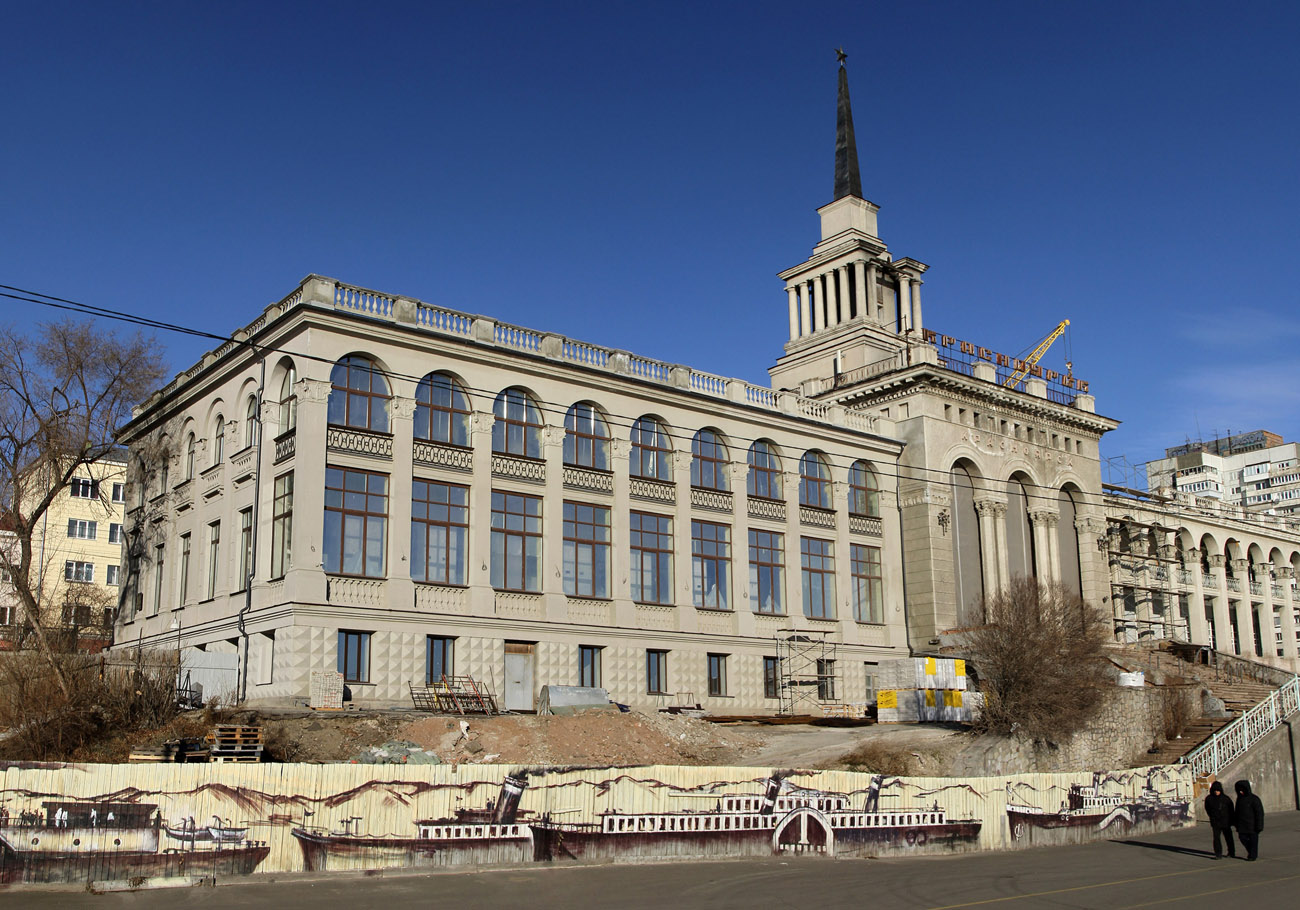
Krasnoyarsk Riverport.

Krasnoyarsk lies on the Yenisei River and historically has been an important junction on the Trans-Siberian Railway. Krasnoyarsk-Passazhirsky (Russian: Красноярск-Пассажирский, lit. Krasnoyarsk-Passenger) is the main railway station of Krasnoyarsk. Long-range trains of the Trans-Siberian Railway stop at this station. There are some stations served by Elektrichka and there is Krasnoyarsk-East goods station 26.3km east of Krasnoyarsk-Passazhirsky.

=== Airports ===
Krasnoyarsk was served by two airports: Yemelyanovo Airport is the main airport and handles both medium and long-haul domestic as well as international flights, and is 27 km (17 mi) northwest of the city. The secondary Cheremshanka Airport handled short-haul flights. Cheremshanka has lost its eminent role as the main base airport for an extensive network of local air services (MVL) in Krasnoyarsk Krai formerly served by the local Aeroflot Krasnoyarsk Directorate. In December 2011, a fire broke out at the Cheremshanka airport which destroyed the terminal building and the air traffic control tower.

== Tourism ==
The most popular place of attraction for tourists visiting Krasnoyarsk is the huge national nature reserve Stolby ("pillars"), which covers an area of 470 km^{2} (180 sq mi) with numerous giant granite rocks formations up to 100 meters high, many of very extraordinary shapes. Stolby is also a major rock climbing location. Many local climbers intentionally do not use any belaying equipment and call their extreme sport stolbizm, known elsewhere as solo climbing.

Other popular showplaces include the Krasnoyarsk Hydroelectric Power Station dam, the Karaulnaya Gora hill with the Paraskeva Pyatnitsa Chapel, museums, theatres, etc.

== Sports ==
Krasnoyarsk is a centre of Siberian sports. Areas, where Krasnoyarsk excels compared to other Russian cities, include rugby union, bandy, and freestyle wrestling.

Yenisey was the Soviet bandy champions every year in the 1980s as well as in 1991. The first Russian title came in 2001. In 2014, they became champions of the Bandy Super League and had the highest average attendance (5747). In 2015 the league title was won again as well as in 2016. At the 2019 Winter Universiade, hosted by Krasnoyarsk, bandy was included in the sports programme for the first time in the history of the event. The Yenisey Ice Stadium, which hosted bandy games, was built for the Winter Universiade 2019. Other sports venues built or reconstructed for the Universiade included the Crystal Ice Arena, Platinum Arena, Arena Sever, Ivan Yarygin Sports Palace and Central Stadium.

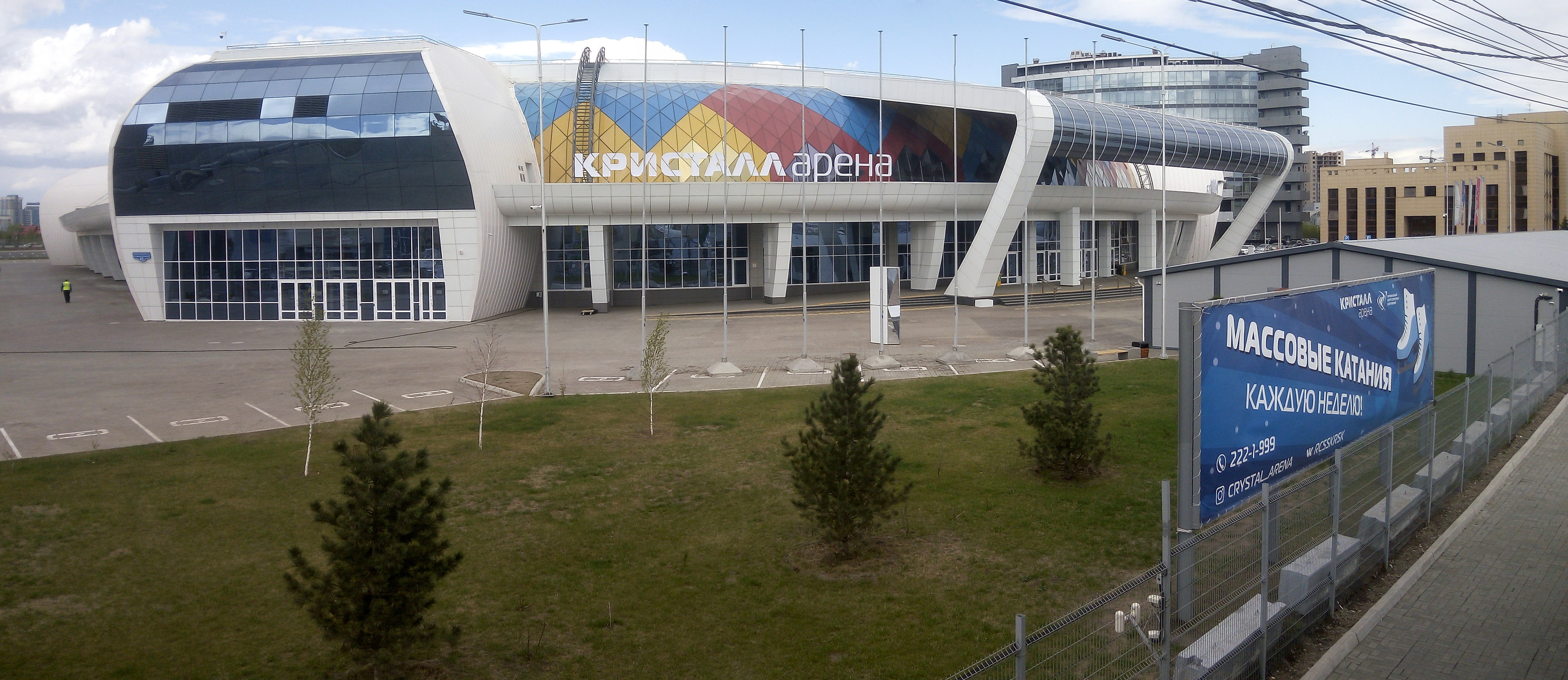
Crystal Arena, Krasnoyarsk

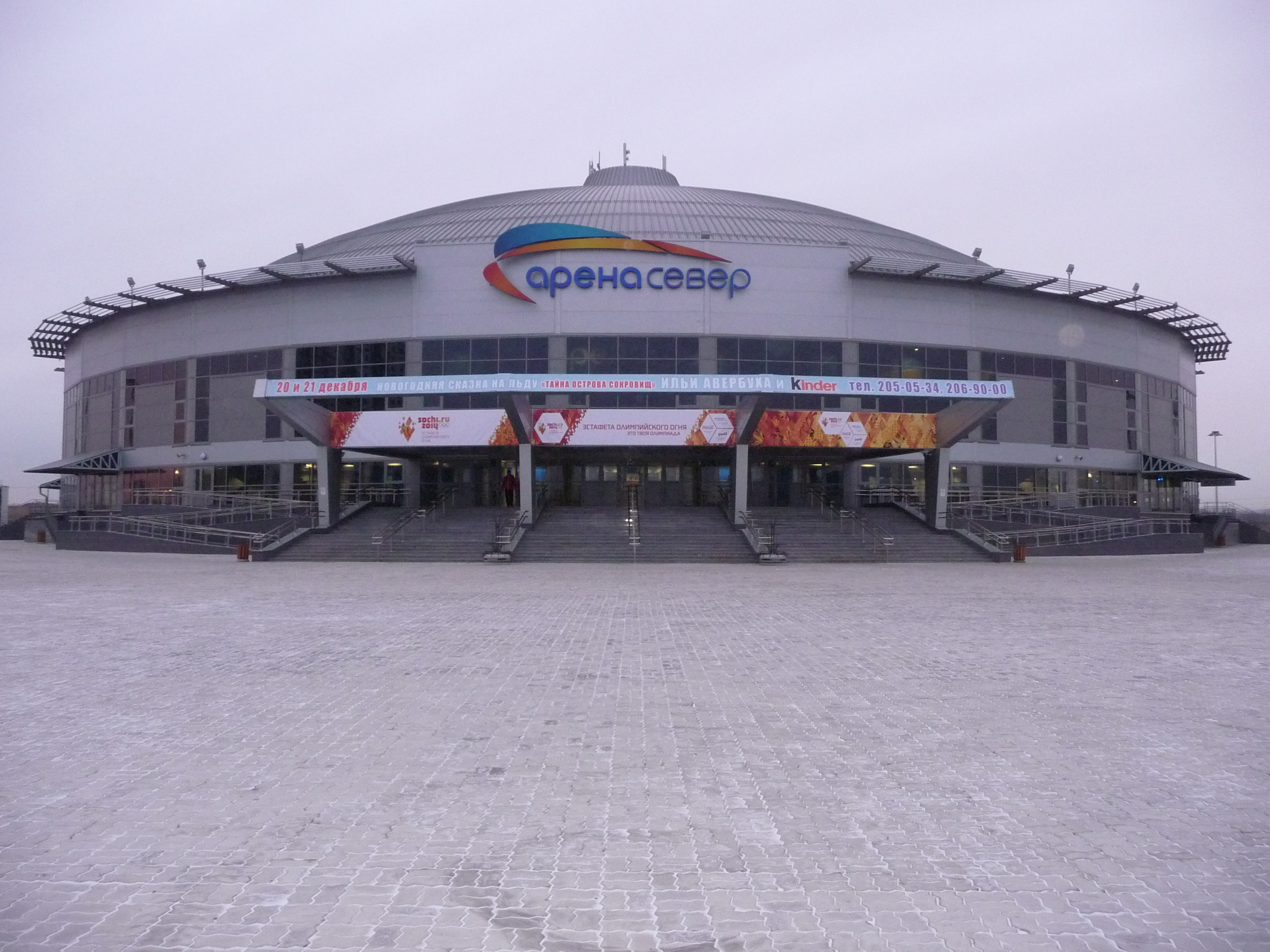
Arena Sever

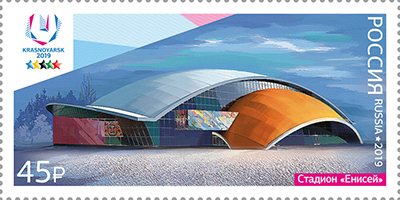
Yenisey Stadium

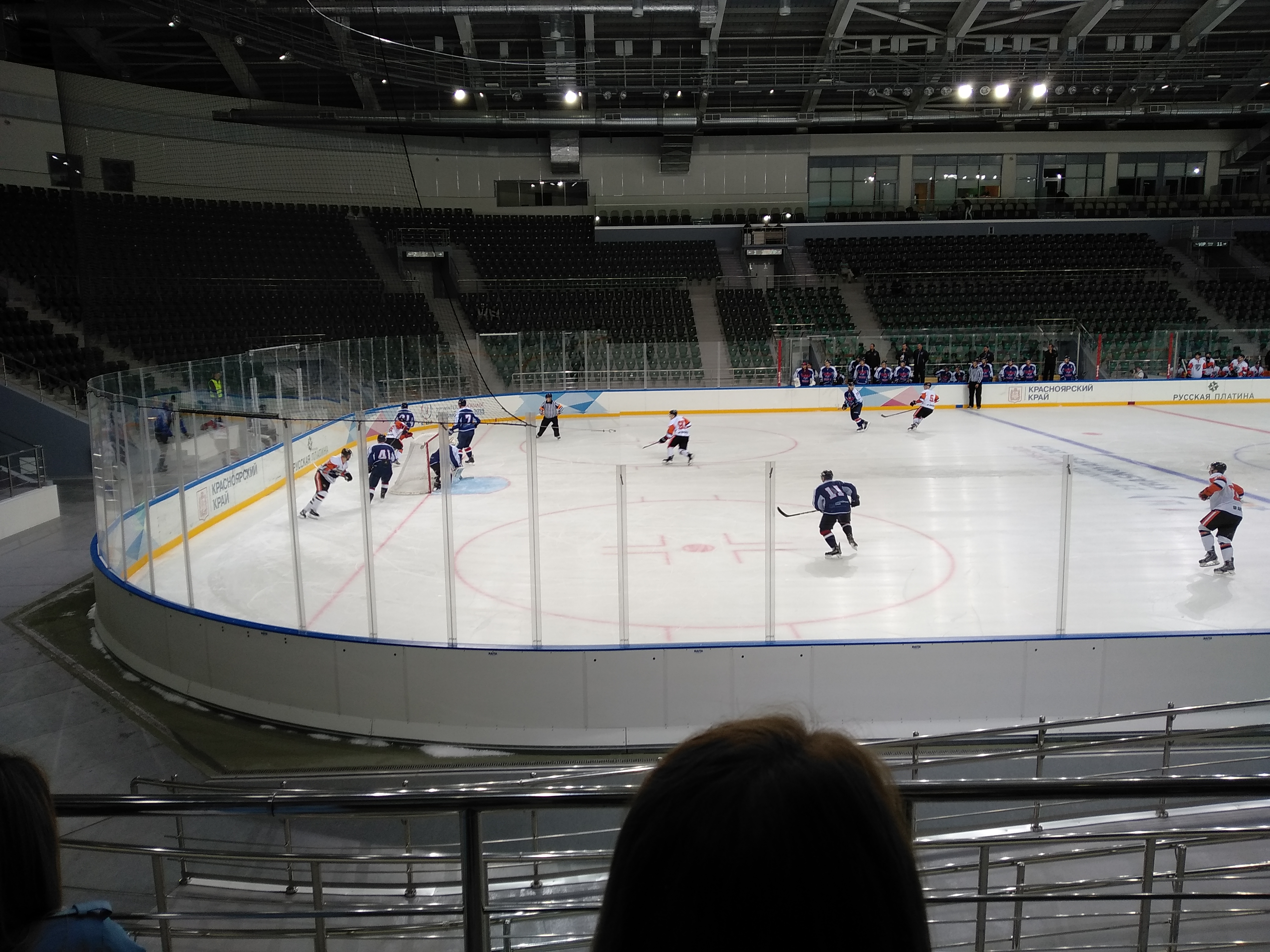
Platinum Arena Krasnoyarsk

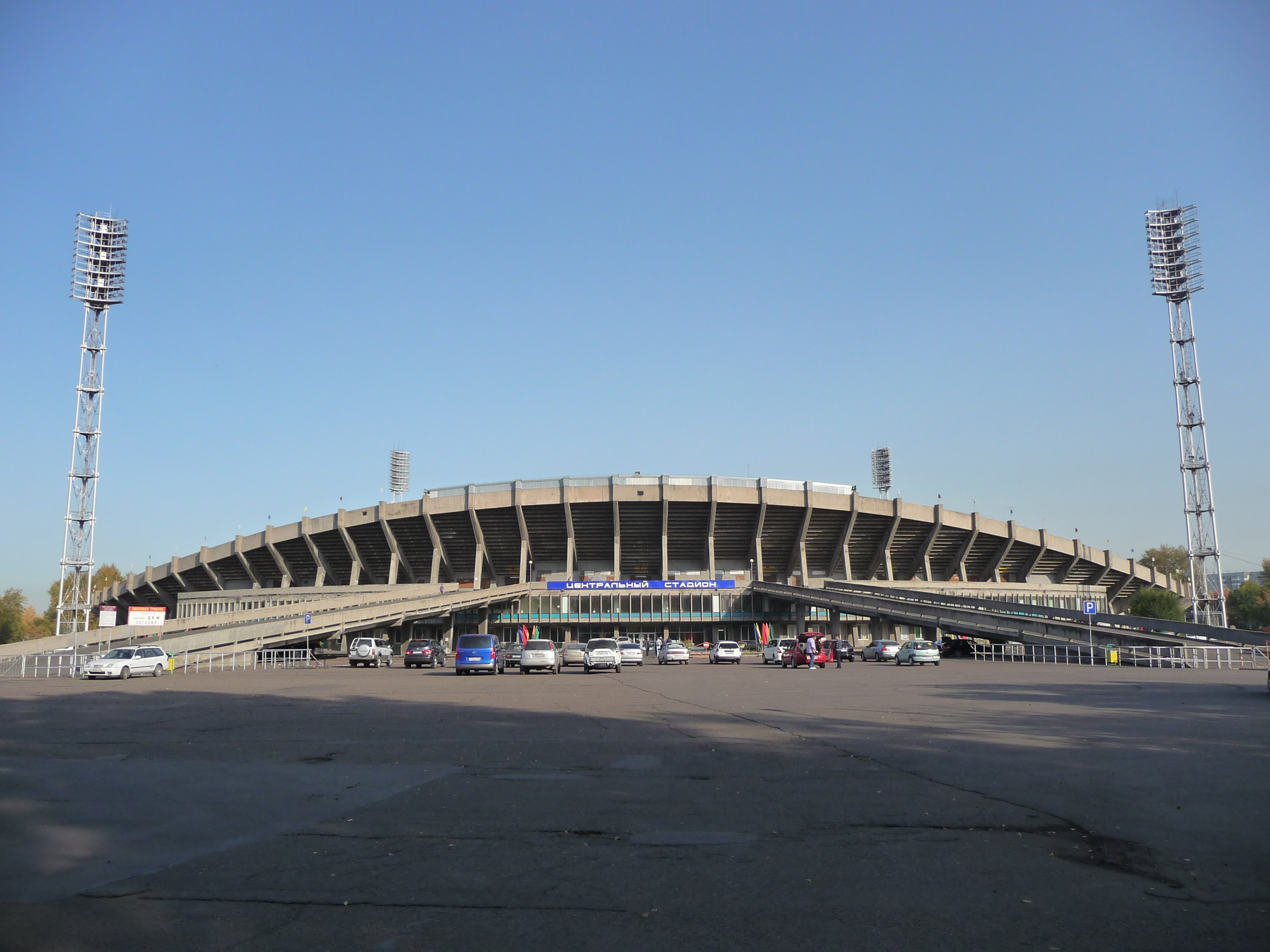
Central Stadium of Krasnoyarsk

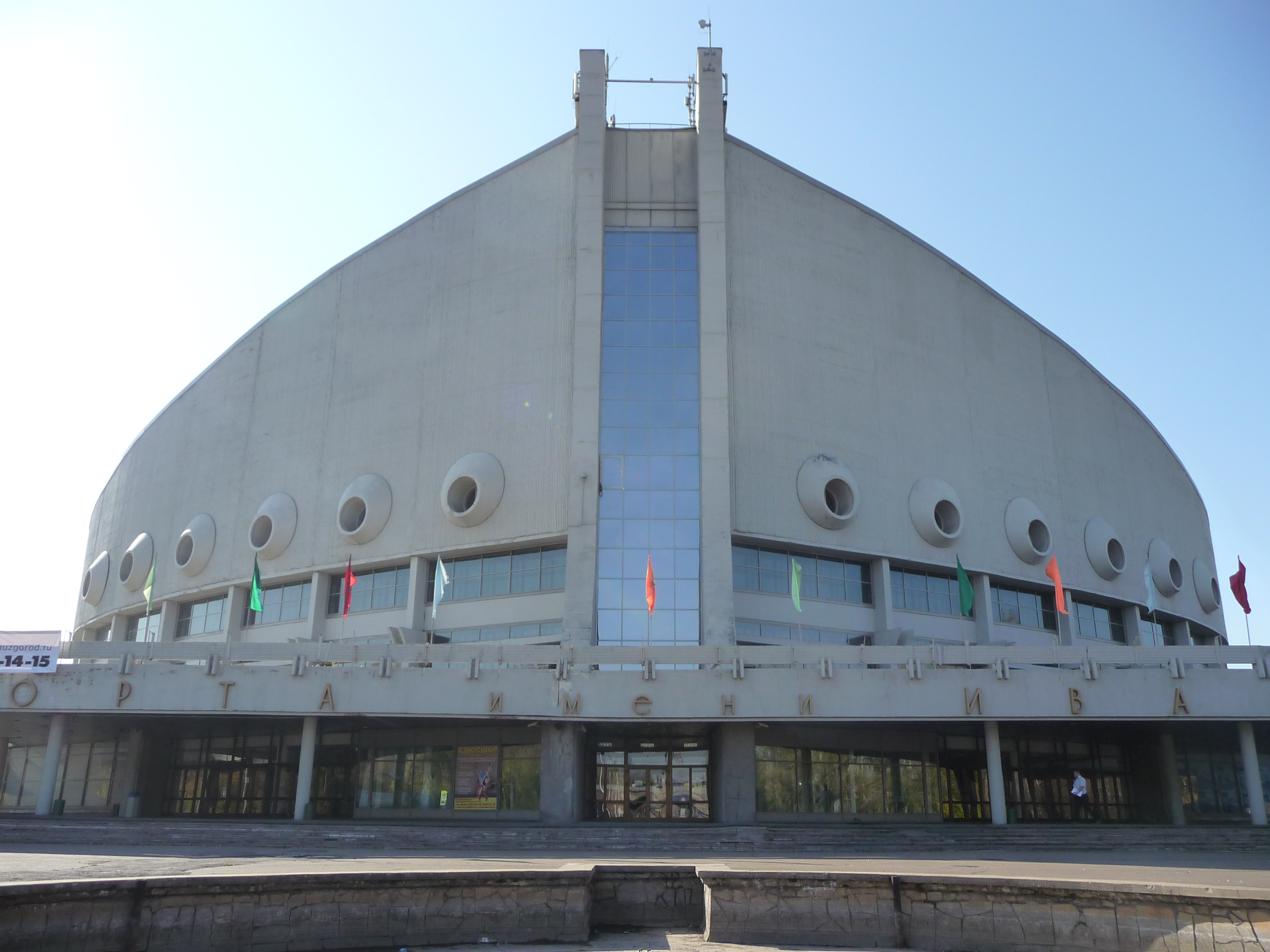
Ivan Yarygin Sports Palace

The city is considered a stronghold of rugby union in Russia, to the extent that the Rugby Union of Russia was headquartered locally for many years. Two Krasnoyarsk clubs, Krasny Yar and Enisey-STM, participate in Russia's top rugby union competition. Both clubs have also represented Russian rugby in European rugby club competitions, including the European Rugby Challenge Cup, the second-tier pan-European club competition before Russian teams were suspended from international and cross-border rugby competitions in 2022. Matches take precedence in the local media, and the city derby match can attract crowds of about 3000–5000. Many players of the Russian national rugby team hail from the area. Some of Russia's international rugby matches are played at the Central Stadium.

Club	Sport	Founded	Current league	Tier	Stadium
Yenisey Krasnoyarsk	Football	1937	Russian First League	2nd	Central Stadium
Sokol Krasnoyarsk	Ice Hockey	1977	Higher Hockey League	2nd	Arena Sever
Yenisey Krasnoyarsk	Bandy	1934	Bandy Super League	1st	Yenisey Stadium
BC Enisey	Basketball	1993	VTB United League	1st	Arena Sever
Krasny Yar	Rugby Union	1969	Professional Rugby League	1st	Krasny Yar Stadium
Enisey-STM	Rugby Union	1975	Professional Rugby League	1st	Avangard Stadium
Yenisey Krasnoyarsk	Volleyball	1992	Women's Volleyball Super League	1st	Dvorkin Sports House
Yenisey Krasnoyarsk	Volleyball	1993	Volleyball Supreme League A	2nd	Dvorkin Sports House

Former Carolina Hurricanes left winger Alexander Semin is from Krasnoyarsk.

Krasnoyarsk hosts the Ivan Yarygin international wrestling tournament.

=== Sport events ===
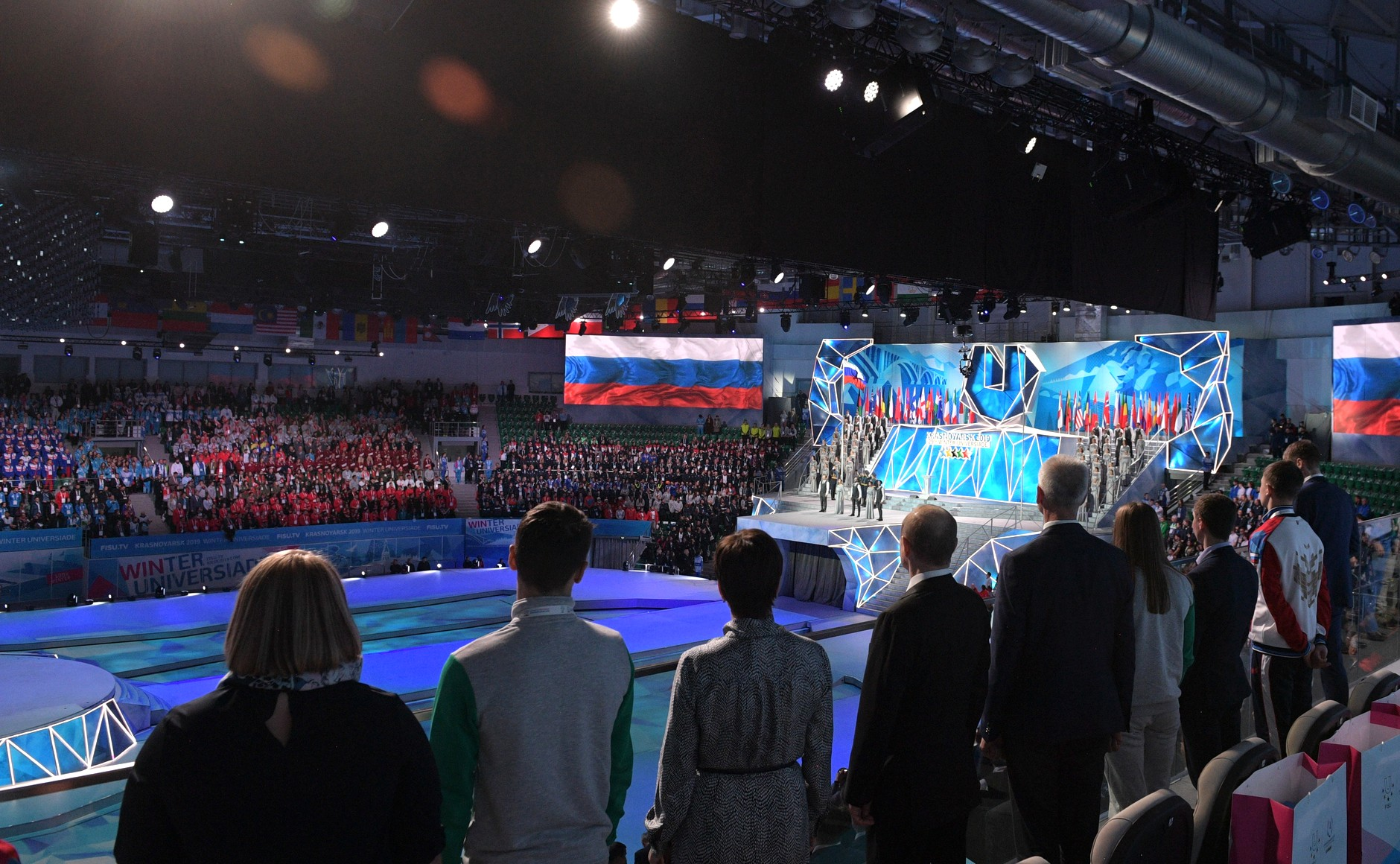
Opening Ceremony of the 2019 Winter Universiade

Krasnoyarsk hosted the 2019 Winter Universiade from 2 to 12 March 2019.

== Notable people ==
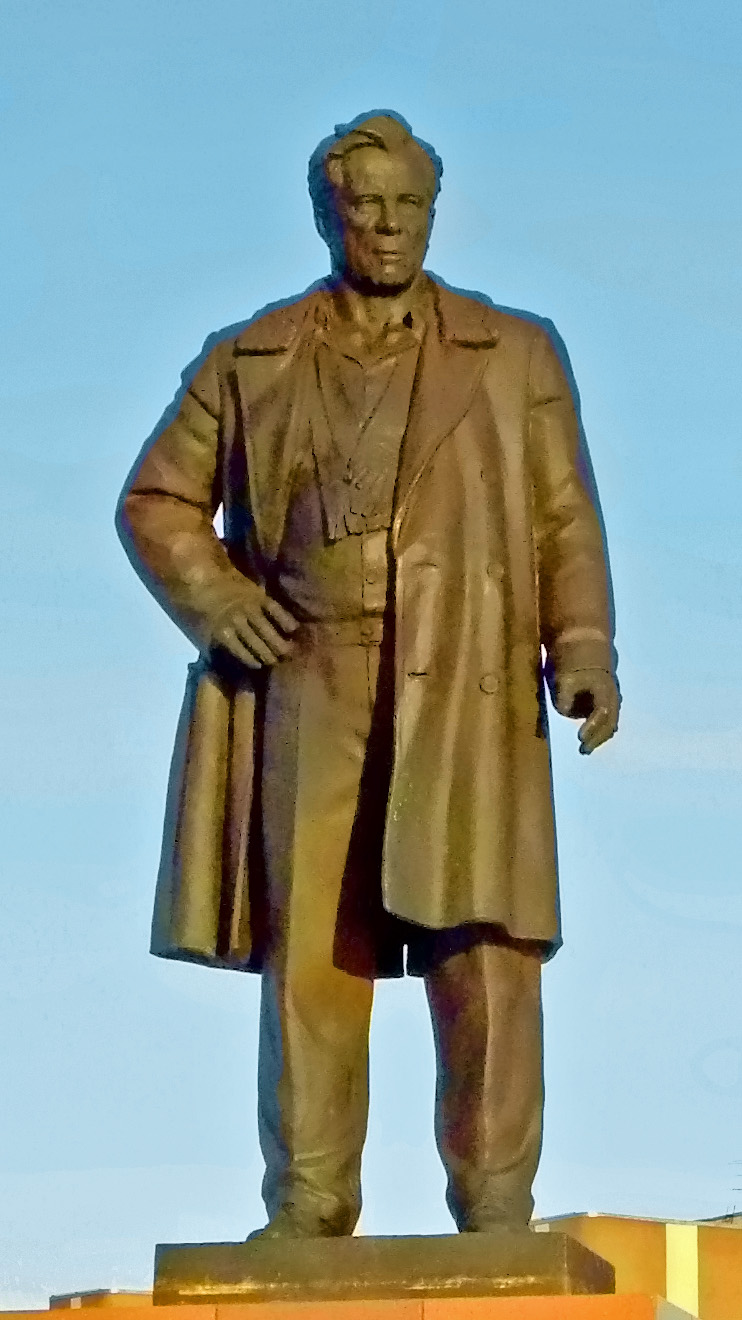
Monument to Viktor Astafyev

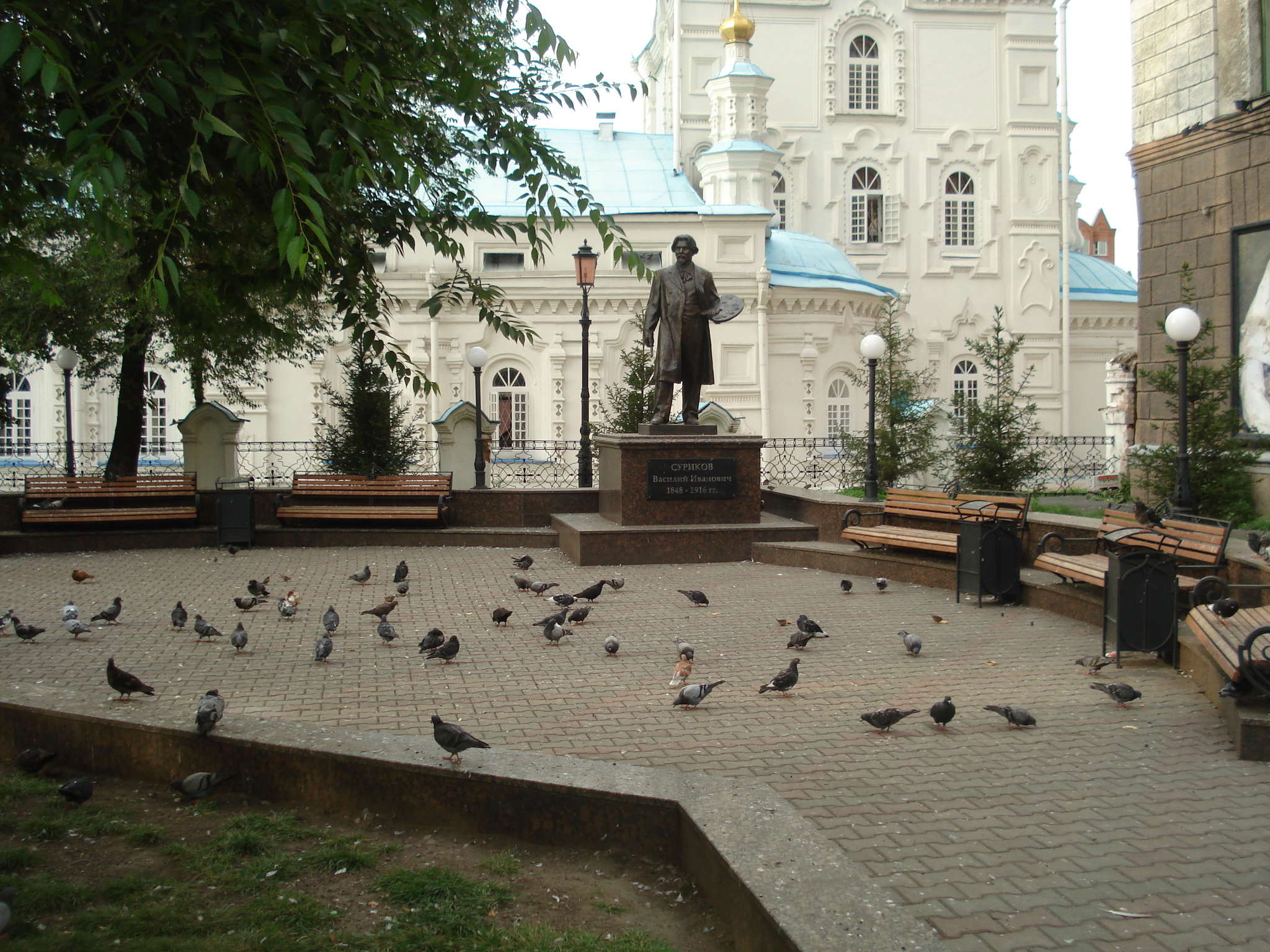
Monument to Vasily Surikov

- Mirra Andreeva, tennis player
- Viktor Astafyev, writer
- Vyacheslav Butusov, singer and songwriter
- Caziel, artist
- Walter Ciszek, Polish-American Jesuit priest held captive here on suspicion of espionage for the Vatican
- Valentin Danilov, Russian scientist
- Elena Abramovna Davidovich, numismatist and archaeologist
- Yekaterina Duntsova, Russian politician, journalist and lawyer
- Helene Fischer, German singer and actress
- Iya Gavrilova, ice hockey player
- Arseni Gritsyuk, ice hockey player
- Dmitri Hvorostovsky, operatic baritone
- Evgeny Isakov, ice hockey player
- Elena Khrustaleva, biathlete
- Svetlana Khustik, journalist
- Sergey Ivanovich Lomanov, bandy manager and former player
- Sergey Sergeyevich Lomanov, bandy player
- Andreï Makine, novelist
- Armen Petrosyan, mixed martial artist
- Yevgeni Popov, writer
- Sofia Samodurova, figure skater
- Alexander Semin, ice hockey player
- Andrei Shepelenko, professional ice hockey player
- Pyotr Slovtsov, opera singer
- Vasily Surikov, historic painter
- Viktoria Tereshkina, prima ballerina
- Viktor Tretiakov, violinist
- Evgeny Ustyugov, biathlete

== Twin towns – sister cities ==
Krasnoyarsk is twinned with:

- Heihe, China (1999)
- Istaravshan, Tajikistan (2000)
- Sault Ste. Marie, Canada (2002)
- Ulaanbaatar, Mongolia (2003)
- Samarkand, Uzbekistan (2003)
- Oneonta, United States (2004)
- Cremona, Italy (2006)
- Žilina, Slovakia (2013)
- Changchun, China (2014)
- Manzhouli, China (2017)

=== Cooperation agreements ===
Krasnoyarsk has cooperation agreements with:

- Kokshetau, Kazakhstan (2022)
