= Akademmistechko =

Akademmistechko (Ukrainian: Академмiстечко) is a Ukrainian name which may refer to:

- Akademmistechko (Kyiv Metro), a station on the Kyiv Metro
- Akademmistechko (Kyiv), a neighbourhood in Kyiv, the capital of Ukraine
- Academical town, meaning the neighbourhood surrounding the National Academy of Sciences of Ukraine

== See also ==
- Akademgorodok (disambiguation)
