= Krasnoyarsk Pillars =

National park in Krasnoyarsk Krai, Russia

Krasnoyarsk Stolby National Park
- IUCN category II (national park)
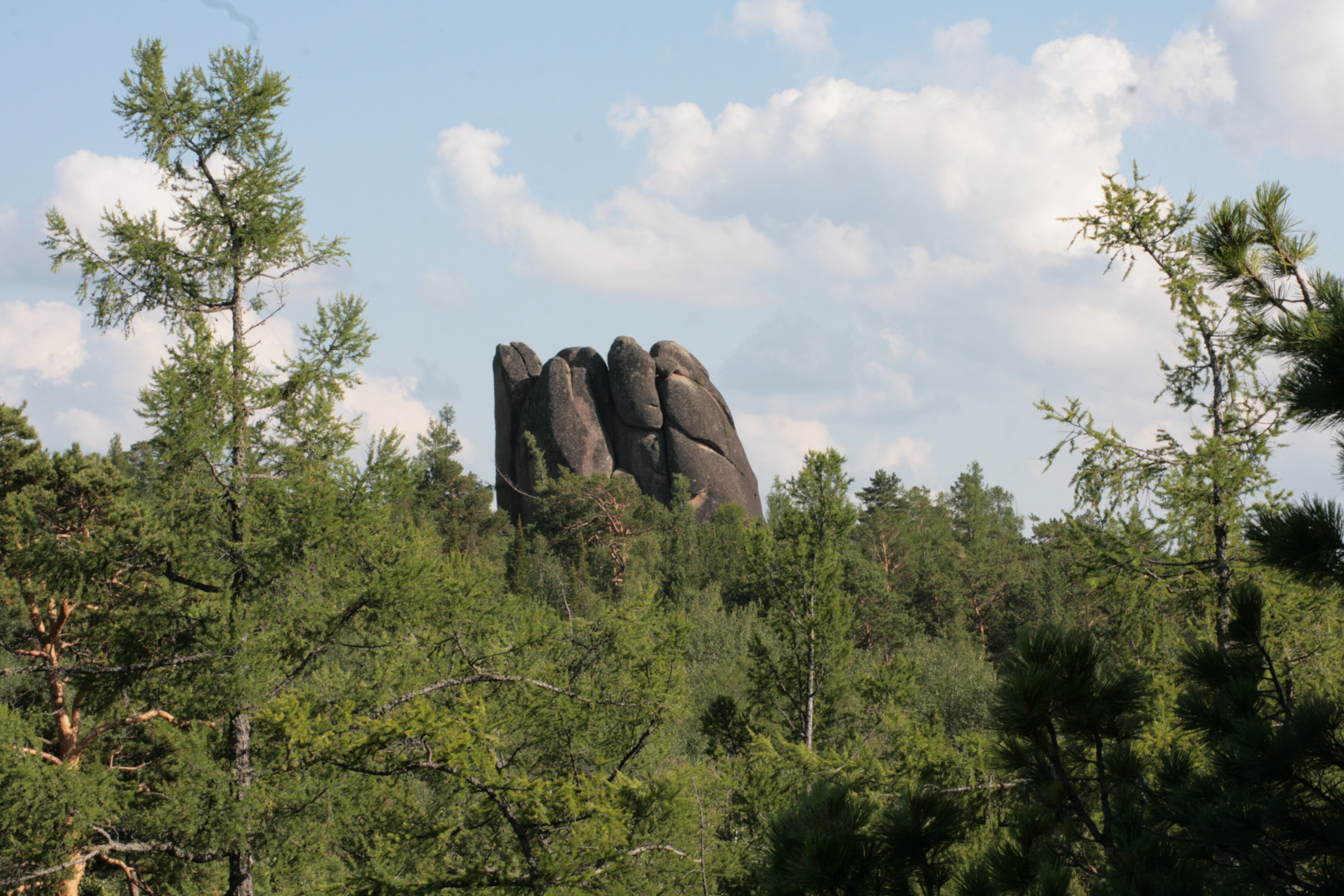

- Location within Russia
- Location: Krasnoyarsk Krai, Russia
- Nearest city: Krasnoyarsk
- Coordinates: 55°32′N 92°28′E
- Area: 47,154 ha (182.06 sq mi)
- Website: www.zapovednik-stolby.ru

Krasnoyarsk Pillars (also known as Stolby) (Russian: Национа́льный парк «Красноя́рские Столбы́») is a Russian national park located 10 km south of the city of Krasnoyarsk, on the northwestern spurs of the Eastern Sayan Mountains. The site is known for its dramatic rock formations. Over 200,000 climbers, hikers, and other visitors are recorded annually. The park covers 47,219 hectares.

== Topography ==
The park's natural borders are the Bazaikha River, a right tributary of the Yenisei River, in the northeast; the Mana River in the south; and the Bolshaya Slizneva River in the southwest. To the northeast, the park borders the city of Krasnoyarsk. The park is divided into two regions. The first is straight Stolby, which is open to tourists. The second is "Wild Stolby", which is located deeper the park, and where access is restricted.

== Ecoregion and climate ==
Stolby is located in the East Siberian taiga ecoregion, in the heart of Siberia.

The climate is subarctic, without dry season (Köppen climate classification, Dfc). This climate is characterized by mild summers and cold, snowy winters.

Climate data for Krasnoyarsk (the nearest settlement)
Month	Jan	Feb	Mar	Apr	May	Jun	Jul	Aug	Sep	Oct	Nov	Dec	Year
Record high °C (°F)	6.0 (42.8)	8.5 (47.3)	18.5 (65.3)	31.4 (88.5)	34.0 (93.2)	34.8 (94.6)	36.4 (97.5)	35.1 (95.2)	31.3 (88.3)	24.5 (76.1)	13.6 (56.5)	8.6 (47.5)	36.4 (97.5)
Mean daily maximum °C (°F)	−11.6 (11.1)	−7.5 (18.5)	0.7 (33.3)	9.3 (48.7)	17.1 (62.8)	23.5 (74.3)	25.2 (77.4)	22.2 (72.0)	14.6 (58.3)	6.7 (44.1)	−3.6 (25.5)	−9.3 (15.3)	7.3 (45.1)
Daily mean °C (°F)	−15.6 (3.9)	−12.3 (9.9)	−4.9 (23.2)	3.4 (38.1)	10.4 (50.7)	16.9 (62.4)	19.1 (66.4)	16.1 (61.0)	9.1 (48.4)	2.3 (36.1)	−7.3 (18.9)	−13.2 (8.2)	2.0 (35.6)
Mean daily minimum °C (°F)	−19.2 (−2.6)	−16.3 (2.7)	−9.4 (15.1)	−1.4 (29.5)	4.7 (40.5)	11.1 (52.0)	13.7 (56.7)	11.2 (52.2)	5.0 (41.0)	−1.3 (29.7)	−10.7 (12.7)	−16.9 (1.6)	−2.5 (27.5)
Record low °C (°F)	−52.8 (−63.0)	−41.6 (−42.9)	−38.7 (−37.7)	−25.7 (−14.3)	−11.2 (11.8)	−3.6 (25.5)	3.3 (37.9)	−1.0 (30.2)	−9.6 (14.7)	−25.1 (−13.2)	−42.3 (−44.1)	−47.0 (−52.6)	−52.8 (−63.0)
Average precipitation mm (inches)	17 (0.7)	15 (0.6)	19 (0.7)	29 (1.1)	48 (1.9)	66 (2.6)	70 (2.8)	76 (3.0)	55 (2.2)	42 (1.7)	39 (1.5)	31 (1.2)	507 (20.0)
Average extreme snow depth cm (inches)	16 (6.3)	16 (6.3)	13 (5.1)	3 (1.2)	0 (0)	0 (0)	0 (0)	0 (0)	0 (0)	2 (0.8)	7 (2.8)	14 (5.5)	16 (6.3)
Average rainy days	0.3	0.4	2	9	17	19	18	18	19	13	4	0.3	120
Average snowy days	24	21	17	14	4	0.1	0	0.03	2	14	23	25	144
Average relative humidity (%)	73	70	64	58	54	64	72	76	75	71	74	73	69
Mean monthly sunshine hours	63	100	171	216	251	280	281	237	160	111	58	41	1,969
Source 1: Pogoda.ru.net
Source 2: NOAA (sun only 1961–1990)

== Flora and fauna ==
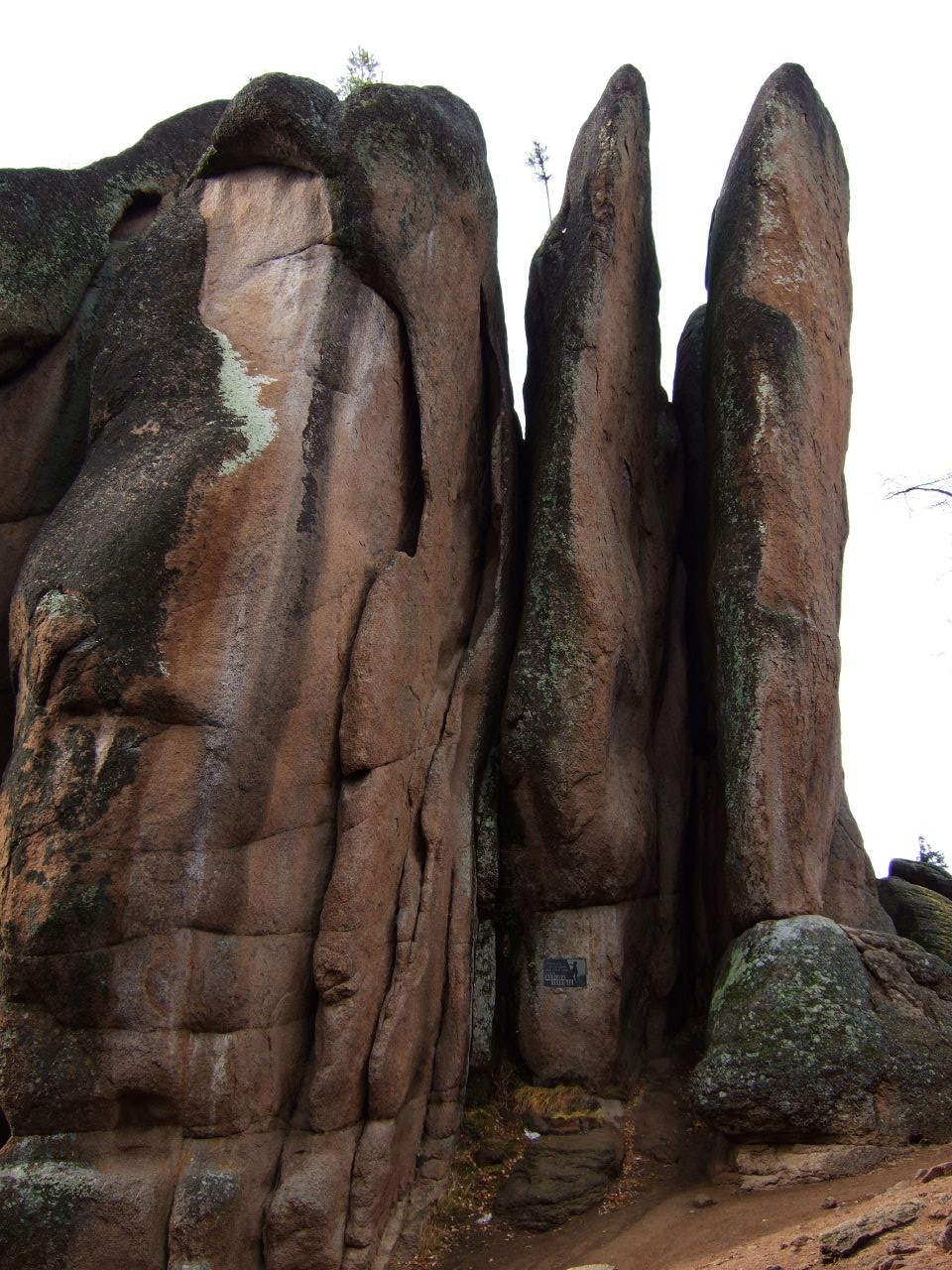
The "Feathers" rock formation

Flora of the national park includes about 740 vascular plants and 260 kinds of mosses. Fir taiga, which is typical for the midlands of the Eastern Sayan, prevails. 290 species of vertebrates are found in the territory of the park, including many with a taiga habitat, (red-backed mouse, sable, Siberian musk deer, hazel grouse and others), as well as some forest-steppe animals (Siberian roe deer, steppe polecat, long-tailed ground squirrel and others).

Also, there are species from The Red Book of Russia:

- Plants: calypso bulbosa, cypripedium calceolus, dactylorhiza majalis, orchis militaris, stipa pennata et al.
- Birds: osprey, golden eagle, saker falcon, peregrine falcon and others.

== Ecotourism and access ==
Visitors are able to get to the boundary of the park by city bus. The main attraction of the park is the rocks; the collective name of the rocks is Stolby, although all of the large formations, and even some smaller stones, have their own names. Inhabitants of Krasnoyarsk have been visiting Stolby for more than 150 years for sport and adventure holidays.

Three districts are accessible to tourists:

- Takmakovsky district is situated in a valley of the Bazaikha River, at the foot of the Takmak rock. Rocks in this area include: Kitayskaya Stenka, Yermak and a group of small rocks: Vorobushki, Tsypa, Zhaba.
- Central pillars is a district 7 kilometers from the boundary of the reserve, occupying an area of about 5x10 kilometers. Unique rocks such as Ded ("Grandfather"), Perja ("Plumage"), and Lvinnyj vorota ("Lions Gate"), as well as a group of pillars, are located here. The most popular routes to the top of rocks are Golubye Katushki ("Blue Coils") and Dymokhod ("Stovepipe"). Stolbists say that Bolsheviks wrote the word "Svoboda" (en. Freedom) on the biggest pillar before the October Revolution. Nowadays enthusiasts renew the writing intermittently, and because of difficulty of the ascent, law enforcement cannot erase the inscription.
- Wild pillars include the rocks Manskaya Stenka and Manskaya Baba, which are situated in a buffer zone (closed for free visit).

== History of exploration ==
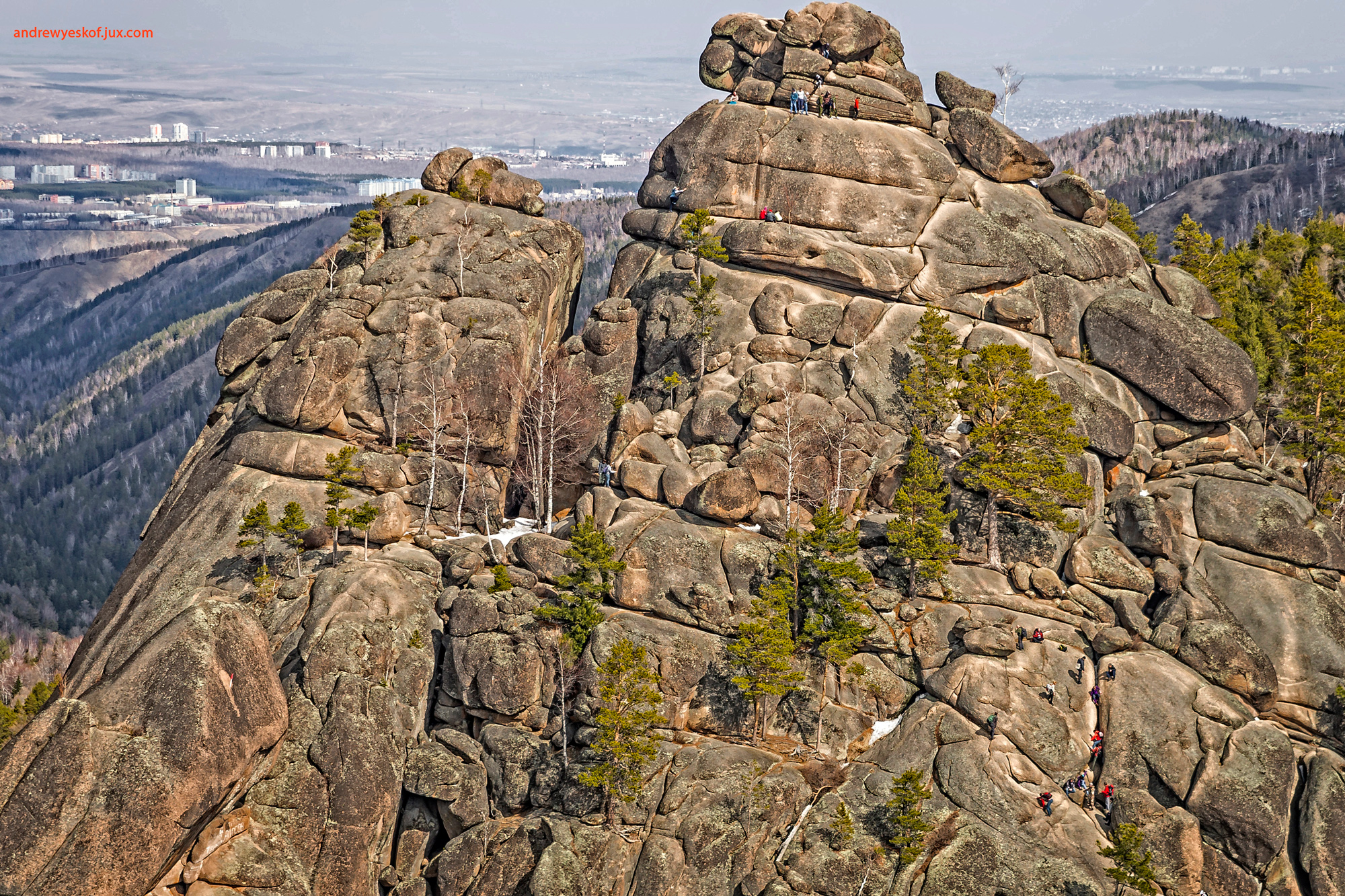
Hikers climbing a rock (known locally as the First Pillar). A suburb of Krasnoyarsk is seen in the background.

Daniel Gottlieb Messerschmidt explored the Stolby between 1720 and 1727. He visited Krasnoyarsk three times during his 7-year exploration of Siberia. Vitus Bering visited it in 1733–1734.

In 1735 the Pillars were seen by the members of the Second Kamchatka Expedition, including naturalists Johann Georg Gmelin and his assistant Stepan Krasheninnikov.

In 1771–1773, Peter Simon Pallas visited the Stolby. He lived about a year in Krasnoyarsk, working on such papers as "Journey in various provinces of the Russian Empire", "Description of plants of the Russian state", and "Russian-Asian zoogeography."

The gold rush started in Siberia in the 1830s. Gold was mined in the Stolby. "Royev Ruchey" (Eng. "Scooped Brook") was so named because of the activities of miners.

In 1833, furs of 67 sables, foxes and 43 to thousands of skins of other animals were obtained in the Stolby region.

In 1870 and 1880s, a Krasnoyarsk teacher named Ivan Savenkov organized school trips to the "Pillars". In 1886, Savenkov published a topographical description of the suburbs of Krasnoyarsk.

From the late 1940s to the beginning of the 21st century, 16 collections of scientific papers about the Pillars were published. The effect of air pollution and recreational using on taiga ecosystems was investigated. Ivan Belyak has authored several books about the area.

== History of protection ==
The core of the area was declared a natural reserve (zapovednik) on June 30, 1925, by the Krasnoyarsk soviet in order to protect the picturesque Syenite Buttes and surrounding rocky landscape. About 3.5% of the territory was open to hikers seeking to visit and climb the rocks.

In 1947 a married couple (Yelena Krutovskaya and James Dulkeyt) set up a farm for wild animals injured by poachers. In 2000, it was expanded into a zoo named Royev Ruchey.

In 2007 Stolby was submitted to the list of UNESCO World Heritage Sites, but the inscription was deferred indefinitely.

On December 4, 2019, the legal status of the Stolby Nature Reserve was changed to that of a national park (IUCN category II).

== See also ==
- Lena Pillars
- List of rock formations
