= Krasnoyarsk-East railway station =

Railway station in Russia

Krasnoyarsk-East Красноярск-Восточный

General information
- Location: Russia, Krasnoyarsk
- Coordinates: 55.997607°N 93.109027°E
- System: Goods station
- Owner: Russian Railways (Krasnoyarsk Railway)
- Line: Achinsk—Yenisey

Other information
- Station code: 890201

Services
| Preceding station | Krasnoyarsk Railway | Following station |
Location

Krasnoyarsk-East (Russian: Красноярск-Восточный) is a goods station on Trans-Siberian Railway in Krasnoyarsk, Russia. It is located 4,123.4 kilometres (2,562.2 mi) from Moscow and 26.3 kilometres (16.3 mi) from Krasnoyarsk Railway station.
