= Andrei Shepelenko =

Russian ice hockey player

- Born: May 12, 1980; Krasnoyarsk
- Position: Forward
- KHL team: Avtomobilist Yekaterinburg
- Playing career: 1996–2017

Andrei Shepelenko is a Russian professional ice hockey forward who currently plays for Avtomobilist Yekaterinburg of the Kontinental Hockey League (KHL).
