= Trams in Krasnoyarsk =

Tram network in Krasnoyarsk, Russia

Krasnoyarsk Tram Network
- Красноярский трамвай
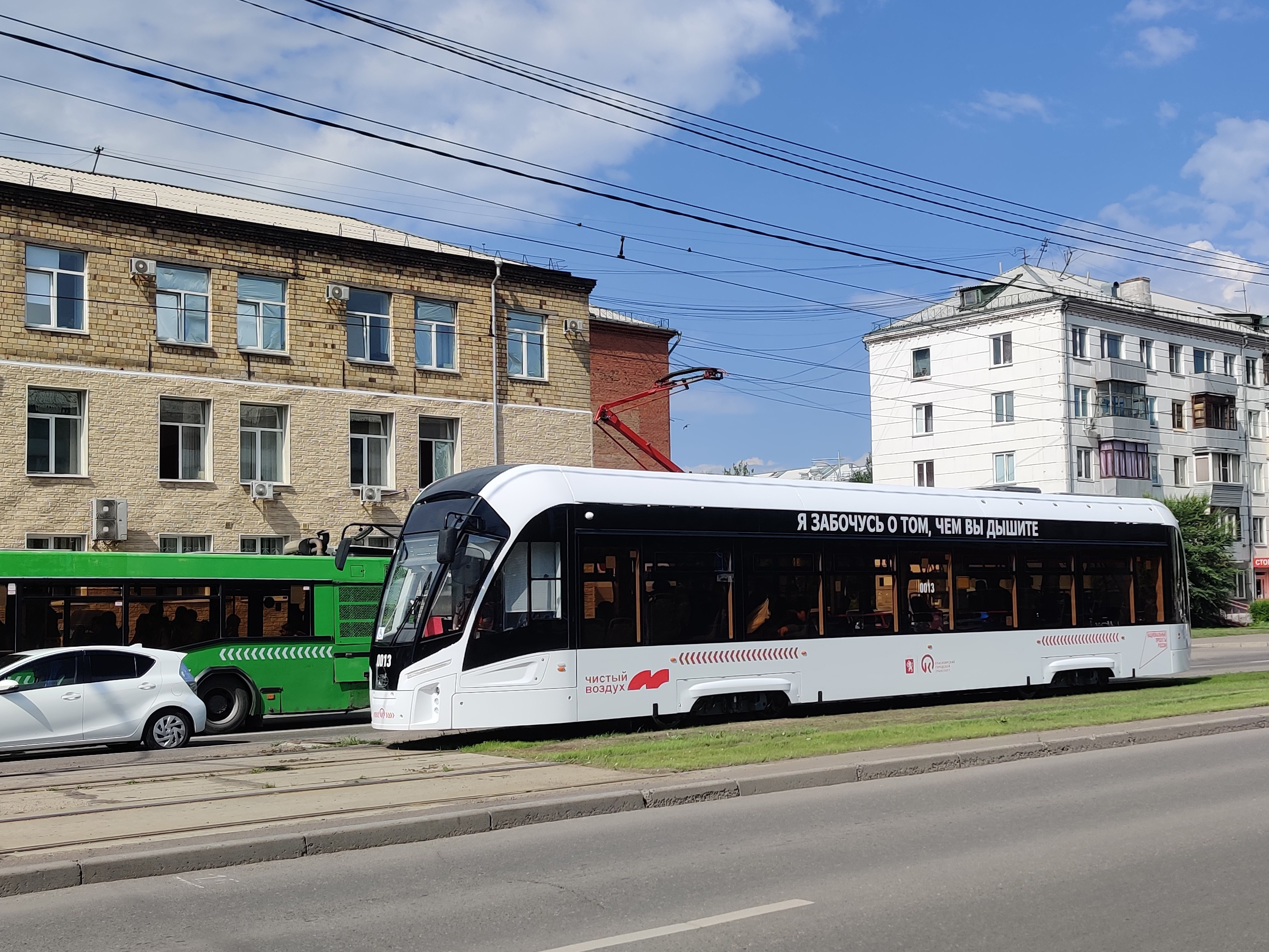

Operation
- Locale: Krasnoyarsk, Russia
- Open: 29 April 1958
- Status: Operational
- Lines: 4

Infrastructure
- Track gauge: 1,524 mm (5 ft)
- Propulsion system: Electricity
- Electrification: Overhead line, 600 V DC
- Depot: 1

The Krasnoyarsk tramway network (Russian: Красноярский трамвай) is a tram system in the city of Krasnoyarsk in the Krasnoyarsk Krai, Russia.

== Background ==
It opened on 29 April 1958. As of August 2024, there are four routes in the city which are serviced by a single depot. The length of the tracks in 2008 was 28.5 km.

In April 2022, regional authorities announced plans to attract 23.1 billion rubles in investment in the city's tram system. It is planned to build a new line along the Oktyabrsky Bridge to the Solnechny residential area on the left bank, 30 km long, reconstruct existing tracks, traction substations and depots, and purchase 32 three-section and 44 single-section trams.
