= Krasnoyarsk Bridge =

Railway bridge in Krasnoyarsk, Russia

Krasnoyarsk Bridge Красноярский железнодорожный мост
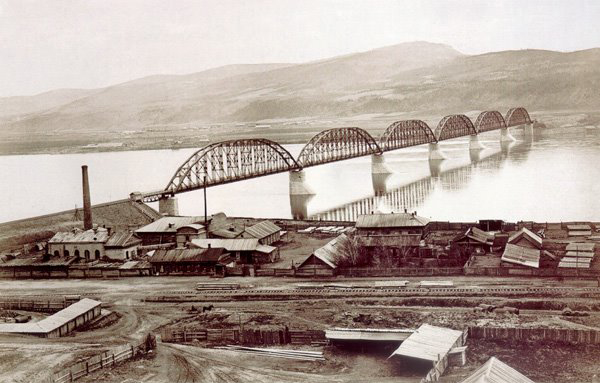
- Coordinates: 55°59′19″N 92°48′44″E
- Locale: Krasnoyarsk, Russia

History
- Opened: March 28, 1899
- Closed: January 30, 1999

Location
- Interactive map of Krasnoyarsk Bridge

Krasnoyarsk Railway Bridge in Krasnoyarsk, Siberia, carries the Krasnoyarsk Railway (part of the Trans-Siberian Railway) across the Yenisei River. It was originally a single-track truss bridge. The total length of the structure was 1 km, span width of 140 meters, the height of metal trusses in the vertex of the parabola was 20 meters.

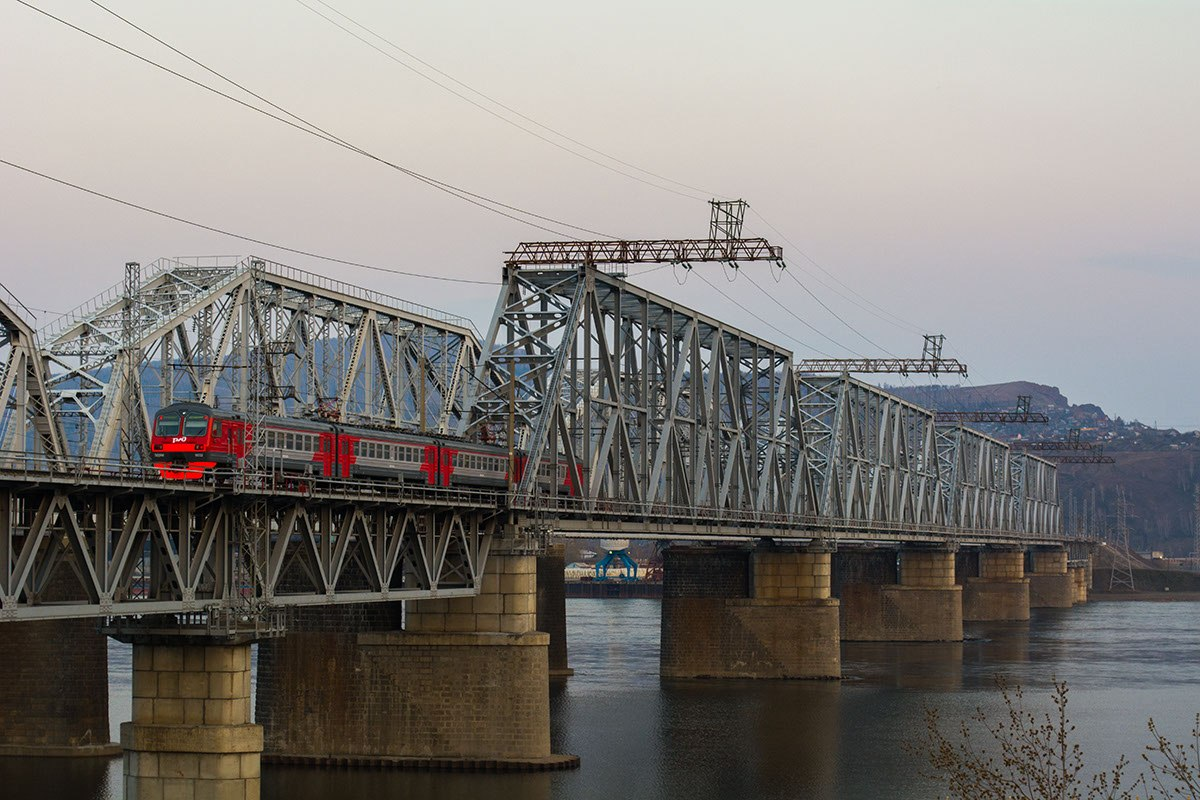

== History ==
The construction of the bridge was undertaken by a team of skilled Russian workers and technicians, who were overseen by the experienced engineer Evgeny Karlovich Knorre. The design for the bridge was conceptualized by Lavr Proskuryakov, a highly esteemed Professor at the Imperial Moscow Technical School.

The ambitious project commenced in 1895, with the momentous occasion of laying the first stone taking place on August 30, 1896. Notable figures present at this historic event included the esteemed Yenisei governor, P.M. Preynne, the dedicated engineer E.K. Knorre, as well as various railway authorities and curious onlookers from the nearby urban areas.

The ceremony, presided over by Akaki, the bishop of Yenisei and Krasnoyarsk, was a solemn prayer service that held great significance. It involved the placement of a remarkable stone, adorned with a beautifully crafted cross, into the foundation of an abutment pier. Within this stone, a precious manuscript was carefully inserted, containing invaluable details about the esteemed builders and distinguished guests who were present during this momentous occasion. As the prayer service unfolded, a symbolic act of generosity and prosperity took place, as gold and silver coins were ceremoniously poured onto the stone, symbolizing blessings and abundance for the project. To ensure the stone's security and stability, it was then covered by yet another stone, encased with a protective layer of cement slurry, sealing its place in history and marking the beginning of a grand endeavor.

Yenisei Bridge was an extraordinary construction with several remarkable features. It stretched a total length of 907 meters, making it one of the longest bridges in Russia at the time. What set it apart from other bridges of its time were its exceptionally long trusses, measuring 144.5 meters. These trusses were a true marvel of engineering and showcased the advanced techniques employed in its construction. Another notable aspect of the Yenisei bridge was the use of wood for the construction of caissons. This decision showcased the engineers' ingenuity and resourcefulness in utilizing available materials to achieve their goal. Additionally, the working chamber of the bridge incorporated a compressed air bed, which added to the complexity and sophistication of the project. In addition to its impressive trusses, the Yenisei bridge featured a lightweight truss design, which further enhanced its structural integrity. The engineers also employed a unique freezing method to stabilize the soils during the construction process. This innovative technique ensured the bridge's longevity and durability.

The construction of this magnificent structure required a whopping 3 million rubles, making it the most expensive project of its kind at that time. This substantial investment demonstrates the significance and importance placed on the bridge by the authorities and the immense value it brought to the region.

On March 28, 1899, the construction of the bridge was successfully finished. The bridge underwent rigorous load tests on the previous day, March 27. During these tests, a total of two trains, each comprising four powerful engines and six carriages loaded with heavy rails, were carefully driven across the newly constructed bridge. Following these initial load tests, two additional engines accompanied by carriages carrying rails were sent across the bridge at a remarkable speed of 70 kilometers per hour. The structure was awarded the prestigious Gold Medal at the Exposition Universelle (1900), thanks to the dedicated efforts of a special committee headed by the renowned Gustave Eiffel.

=== Renovation ===
During the 1930s, in an effort to enhance the capacity of the Trans-Siberian Railway, an additional track was constructed on the bridge. Moreover, in close proximity to this bridge, another structurally comparable bridge was erected. During the 1990s, a decision was made to create support structures on the foundations of the former cutwaters of the old bridge. This involved constructing new spans on top and simultaneously demolishing the old pre-revolutionary trusses. The new bridge was finally opened to traffic on December 25, 1998, while the old bridge was closed to traffic in January 1999. The process of dismantling the old trusses took place between 2002 and 2007. It is worth noting that the demolition of the old bridge took significantly longer than the initial construction.

In 2003, representatives of Russian Railways wanted to exclude the bridge from the list of cultural heritage sites by contacting the Legislative Assembly of Krasnoyarsk Krai. In 2007, the remaining parts of the bridge were scrapped.
