= Akademgorodok (Krasnoyarsk) =

Coordinates: 55°59′25″N 92°45′40″E

Akademgorodok (Krasnoyarsk) is a major scientific center of Siberia; located in the west of the city Krasnoyarsk (Russia). Built during the Soviet times, it was conceived as a healthier, privileged enclave for academics to live in, among trees and vegetation and outside of the dirtier industrial areas.

== History ==
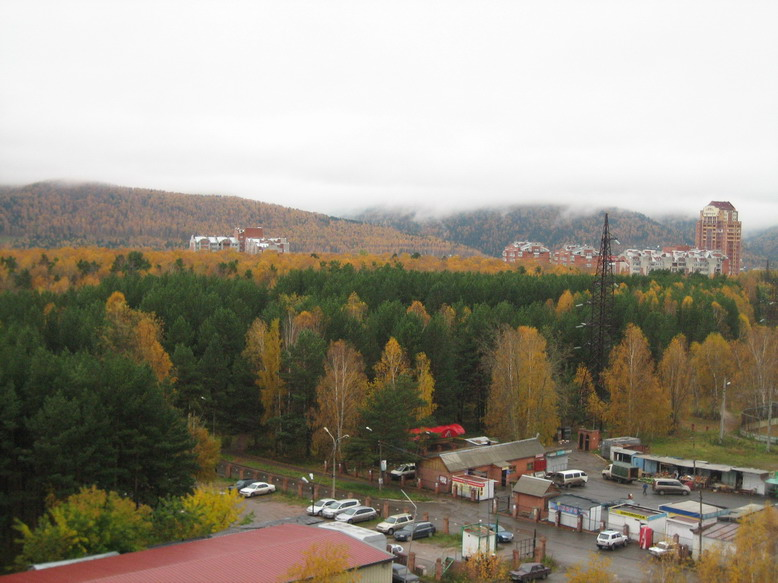
Autumn gold in the Upper Akademgorodok

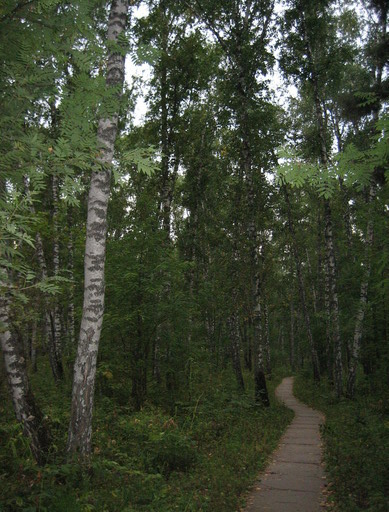
Akademgorodok. The Birch Wood.

The oldest institute, Forest Institute was established in 1944. The Institute of Physics was established in 1956 by academician L. V. Kirensky. The Institute of Computational Modeling SB RAS was established in 1975. The Institute of Biophysics was established in 1981.

== Main science centers of Academgorodok ==
Krasnoyarsk Akademgorodok is home to more than 20 research institutions and organizations. The most prominent are:

- Institute of Forest of SB RAS
- Institute of Physics of SB RAS
- Institute of Computational Modeling of SB RAS
- Institute of Biophysics of SB RAS
- Institute of Chemistry of SB RAS

Also:

- Central science library – contains more than 500 000 books
- House of Scientists

== See also ==
- Krasnoyarsk
