= Minin =

Minin may refer to:

- Minin (surname)
- Minin and Pozharsky (disambiguation)
- Russian cruiser Minin, in operation 1878–1915
- MV Kuzma Minin, a Russian bulk carrier, completed in 1980 and scrapped in 2020
- 8134 Minin, an asteroid discovered in 1978
