= Minin (surname) =

Minin (Russian: Минин) is a Russian masculine surname, its feminine counterpart is Minina. It may refer to

- Fyodor Minin, Russian Arctic explorer
- Kuzma Minin, 17th-century Russian military commander
- Leonid Minin (born 1947), arms trafficker
- Mikhail Minin (1922–2008)), World War II Soviet soldier
- Nikita Minin, birth name of Russian Orthodox Patriarch Nikon
- Oleg V. Minin (born 1960), Russian physicist
- Vladilen F. Minin (born 1932), Soviet physicist
