= Atmospheric and Oceanic Optics =

Peer-reviewed scientific journal

- Discipline: Atmospheric optics, ocean optics
- Language: English
- Edited by: Igor V. Ptashnik

Publication details
- Former name: Atmospheric Optics (1988—1992)
- History: 1988—present
- Publisher: Springer, Pleiades Publishing
- Frequency: Bimonthly
- Impact factor: 0.9 (2024)

Standard abbreviations
- ISO 4: Atmos. Ocean. Opt.

Indexing
- CODEN: AOCOEK
- ISSN: 1024-8560 (print); 2070-0393 (web)

Links
- Journal homepage; Online access; Online archive

Atmospheric and Oceanic Optics is a peer-reviewed scientific journal co-published bimonthly by Springer Science+Business Media and Pleiades Publishing. It covers developments in atmospheric and ocean optics, including scattering of optical waves, turbulent and nonlinear optical phenomena, adaptive optics and remote sensing. The journal was established under the name Atmospheric Optics in 1988 and featured English translations of the articles from the journal Optika Atmosfery. It received its current name in 1992. Its current editor-in-chief is Igor V. Ptashnik (V.E. Zuev Institute of Atmospheric Optics).

== Abstracting and indexing ==
The journal is abstracted and indexed in:

- Emerging Sources Citation Index
- ProQuest databases
- Scopus

According to the Journal Citation Reports, the journal has a 2024 impact factor of 0.9.
