= Oleg Minin =

Russian physicist

Oleg V. Minin
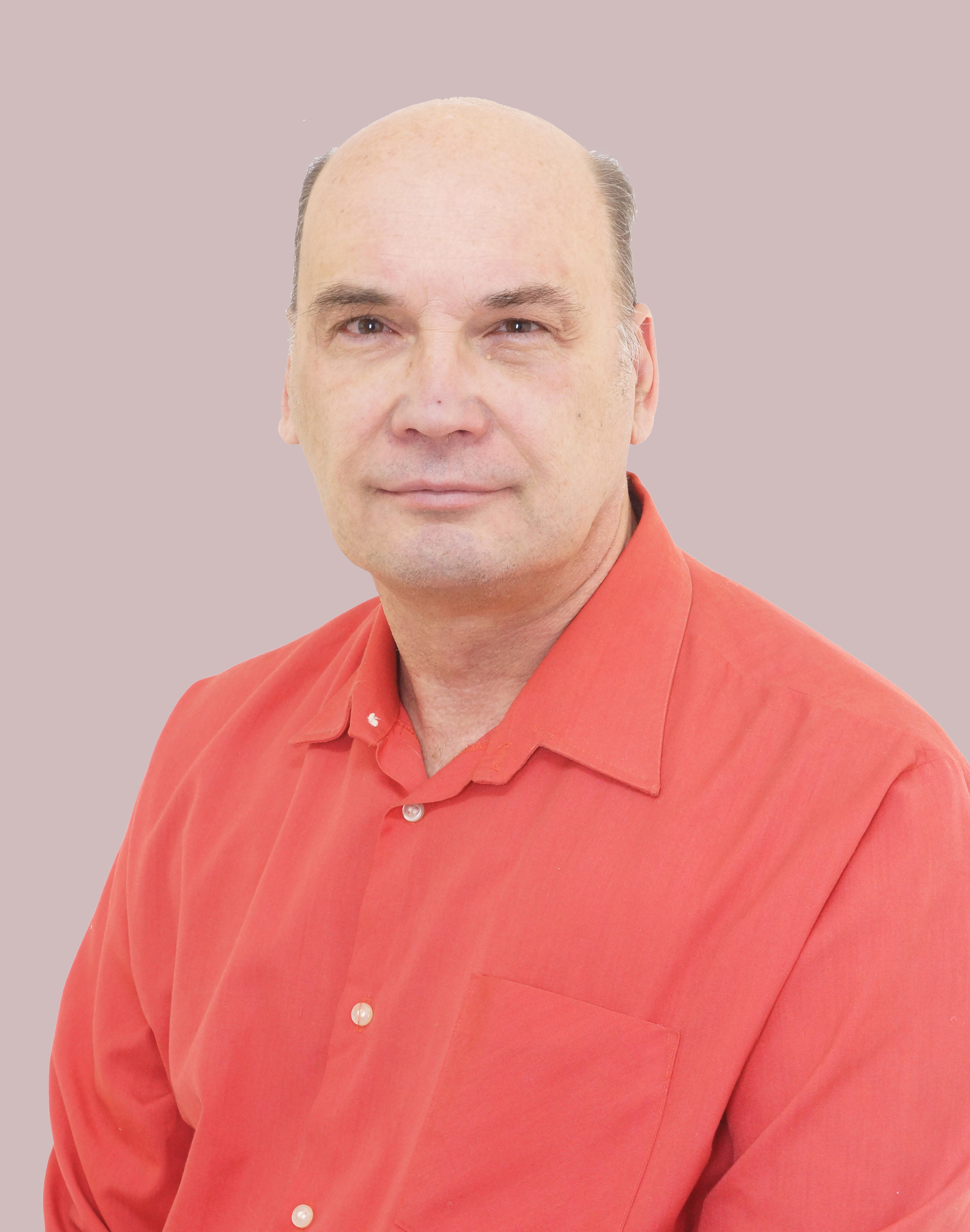
- Oleg V. Minin
- Born: 22 March 1960 (age 66); Novosibirsk, Academytown
- Education: Novosibirsk State University
- Scientific career
- Fields: Physicist, Radiophysics, Photonics, Terahertz technology
- Workplaces: Tomsk Polytechnic University

Oleg V. Minin (Russian: Олег Владиленович Минин) was born on 22 March 1960 in Novosibirsk, Academytown, Russia. He is a Russian physicist, a corresponding member of the Russian Academy of Metrology, and a full professor of Physics at the Tomsk Polytechnic University. He is renowned for his contributions to creating new scientific directions, including THz 3D Zone plate, Mesatronics (mesoscale photonics), hyper cumulative shaped charge, subwavelength structured light, encompassing acoustics and surface plasmon.

== Biography ==
Oleg V. Minin obtained his M.S. from Novosibirsk State University in 1982. He earned his PhD in physics and mathematics from the Tomsk Institute of Atmospheric Optics in 1987, specialising in radiophysics and quantum physics. During this period, he also worked part-time as a laboratory assistant at the Institute of Applied Physics (Novosibirsk, Academytown), founded by his father, scientist Vladilen F. Minin, in 1966.

In March 2004, Oleg defended his doctoral thesis at the Novosibirsk State Technical University and was awarded the degree of Doctor of Technical Sciences, equivalent to a Habilitation degree.

His dissertation, which received recognition from the Ministry of Defence (Russia) for the best scientific work during 1997-2000, served as the foundation for several monographs, including "Diffraction Optics of Millimetre Waves," "Basic Principles of Fresnel Antenna Arrays," and later, "Diffractive Optics and Nanophotonics: Resolution Below the Diffraction Limit," and "The Photonic Hook: From Optics to Acoustics and Plasmonics." In 2007, his biographical data was included in Marquis Who's Who in the World. Almost all of Oleg's scientific work was conducted with his twin brother, Igor V. Minin.

In April 2007, a book dedicated to the 40th anniversary of the Novosibirsk Institute of Applied Physics led to accusations by the FSB of Russia that Oleg and his brother Igor had revealed sensitive information about projects conducted at an institute that conducts research for the Ministry of Defence (Russia). This case gained significant public attention, and well-known scientists and human rights activists came forward to defend the physics brothers. However, in July of the same year, the FSB investigators dropped the charges against Oleg and Igor, and prosecutors in Novosibirsk issued a rare apology to the scientists.

== Research ==
O.V. Minin has established strong research foundations in various fields of physics, holding global priority in areas such as shock wave focusing using diffractive optics, explosive plasma antennas, near-field subwavelength structured light, mesoscale acoustic lenses, and hyper cumulative shaped charge.

In collaboration with his twin brother, Igor V. Minin, in 2015, he discovered the so-called photonic hook effect in optics, plasmonics, and acoustics. This effect involves artificially curving a light beam with subwavelength curvature and beam waist. Additionally, they experimentally verified the existence of surface plasmon photonic jet and photonic hook phenomena.

In dielectric structures with Mie size parameter on the order of ten, which lie between wave and geometrical optics, O.V. Minin and his colleagues discovered new and unusual effects, including high-order Fano resonance in dielectric mesoscale particles, also known as the super-resonance effect. This effect allows for the generation of giant magnetic and electric fields particles compared with the magnetic field in Neutron star.

With his colleagues also pioneered the study of the unusual optical properties of superresonance and photonic hooks in and near a rotating dielectric sphere, based on the analogue of optical Magnus effect. With his brother, he also founded the new field of "freezing droplet optics" with the discovery of unusual time domain effects of Fano resonancesand photonic hook.

The presence of these unusual properties and applications indicates the formation of a promising new direction in optics called "Mesotronics".

O.V. Minin conducted pioneering investigations of plasma jets produced by intense laser-matter interactions based on hyperaccumulation principles. This research aims to understand better astrophysical jets, as cumulative jets are observed to originate from young stellar objects and active galactic nuclei. The findings also provide insight into shock waves.

O.V. Minin is the author or co-author of over 150 patents in the USSR/Russia and has contributed to about 450 research publications, including 22 monographs (12 in Russian, 9 in English, and 1 in Chinese).

== Awards ==
- O.V. Minin received the medal of the Russian National Committee on Theoretical and Applied Mechanics of the Russian Academy of Sciences, named after Kh.A. Rakhmatulin, in 2013 for his contribution to the theory of hyperaccumulation.
- Additionally, he has been awarded Russian medals named after V.I. Vernadsky and A. Nobel.

== Selected papers ==
- Minin O.V. and Minin I.V. Diffractional Optics of Millimetre Waves, lOP Publisher, 2004. 396 p. ISBN 9780367454326
- Minin I.V. and Minin O.V. Basic Principles of Fresnel Antenna Arrays, Springer, 2008. ISBN 978-3-540-79559-9
- Minin I.V. and Minin O.V. Diffractive Optics and Nanophotonics: Resolution Below the Diffraction Limit, Springer, 2016. ISBN 978-3-319-24251-4
- Minin I.V. and Minin O.V. Control of focusing properties of diffraction elements, Sov. J. Quantum Electron, 20, 198 (1990).
- Minin I.V. and Minin O.V. 3D diffractive lenses to overcome the 3D Abbe subwavelength diffraction, Chinese Optics Letters, 12(6), 060014 (2014).
- Pacheco-Peña V., Beruete M., Minin I.V. and Minin O.V. Terajets produced by dielectric cuboids, Appl. Phys. Let., 105, 084102 (2014).
- Luk'yanchuk B.S., Paniagua-Domínguez R., Minin I.V., Minin O.V. and Wang Z. Refractive index less than two: photonic nanojets yesterday, today and tomorrow (Invited). Optical Materials Express 7(6), 1820 (2017).
- Pham H.-H. N., Hisatake S., Minin O.V., Nagatsuma T. and Minin I.V. Enhancement of Spatial Resolution of Terahertz Imaging Systems Based on Terajet Generation by Dielectric Cube, APL Photonics 2, 056106 (2017).
- Minin I.V., Minin O.V., Katyba G.M., Chernomyrdin N.V., Kurlov V.N., Zaytsev K.I., Yue L., Wang Z. and Christodoulides D.N. Experimental observation of a photonic hook, Appl. Phys. Lett., 114, 031105 (2019).
- Rubio C., Tarrazó-Serrano D., Minin O.V., Uris A. and Minin I.V. Acoustical hooks: A new subwavelength self-bending beam, Results in Physics, 16, 102921 (2020).
