= Tomsk Polytechnic University =

Technical university in Tomsk, Russia

National Research Tomsk Polytechnic University
- Национальный исследовательский Томский политехнический университет
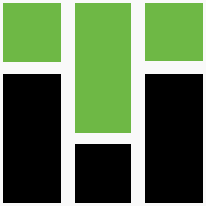
- Former names: Tomsk Technological Institute (1896-1925); Siberian Technological Institute (1925-1930); Siberian Institute of Mechanical Engineering (1930-1934); Tomsk Industrial Institute (1934-1944); Tomsk Polytechnic Institute (1944-1991); Tomsk Polytechnic University (1991-2009)
- Motto: Scientia, Libertas, Prosperitas
- Motto in English: Knowledge, Freedom and Prosperity
- Type: Public
- Established: 1896
- Rector: Leonid Sukhikh (acting)
- Students: 11,500
- Location: Tomsk, Russia; 56°27′55″N 84°57′01″E
- Colours: Pale Green and Black
- Website: www.tpu.ru/en
- Building details

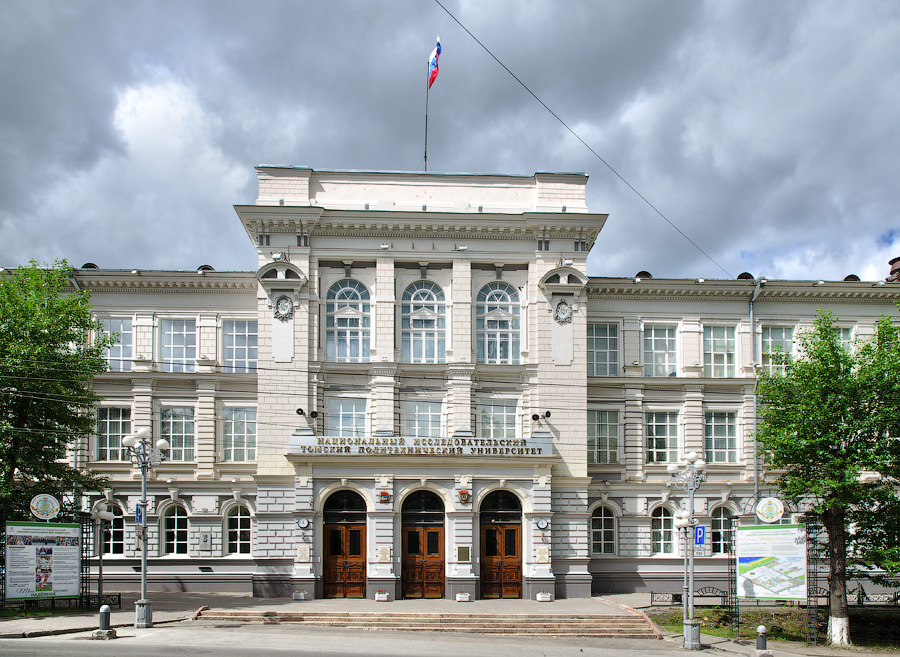
- TPU main building

University rankings

Global – Overall
- QS World: =688 (2026)
- USNWR Global: 879 (2023)

Regional – Overall
- QS Emerging Europe and Central Asia: 37 (2022)

National Research Tomsk Polytechnic University (TPU) is a technical university in Russia. TPU was a member of 12 international associations, including the Conference of European Schools for Advanced Engineering Education and Research (CESAER) until it was suspended in March 2022, and the European University Association (EUA) until it was suspended in March 2022. TPU was included in Project 5-100, a 2013 state program aimed at bringing at least five Russian universities from among the project participants into the 100 best universities in the world.

In 2022, the university was ranked #801 in the world by World University Rankings by Times Higher Education, and #879 in the world by U.S. News & World Report in 2023, and in 2020 it was ranked #862 in the world by University Ranking by Academic Performance (URAP)

== History ==
=== Tomsk Technological Institute of Emperor Nicholas II ===
TPU was founded by the Ministry of National Education of the Russian Empire in 1896 as Tomsk Technological Institute of Emperor Nicholas II with the two departments: Mechanical and Chemical Engineering. The State Council of Russia made a decision on the establishment of an institute as a polytechnic academic institution consisting of the four departments: Mechanical, Chemical Engineering, Mining and Construction Engineering. The university's main building was constructed in 1897–1907 based on a project by Robert Marfeld, an academician of architecture.

The position of the first rector was offered to Dmitri Mendeleev. However, he had to refuse the job offer due to his health. Despite his refusal of the job offer, he took active participation in Institute development. In January 1899, in accordance with the Supreme Decree of the Department of Civil and Ecclesiastical Administration, a student of Mendeleev, Professor Efim Zubashev was appointed the first rector and chairman of the construction committee to erect premises of Tomsk Technological Institute.

the Sibirskaya Zhizn newspaper about opening of Tomsk Technological Institute of Emperor Nicholas II, 1900

The first classes started on October 9, 1900. Professor Vladimir Nekrasov gave the first lecture on analytic geometry. Among the first professors of the institute, there were notable scientists: Professor Nikolai Kischner, who discovered the Wolff–Kishner reduction; Professor Theodor Molien, who gave a foundation to higher mathematical education and mathematical research in Siberia; Evgeny Biron, who discovered the phenomena of secondary periodicity; Professor Boris Weinberg, who was an outstanding scientist in physics and glaciologist; Professor Vladimir Obruchev, who was an organizer of the Mining Department and a founder of mining and geological school in Siberia. In the autumn term of 1904/05, Adam Yensh, an outstanding Russian urban planner and a sanitary engineer, gave lectures on construction works and architecture to students of the Construction Engineering Department and on introduction to architecture to students of the Mechanical, Mining and Chemical Engineering Departments. In 1917, Tomsk Technological Institute of Emperor Nicholas II was renamed into Tomsk Technological Institute.

=== Institute after the Russian Revolution of 1917 ===
==== 1917–40 ====
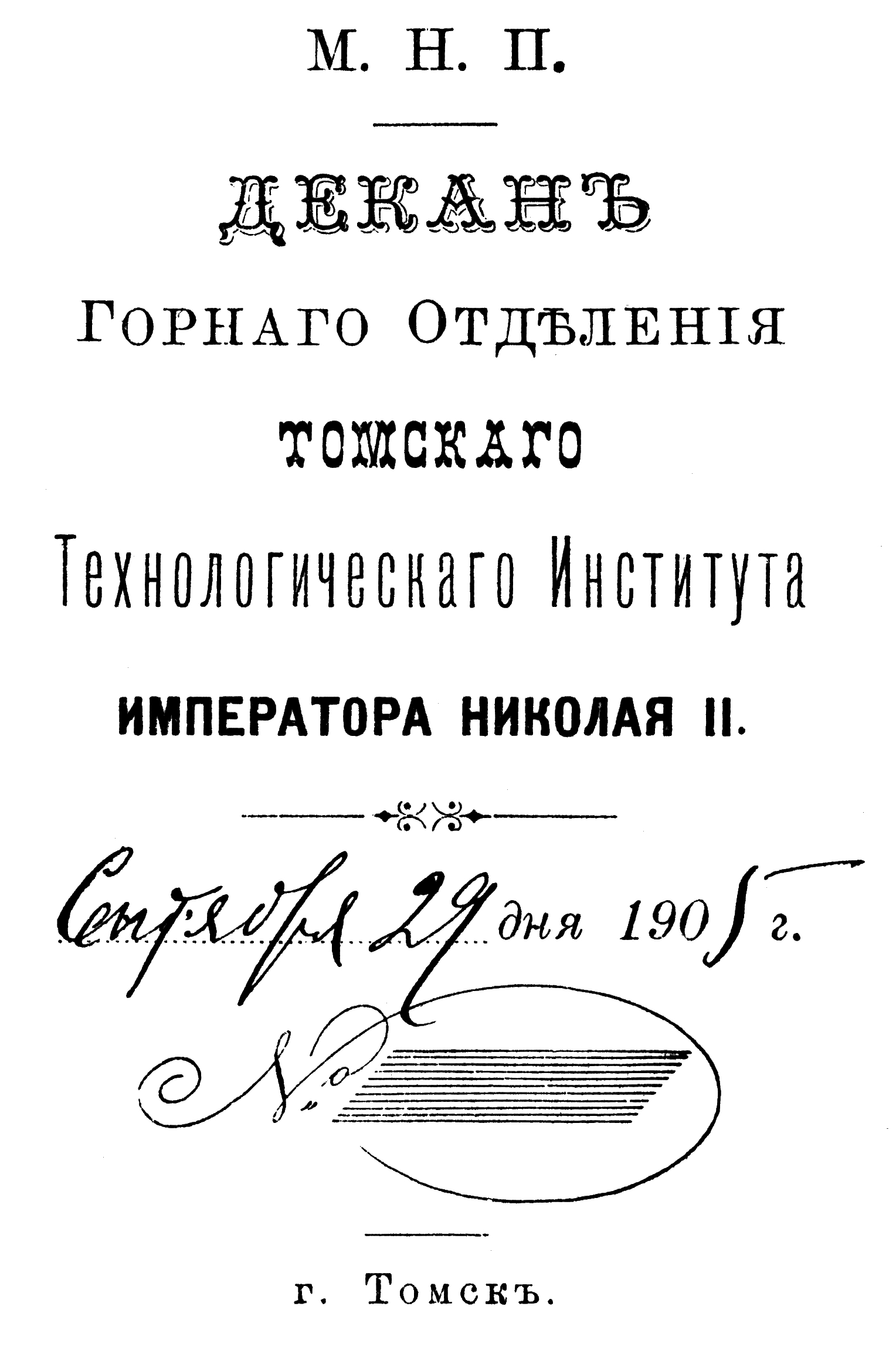

In 1925, the institute was renamed into Dzerzhinsky Siberian Technological Institute. In 1930, Dzerzhinsky Siberian Technological Institute was divided into the following institutes:

- Siberian Geological Prospecting Institute (Tomsk);
- West Siberian Mechanical Engineering Institute (Tomsk);
- Siberian Chemical Engineering Institute (Tomsk);
- West Siberian Mining Institute (Tomsk);
- West Siberian Institute of Agricultural Engineering (Novosibirsk);
- Siberian Institute of Rail Transport Engineers (later Tomsk Electromechanical Institute of Transport Engineers), which was moved to Omsk in 1962 and currently is Omsk State Transport University;
- Siberian Construction Institute (moved to Novosibirsk);
- Siberian State Institute of Ferrous Metals (moved to Novokuznetsk);
- Flour Milling and Elevating Institute (Tomsk);
- Institute of Non-Ferrous Metals (Irkutsk).

In 1934, Siberian Geological Prospecting Institute (Tomsk), West Siberian Mechanical Engineering Institute (Tomsk) and Siberian Chemical Engineering Institute (Tomsk) were united into Tomsk Industrial Institute. On March 5, 1935, in accordance with the All-Union Central Executive Committee of the USSR, the institute was named after Sergey Kirov. In 1940, the institute was conferred the Order of the Red Banner of Labour.

==== 1941–59 ====
In 1941-45 during the battles at the Eastern Front of World War II, all research work of the institute was focused on the development of the arms industry, the assistance to arms production, including to evacuated industrial enterprises in Tomsk. All research work of universities was coordinated by the Scientists’ Committee formed in June 1941, due to the initiative of a number of professors of Tomsk universities. The Committee contained Tomsk scientists, including professors of Kirov Tomsk Industrial Institute (Innokenty Butakov, Innokenty Gebler, Mikhail Korovin). One of the vice-chairmen of the committee was Konstantin Shmargunov, the rector of the institute. TPU alumni headed a lot of USSR plants producing tanks and weapons. Timofey Gorbachev, a 1928 alumnus of Dzerzhinsky Siberian Technological Institute, headed the department of the Kuzbassugol Building Complex. Nikolay Kamov, a 1923 alumnus of the Mechanical Faculty of Tomsk Technological Institute, became chief engineer at the Design Bureau producing helicopters. Vladimir Kozhevin, a 1934 alumnus of the Mining Department of Siberian Institute of Mechanical Engineering, from 1941 held a position of a head of the Engineering Office and a deputy chief engineer at the OsinnikiUgol Trust of the Kuzbassugol Building Complex, where coal of the most valuable types required for the metallurgical and defense industries of Russia was produced. In 1942, he was appointed chief engineer and head of mine No. 10 of the OsinnikiUgol Trust. From 1943 till the end of the battles at the Eastern Front, the mine maintained the ideals of the USSR State Defense Committee. Valery Kuznetsov, a 1932 alumnus of the Geological Prospecting Faculty of Siberian Institute of Mechanical Engineering, during the years of battles at the Eastern Front was in charge of drawing geologic maps at the West-Siberian Geology Administration. These maps were required for the exploration of minerals, a necessity in which sharply rose during that period. Over 700 people, including students, academic staff, employees and volunteers went to war. They took part in many battles and only few of them were able to reach Berlin leaving their signatures on the walls of the Reichstag building.

In 1944, the institute was renamed into Kirov Tomsk Polytechnic Institute. In 1952, the institute broadcast the first TV program, which was a movie magazine accompanied by sound.

In 1957, the Scientific Research Institute of Applied Physics was set up at Kirov Tomsk Polytechnic Institute. In 1959, the Department of Evening Studies (current Seversk State Technological Academy of National Research Nuclear University MEPhI (Moscow Engineering Physics Institute)) of the TPU Faculty of Physics and Engineering was opened.

==== 1960–2019 ====
In 1962, Tomsk Institute of Radioelectronics and Electronic Technology was set up based on the TPU Radio Engineering Faculty. In 1967, the ITR-1000 Nuclear Research Reactor of the institute was launched. In 1971, Tomsk Polytechnic Institute was conferred the Order of the October Revolution.

In 1981, the Cybernetics Scientific Training Center was formed at TPU. On October 18, 1991, the Council of Ministers of the Russian Soviet Federative Socialist Republic adopted resolution No. 552 “On Reorganization of Tomsk Polytechnic Institute into Tomsk Polytechnic University”.

In July 2013, the university became one of the contest winners to be awarded the status of Leading Universities of Russia. On the basis of various TPU faculties, departments and majors, over 20 free-standing universities in Moscow, Novosibirsk, Omsk, Tomsk, Seversk, Krasnoyarsk, Kemerovo, Barnaul, Chita, Khabarovsk and other Russian cities were opened at different time.

==== 2020–present ====
Dmitry Andreevich Sednev, Rector of the university, was suspended by the European University Association (EUA) following support for the 2022 Russian invasion of Ukraine by the Russian Union of Rectors (RUR) in March 2022, for being "diametrically opposed to the European values that they committed to when joining EUA”. TPU was suspended in March 2022 by the Conference of European Schools for Advanced Engineering Education and Research (CESAER), and the European University Association (EUA).

== Rankings ==
Rankings	In Russia	In Europe	In the world	Year
World University Rankings by Times Higher Education			801	2022
U.S. News & World Report			879	2023
University Ranking by Academic Performance (URAP)			862	2020
2020 Forbes 100 Best Russian Universities	7			2020
QS World University Rankings			501-550	2014
Russian university ranking (Expert RA)	7			2013
Classbase	16	510	1,379	2013
Web of World Universities	12			2013
SCImago	19	142	2,421	2012

== Academics ==
Former names:
- 1896 Tomsk Technological Institute of Emperor Nicholas II (TTI)
- 1917 Tomsk Technological Institute (TTI)
- 1925 Dzerzhinsky Siberian Technological Institute (STI)
- 1930 Siberian Institute of Mechanical Engineering (SIME)
- 1934 Kirov Tomsk Industrial Institute (TII)
- 1944 Kirov Tomsk Polytechnic Institute (TPI)
- 1991 Tomsk Polytechnic University (TPU)
- 2009 National Research Polytechnic University (TPU)

TPU offers

- 29 bachelor’s degree programs;
- 32 master’s degree programs;
- 9 specialist degree programs;
- 19 postgraduate programs;
- 31 research degrees.

In 2017, TPU institutes were transformed into engineering and research schools:

- School of Computer Science and Robotics;
- School of Non-Destructive Testing;
- School of Advanced Manufacturing Technologies;
- School of Earth Sciences and Engineering;
- School of Energy and Power Engineering;
- School of Nuclear Science and Engineering;
- Research School of High-Energy Physics;
- Research School of Chemistry and Applied Biomedical Sciences;
- School of Core Engineering Education;
- School of Engineering Entrepreneurship.

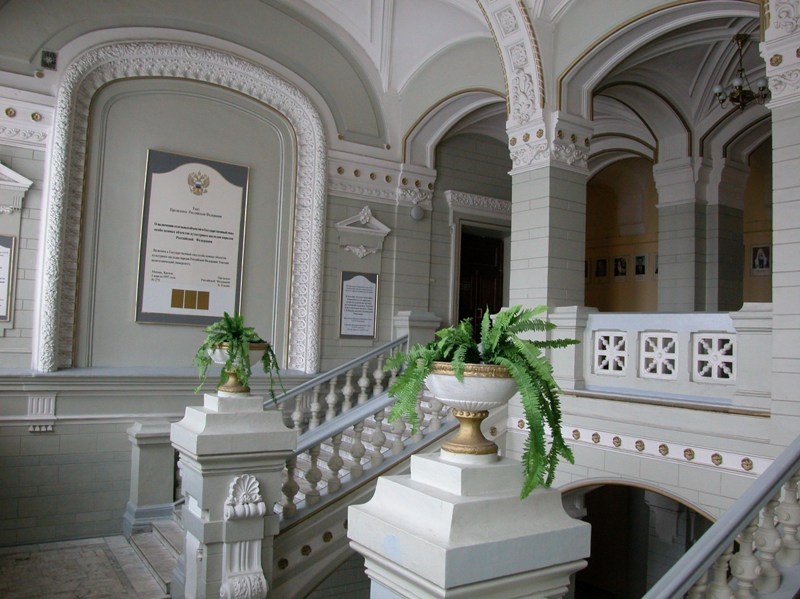
Entry hall of the TPU main building

Yurga Institute of Technology (Yurga campus)

Yurga Institute of Technology (Yurga campus) of TPU was set up as a result of a number of transformations: the Study Support Center (1957), the Mechanical Engineering Faculty (1987), a TPU affiliate in Yurga (1993) and Yurga Institute of Technology (1993). The institute trains engineers for Kemerovo Oblast. The problem of training engineers was always solved in cooperation with Yurga Machine-Building Plant.

Students are trained at 10 departments of the institute where eight out of them are graduate departments. The institute contains over 1,500 students studying full-time, part-time or remotely. The institute includes eight academic and laboratory buildings with over 70 laboratories.

Center of Academic Geology Internships

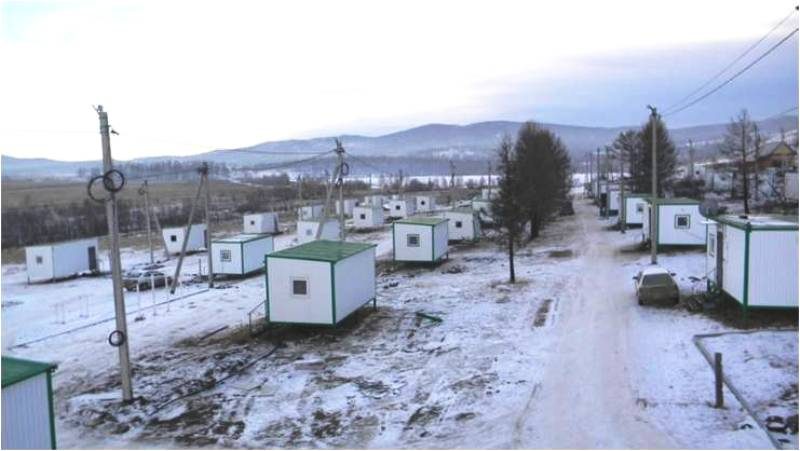
Center of Academic Geology Internships

The Center of Academic Geology Internships is located on the shore of Lake Sobachie in Khakassia. The Center was set up in 1959. It is used for completing geology internships at universities of Western Siberia.

ITR-1000 Nuclear Research Reactor

The IRT-1000 Nuclear Research Reactor was constructed in 1959-67. Annually, over 430 students complete training at the Reactor. They obtain practical expertise on control of a nuclear installation, the physical protection of nuclear facilities, nuclear safety and security, as well as radiation safety. Among all Russian operating reactors, only in Tomsk, at the TPU Reactor, international students are able to complete training. They are trained to work at nuclear facilities in their home countries.

== Research ==
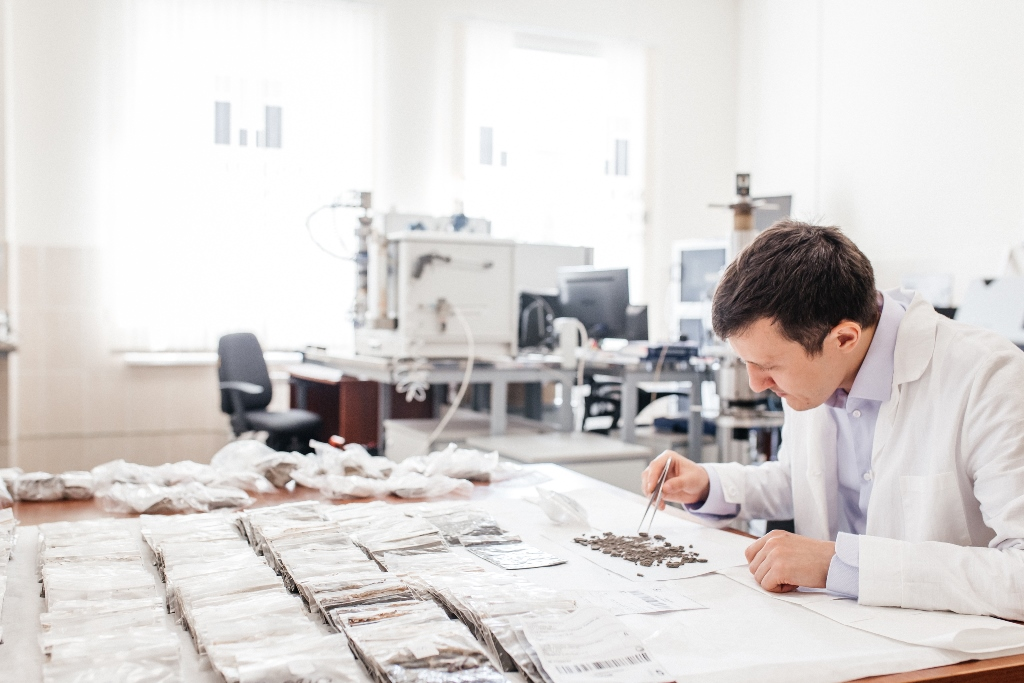
TPU scientists search for a new technology for the production of unconventional Paleozoic oil

Research at TPU is developed in various areas:

- High-energy physics;
- Chemistry and applied biomedical sciences;
- Non-destructive testing;
- Earth sciences and engineering;
- Advanced manufacturing technologies;
- Intelligent energy;
- Nuclear science and engineering.

In October 2012, TPU launched a development program for Resource Efficient Technologies for the period 2013–2018. That program was presented by TPU in 2009 at the Russian federal competition "National Research University". A key point of the program of TPU was announced the formation of high school as a world-class university-based staffing and development of technologies for resource-efficient economy.

TPU developed educational module "Resource Efficiency", prepared and published a textbook "Principals of resource efficiency", optional subject matter of the same name introduced in the curriculum (for all disciplines and areas of undergraduate).

TPU envisages university development in the field of resource-efficient technologies that unites six research and educational clusters:

1. Safe Environment
  1. Non-destructive testing and diagnostics
  2. Materials for extreme conditions
  3. Domestic and industrial waste recycling
2. Sustainable Energy
  1. High-temperature superconductivity technologies for energy production
  2. Nuclear and hydrogen fuel of the new generation
  3. Hybrid simulation in energy production
  4. Resource-efficient generation
3. Medical Engineering
  1. Bioengineering materials and technologies
  2. Radiation technologies in bioengineering
  3. Electrophysical biomedical complexes
4. Planet Resources
  1. Resource-efficient use of mineral resources
  2. Clear water
  3. Green chemistry
5. Cognitive Systems and Telecommunications
  1. Cognitive software and hardware systems
  2. Wireless telecommunication systems and technologies
6. Social Science and Humanities in Engineering
  1. Social science and humanities component of engineering
  2. Mechanisms of technical innovations initiation and engineering forethought.

== International cooperation ==
TPU was a member of 12 international associations, including the Conference of European Schools for Advanced Engineering Education and Research (CESAER) until it was suspended in March 2022, and the European University Association (EUA) until it was suspended in March 2022. Among the business partners of the university is Schlumberger Limited (France). TPU researchers conduct research projects within the grant programs of the European Commission Seventh Framework Programme (FP7), Horizon 2020, Erasmus Programme and others.

== Notable alumni and faculty ==
- David A. Frank-Kamenetskii, theoretical physicist and chemist, professor and doctor of physical, chemical, and mathematical sciences. Developed the thermal explosion theory, worked on plasma physics problems and in astrophysics.
- Nikolay Kamov, helicopter designer
- Alexander Kazantsev, science fiction writer
- Mikhail Mil (did not graduate), helicopter designer, founder of the Mil Moscow Helicopter Plant
- Fritz Noether, German-born mathematician, faculty; executed by the Stalinist NKVD
- Antonina Pirozhkova, civil engineer and writer
- Vladimir Rott, Russian-Canadian electrical engineer turned author
- Kanysh Satpayev, one of the founders of Soviet metallogeny
- Nikolay Semyonov, physicist and chemist.1956 Nobel Prize Winner in Chemistry
- Dan Shechtman, Israeli professor, awarded the 2011 Nobel Prize in Chemistry for the discovery of quasicrystals
- Nikolay Urvantsev, geologist and Arctic explorer
- Mikhail Usov, geologist
- Gennady Mesyats, physicist, founder of scientific schools
- Nikolay Nikitin, structural designer and construction engineer
- Matvei Kapelyushnikov, mechanical engineer and inventor
- Vyacheslav Nagovitsyn, politician
- Ivan Indinok, politician
- Igor Minin, physicist, faculty
- Oleg Minin, physicist, faculty
- Theodor Molien, Baltic-German mathematician, faculty
- Andrey Kryachkov, architect, faculty
- Sergey Psakhie, physicist, faculty

=== Rectors ===
The following have been rectors of the university:

- 1899-1907 Efim Zubashev, Rector of Tomsk Technological Institute of Emperor Nicholas II
- 1907-1911 Vladimir Alekseevsky, Rector of Tomsk Technological Institute of Emperor Nicholas II
- 1911-1916 Nikolay Kartashev, Rector of Tomsk Technological Institute of Emperor Nicholas II.
- 1916-1919 Ivan Bobarykov, Rector of Tomsk Technological Institute of Emperor Nicholas II and Tomsk Technological Institute.
- 1919-1920 Alexander Ugarov, Rector of Tomsk Technological Institute
- 1920-1921 Yakov Mikhailenko, Rector of Tomsk Technological Institute.
- 1921-1930 Nikolay Gutovsky, Rector of Tomsk Technological Institute and Dzerzhinsky Siberian Technological Institute
- 1930-1934 Sergey Kalmykov, Rector of Dzerzhinsky Siberian Technological Institute
- 1934-1936 Alexey Kashkin, Rector of Kirov Tomsk Industrial Institute
- 1936-1937 Alexander Nesterov, Rector of Kirov Tomsk Industrial Institute
- 1937-1938 Dmitry Garshenin, Rector of Kirov Tomsk Industrial Institute
- 1939-1944 Konstantin Shmargunov, Rector of Kirov Tomsk Industrial Institute
- 1944-1970 Alexander Vorobyev, Rector of Kirov Tomsk Polytechnic Institute.
- 1970-1981 Ivan Kalyatsky, Rector of Kirov Tomsk Polytechnic Institute
- 1981-1990 Ivan Chuchalin, Rector of Kirov Tomsk Polytechnic Institute.
- 1990-2008 Yury Pokholkov, rector of Tomsk Polytechnic Institute and TPU.
- 2009-2019 Petr Chubik, rector of National Research TPU
- 2019-2020 Victor Demin, acting rector of National Research TPU
- 2020-2021 Andrey Yakovlev, acting rector of National Research TPU
- 2021 to present Dmitry Sednev, acting rector of National Research TPU

== Gallery ==
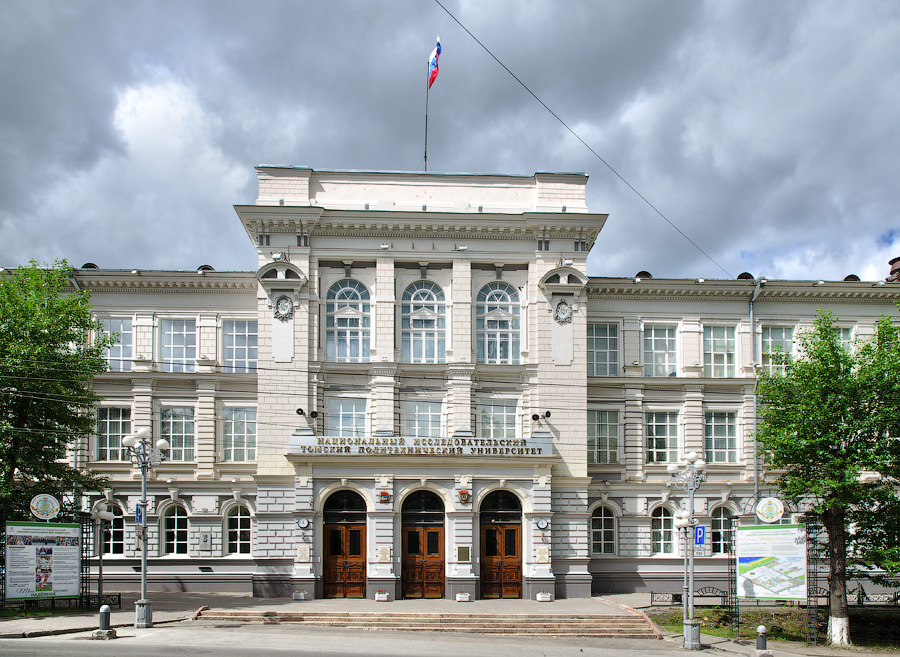
TPU main building

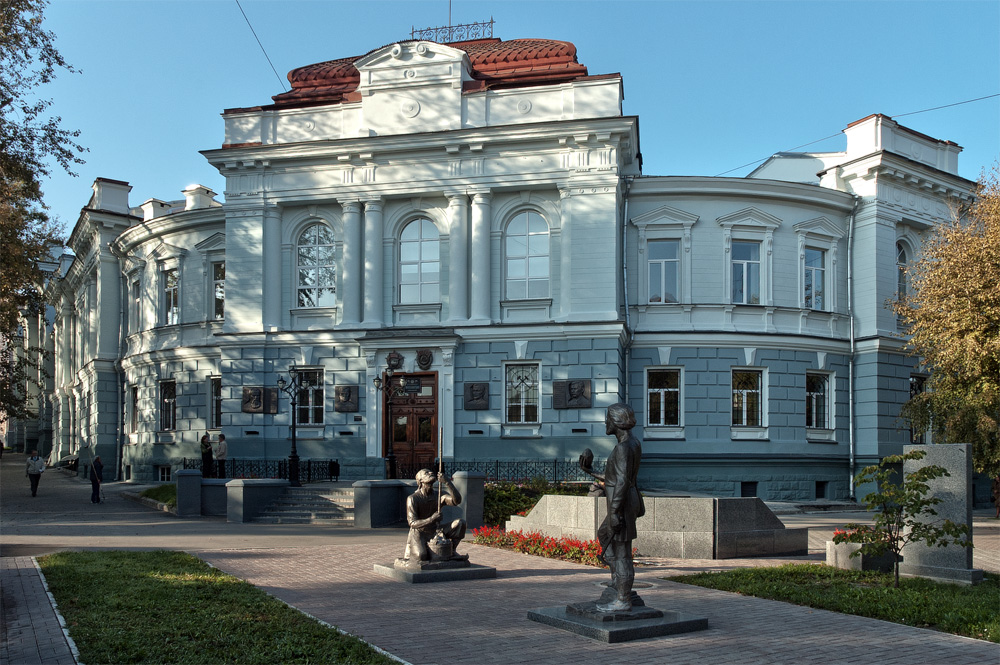
TPU academic building No. 1 (the former Mining Department)

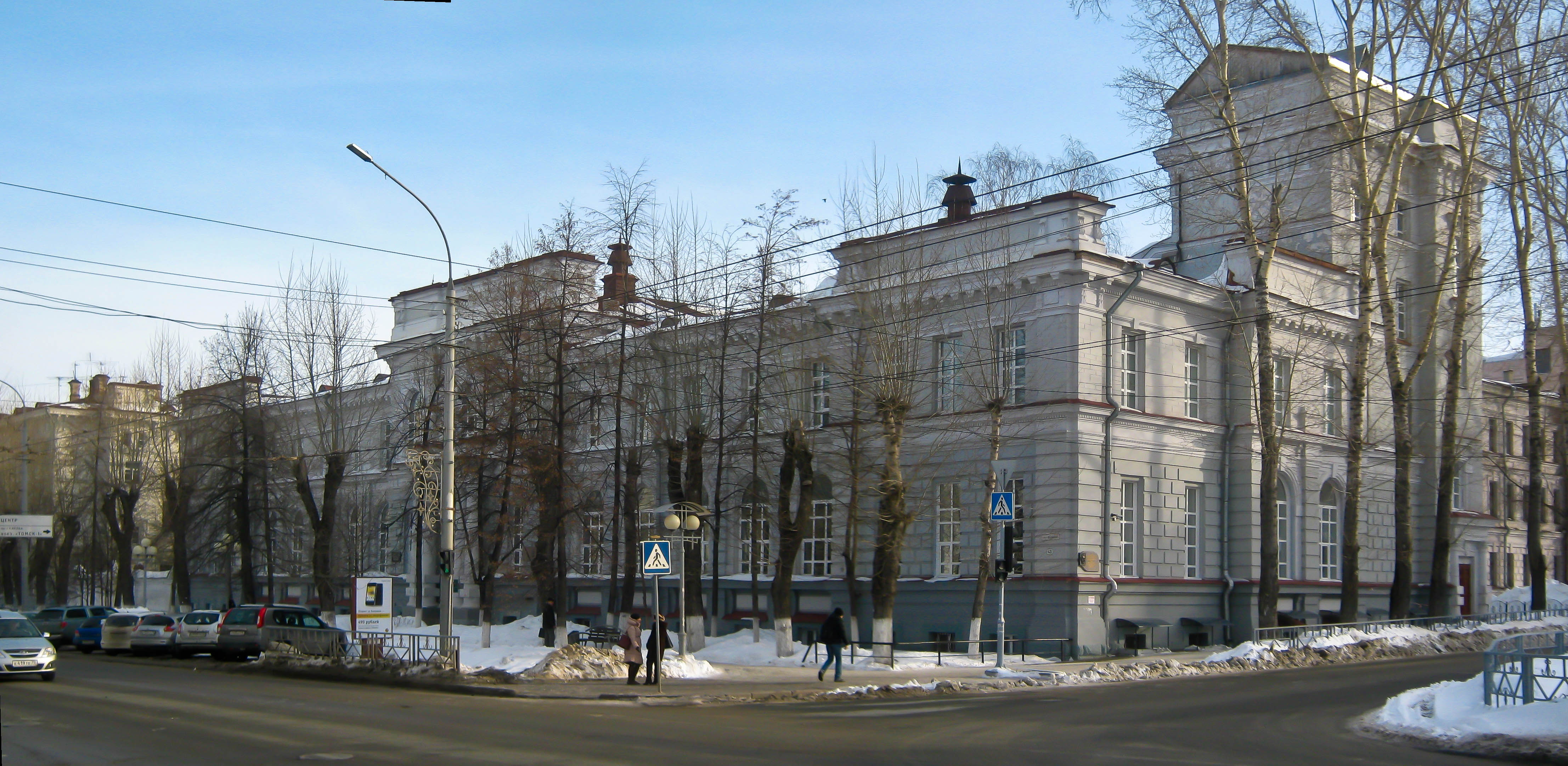
TPU academic building No. 3 (the former Physical Department)

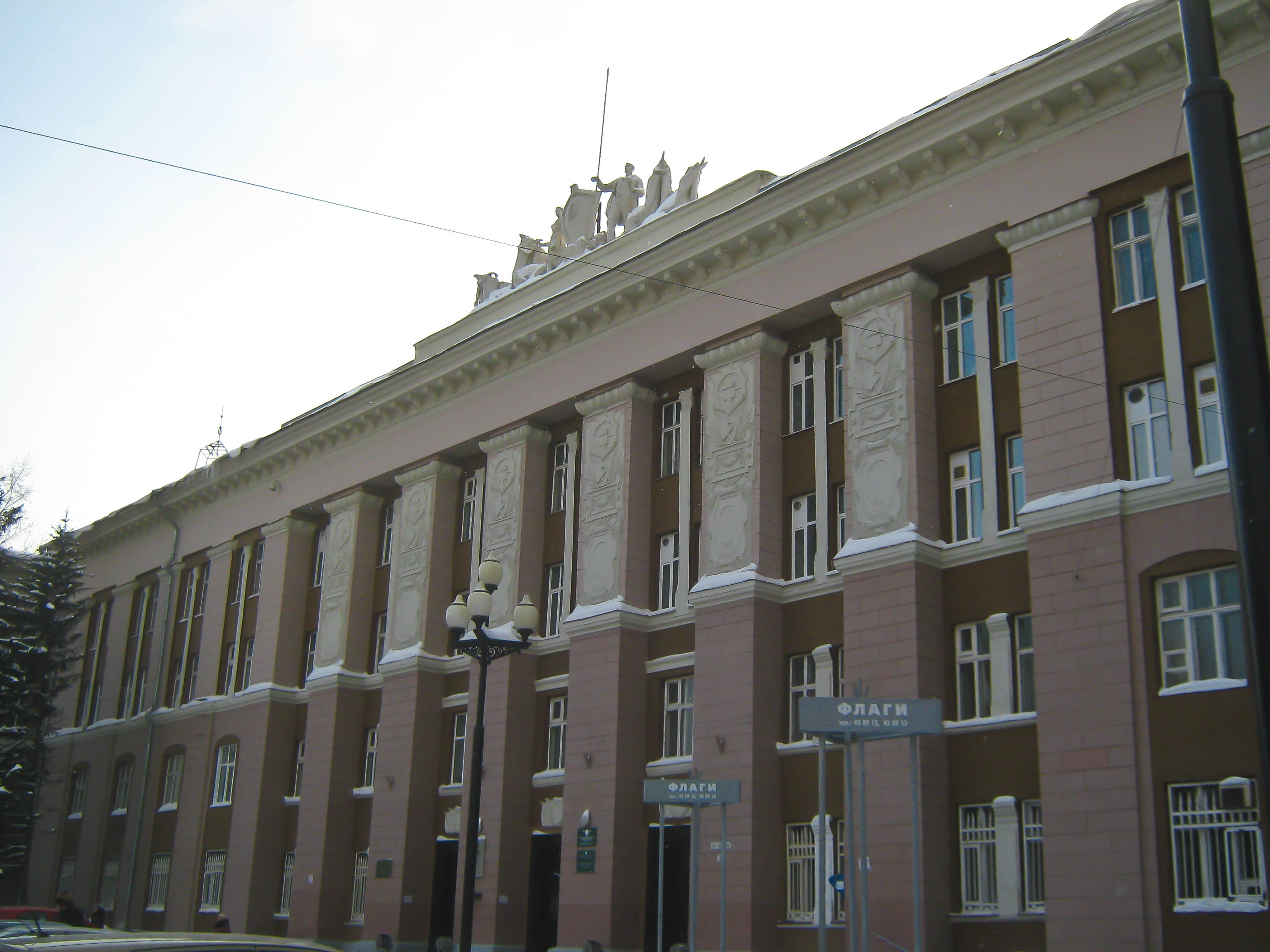
TPU academic building No. 10

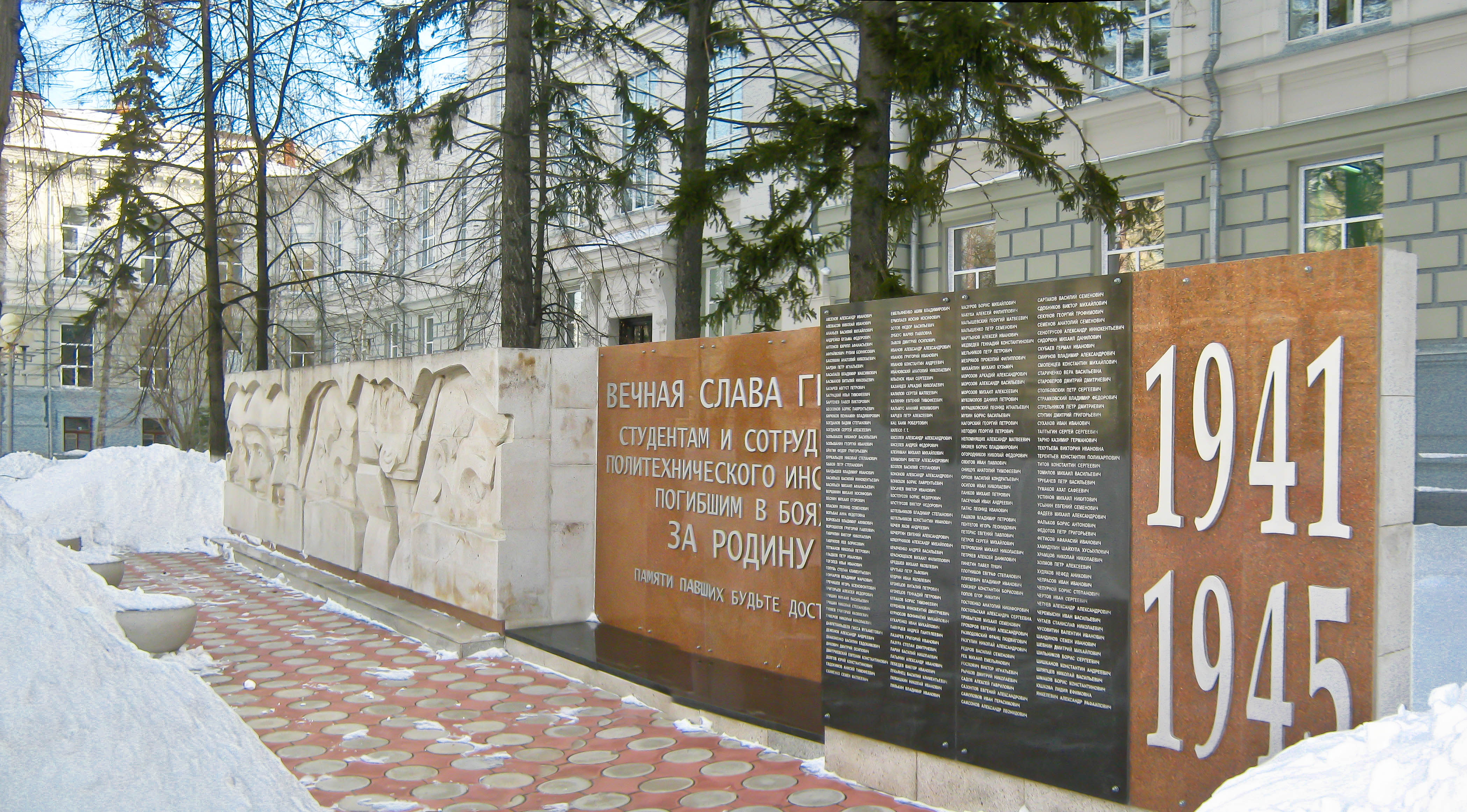
Memorial to TPU fallen staff during the battles at the Eastern Front of World War II

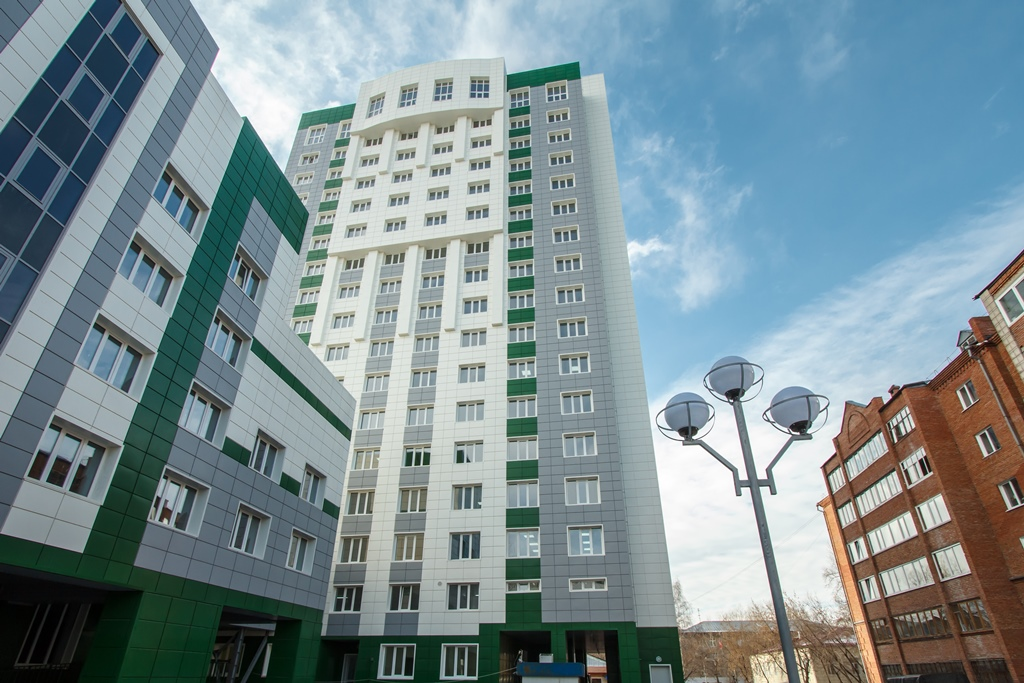
The TPU campus was recognized the best in Russia (2016 contest by the Ministry of Education and Science of the Russian Federation)

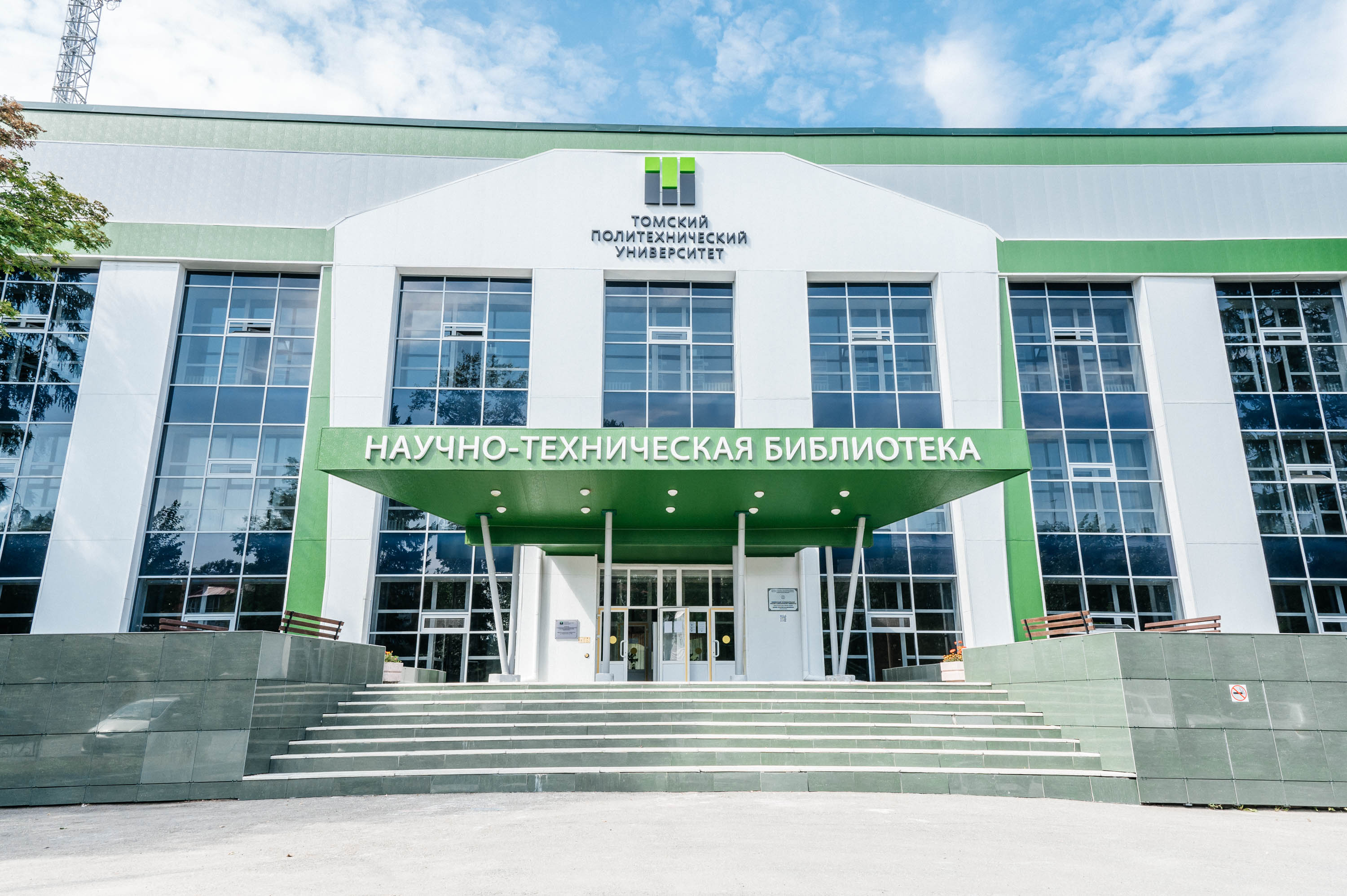
TPU Science and Technical Library, 2020

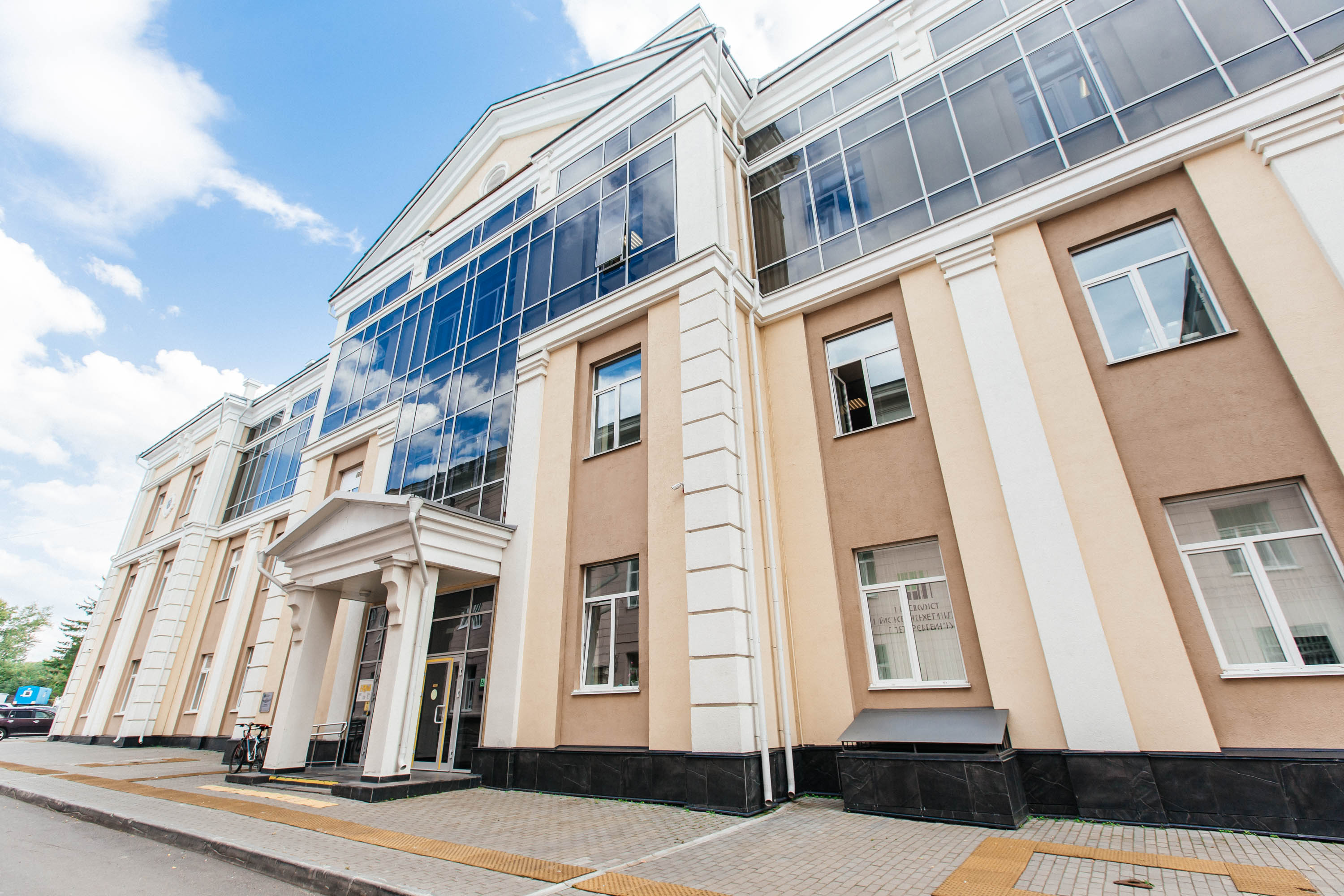
TPU Science Park

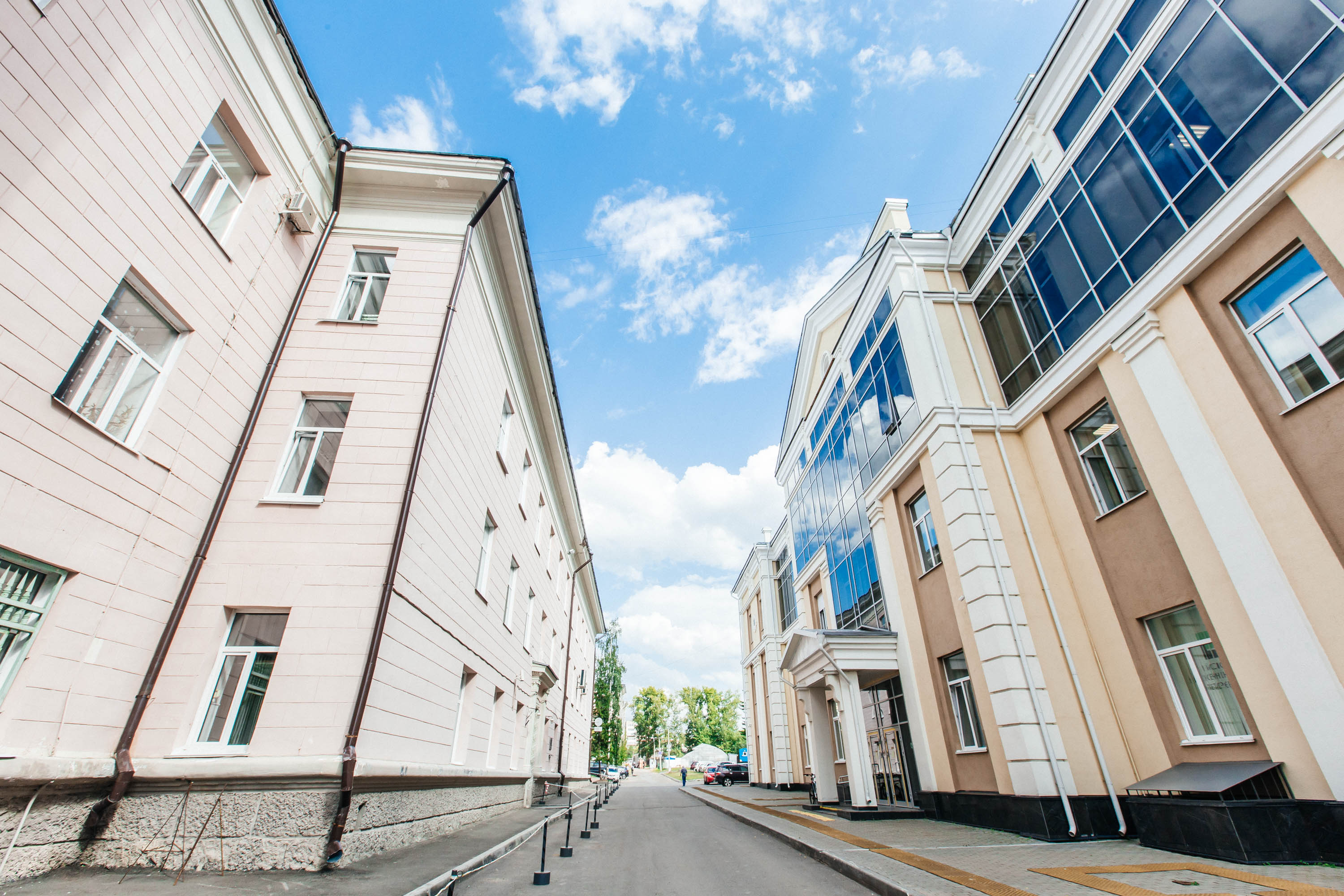
TPU Science Park and academic building No. 11

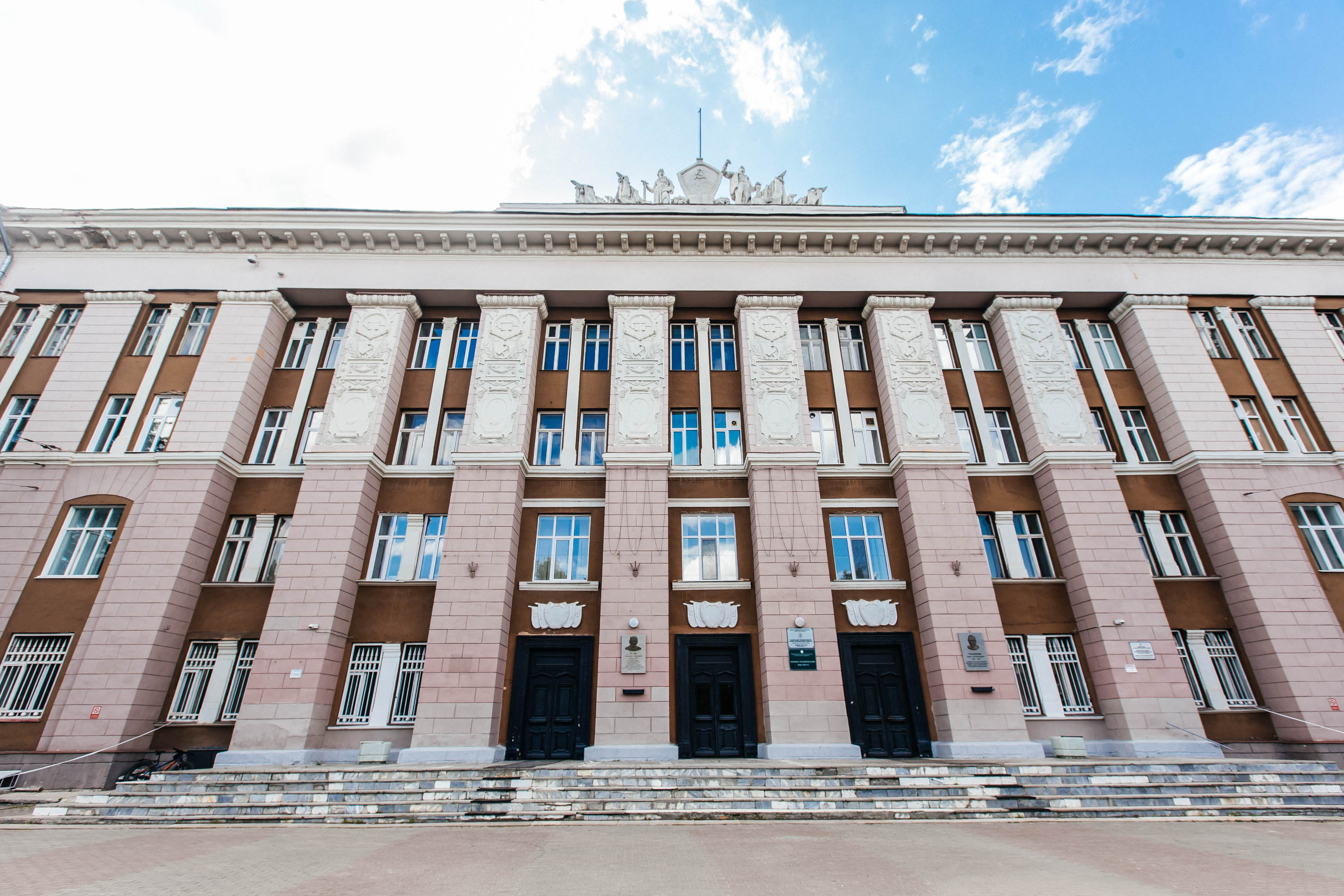
TPU academic building No. 10
