= Igor Minin =

Soviet physicist

Igor V. Minin
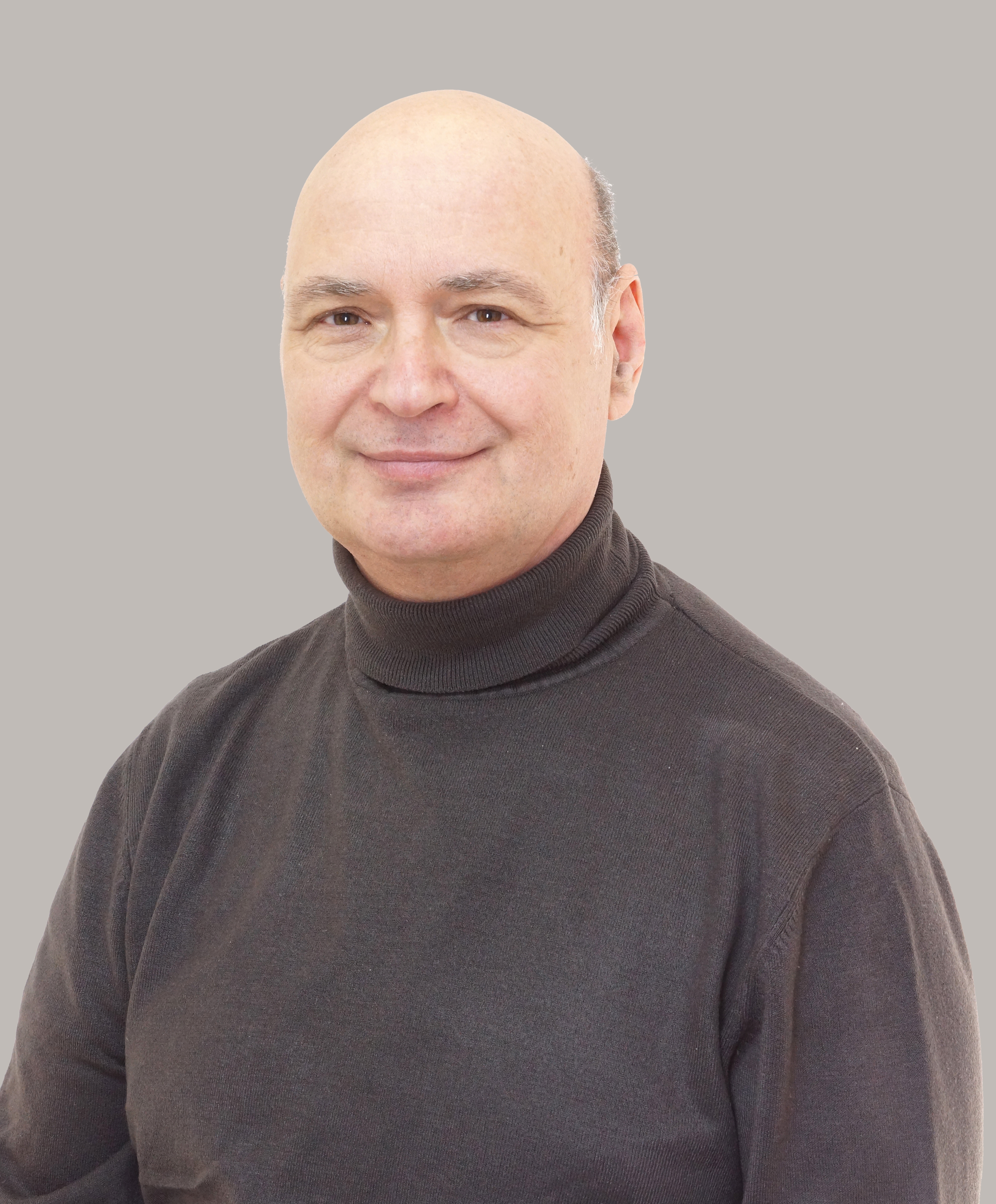
- Igor V. Minin
- Born: 22 March 1960 (age 66); Akademgorodok, Novosibirsk
- Citizenship: Russia
- Education: Novosibirsk State University
- Scientific career
- Fields: Physicist, Radiophysics, Photonics, Terahertz technology
- Workplaces: Tomsk Polytechnic University

Igor V. Minin (Russian: Игорь Владиленович Минин) (born 22 March 1960 in Akademgorodok, Novosibirsk), is a Russian physicist, corresponding member of the Russian Academy of Metrology, and a full professor of Physics at Tomsk Polytechnic University. He became known for his contributions to new directions in optical physics: terahertz 3D imaging, Mesotronics (mesoscale photonics), and subwavelength structured light, including acoustics and surface plasmon, as well as in high energy density physics.

== Biography ==
Minin received his M.S. from Novosibirsk State University in 1982 and earned his Ph.D. Physics and Mathematics, specializing in radiophysics and quantum physics, from St. Petersburg Electrotechnical Institute in 1986.

From 1981 to 1982 Minin worked part-time as a laboratory assistant at the Institute of Applied Physics in Akademgorodok that had been founded by his father, Vladilen F. Minin, in 1966.

In March 2004, he defended his thesis for the advanced degree of Doctor of Technical Sciences, equivalent to a Habilitation degree.

Minin published several research monographs, including "Diffractional Optics of Millimetre Waves", "Basic Principles of Fresnel Antenna Arrays" and later "Diffractive Optics and Nanophotonics: Resolution Below the Diffraction Limit" and "The photonic hook: from Optics to Acoustics and Plasmonics". Most of Minin's research was carried out with his twin brother Oleg V. Minin.

In April 2007, the FSB of Russia accused the Minin twins of revealing state secrets and sensitive information about research projects for the Ministry of Defence (Russia), following the publication of a book dedicated to the 40th anniversary of the Novosibirsk Institute of Applied Physics. This case was widely publicized, well-known scientists and human rights activists spoke out in defense of the physics brothers. FSB investigators dropped their case against brothers, and prosecutors in Novosibirsk issued a rare apology to the scientists in July 2007.

Since Perestroika Minin had been a visiting professor at multiple institutes internationally, including: DaimlerChrysler AG, Doiche Aerospace, Technische Universitat Munchen (Germany), Harbin Institute of Technology, MMW State Key Lab, Nanjing, Beijing Institute of Technology, Capital Normal University (China), Samsung Electronics (Korea), National University of Singapore, Universidad Technica Federico Santa Maria (Chile) and University of Helsinki (Finland).

== Research ==
Minin is a pioneer in the field of photonic jets generated by an arbitrary 3D shape particles. In collaboration with his brother (twin) Oleg V. Minin 2015 he discovered the so-called photonic hook effect - artificially curved light beams with subwavelength curvature and beamwidth. Minin also experimentally demonstrated the existence of Acoustics and surface plasmon photonic jet and photonic hook phenomena.

In dielectric structures with a Mie size parameter of order ten, which are in the region between the wave and geometric optics, he and his colleagues have discovered some new unusual effects, including super-resonance - the excitation of giant magnetic fields in dielectric mesoscale particles compared with the magnetic field in Neutron star and based on high-order Fano resonance.

With his brother, Minin founded the new field of "freezing droplet optics" with the discovery of unusual time domain effects of photonic hook and Fano resonances. He and his colleagues pioneered the study of the unusual optical properties of superresonance and photonic hooks in and near a rotating cylinder and sphere, based on the optical analogue of Magnus effect.

The presence of a number of interesting applications indicates a new promising direction in optics called "Mesotronics".

Minin has also made new investigations in the study of young stellar objects, active galactic nuclei and astrophysical jets by the analysis of pulse plasma jets produced by intense laser-matter interactions.

Minin is author or coauthor of over 450 research publications, including 22 monographs (12 in Russian, 9 in English and 1 in Chinese) and more than 200 patents. He is an editorial member of several international journals and chair of several international conferences.

== Awards ==
- For his contribution to the theory of hypercumulation, Minin was awarded the medal of the Russian National Committee on Theoretical and Applied Mechanics of Russian Academy of Sciences named after Kh.A. Rakhmatulin in 2013.
- Russian medals named after V.I. Vernadsky and A. Nobel.

== Selected papers ==
- Minin O.V. and Minin I.V. Diffractional Optics of Millimetre Waves, lOP Publisher, 2004. 396 p. ISBN 9780367454326
- Minin I.V. and Minin O.V. Basic Principles of Fresnel Antenna Arrays, Springer, 2008. ISBN 978-3-540-79559-9
- Minin I.V. and Minin O.V. Diffractive Optics and Nanophotonics: Resolution Below the Diffraction Limit, Springer, 2016. ISBN 978-3-319-24251-4
- Minin V. F., Minin I.V. and Minin O.V. Computational Fluid Dynamics, (2011).
- Igor Minin, Igor Minin; Oleg Minin, Oleg Minin (2014). "3D dif fractive lenses to overcome the 3D Abbe subwavelength diffraction limit". Chinese Optics Letters. 12 (6). Shanghai Institute of Optics and Fine Mechanics: 060014–60016. Bibcode:2014ChOpL..12f0014M. doi:10.3788/col201412.060014. ISSN 1671-7694.
- Pacheco-Peña, V.; Beruete, M.; Minin, I. V.; Minin, O. V. (2014-08-25). "Terajets produced by dielectric cuboids". Applied Physics Letters. 105 (8). AIP Publishing: 084102. arXiv:1408.1212. Bibcode:2014ApPhL.105h4102P. doi:10.1063/1.4894243. hdl:2454/21071. ISSN 0003-6951. S2CID 54542012.
- Luk'yanchuk, Boris S.; Paniagua-Domínguez, Ramón; Minin, Igor; Minin, Oleg; Wang, Zengbo (2017-05-11). "Refractive index less than two: photonic nanojets yesterday, today and tomorrow [Invited]". Optical Materials Express. 7 (6). The Optical Society: 1820. Bibcode:2017OMExp...7.1820L. doi:10.1364/ome.7.001820. ISSN 2159-3930.
- Nguyen Pham, Hai Huy; Hisatake, Shintaro; Minin, Oleg Vladilenovich; Nagatsuma, Tadao; Minin, Igor Vladilenovich (2017). "Enhancement of spatial resolution of terahertz imaging systems based on terajet generation by dielectric cube". APL Photonics. 2 (5). AIP Publishing: 056106. Bibcode:2017APLP....2e6106N. doi:10.1063/1.4983114. ISSN 2378-0967.
- Minin, I. V.; Minin, O. V.; Katyba, G. M.; Chernomyrdin, N. V.; Kurlov, V. N.; Zaytsev, K. I.; Yue, L.; Wang, Z.; Christodoulides, D. N. (2019-01-21). "Experimental observation of a photonic hook". Applied Physics Letters. 114 (3). AIP Publishing: 031105. arXiv:1809.05406. Bibcode:2019ApPhL.114c1105M. doi:10.1063/1.5065899. ISSN 0003-6951. S2CID 119468378.
- Rubio, Constanza; Tarrazó-Serrano, Daniel; Minin, Oleg V.; Uris, Antonio; Minin, Igor V. (2020). "Acoustical hooks: A new subwavelength self-bending beam". Results in Physics. 16 102921. Elsevier BV. arXiv:1906.02148. Bibcode:2020ResPh..1602921R. doi:10.1016/j.rinp.2019.102921. ISSN 2211-3797. S2CID 174799549.
