= Petr Chubik =

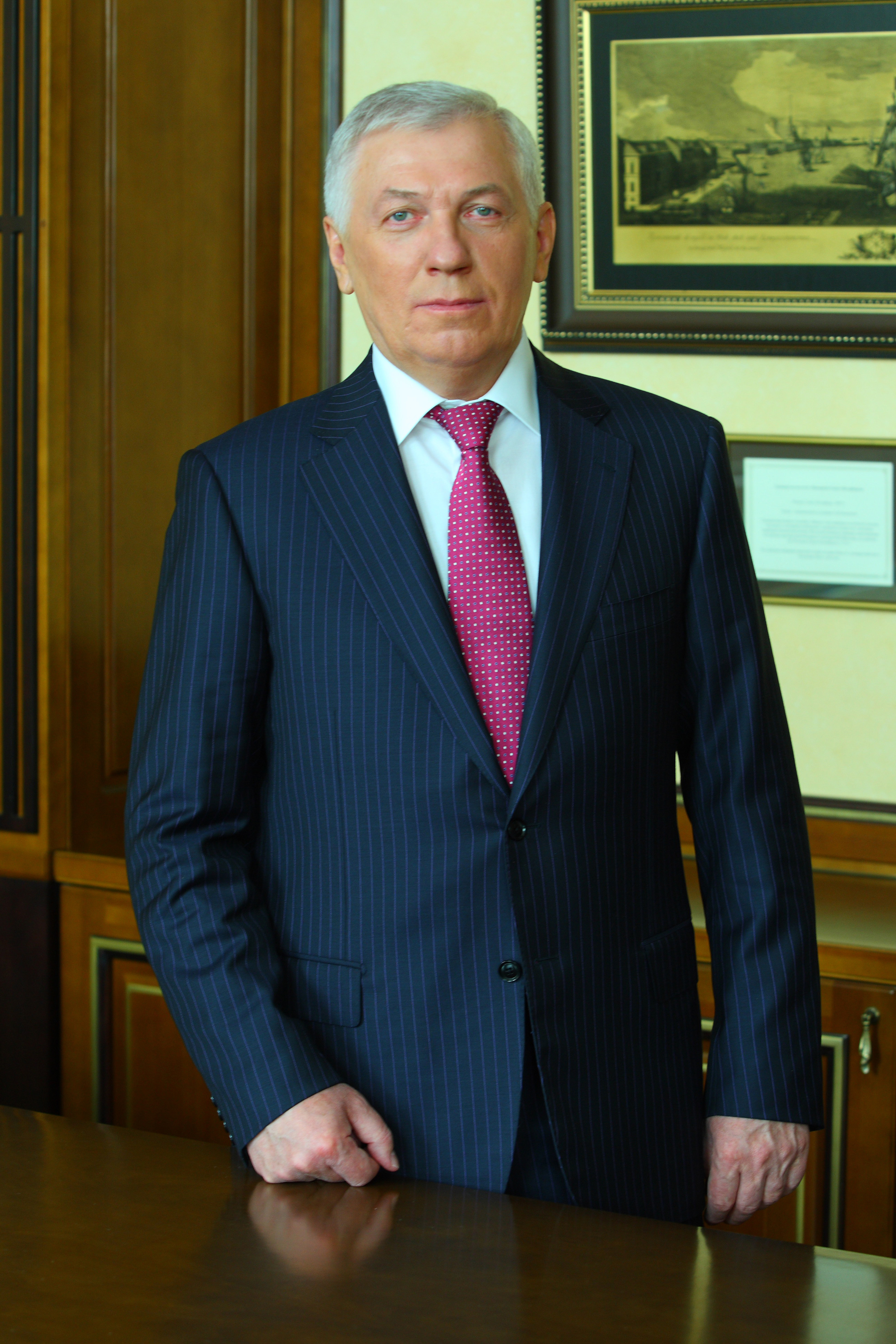
- Born: Petr Savelyevich Chubik; 7 July 1954; Krasnoyarsk region
- Education: Tomsk Polytechnic University
- Known for: rector Tomsk Polytechnic University
- Scientific career
- Fields: Geology, Petroleum Engineering, Higher Education

Petr Savelyevich Chubik (born July 7, 1954, in Krasnoyarsk region) – Since 2008 Rector of Tomsk Polytechnic University. He is a specialist in drilling cleaning fluids. Vice-president of the Association for Engineering Education of Russia, Vice-President of the Association of Technical Universities, Chairman of the Association "Tomsk consortium of scientific, educational and research institutions", member of the International Academy of Science of Higher Education and the Russian Academy of Russian Engineering. Co-Chair of the Board of the Association Consortium of supporting universities of the State Corporation "Rosatom", a member of the Board of the Association of the leading universities of Russia, member of the advisory council to the deputy governor of Tomsk region on scientific, educational complex and innovation policy. Member of the party "United Russia".

== Biography ==
Petr Chubik was born July 7, 1954, in the village of Nikolsk, Taseevskiy district of Krasnoyarsk region. At school he studied in Osinniki, Kemerovo region. In 1971 he entered the Geological Department of the Tomsk Polytechnic Institute, now TPU. In 1976 he received a degree in mining engineering, "Technology and equipment for mineral exploration". He has worked at TPU since 1976, immediately after graduation.

He was an engineer of research sector, assistant, senior lecturer and assistant professor of art exploration of mineral deposits.

1995–1999 – Deputy Head of the Department of drilling oil and gas wells.

1999–2001 – Dean of the Faculty of geological survey and oil and gas exploration.

2001–2003 – Vice-Rector of Academic Affairs.

2001–2003 – Professor of the Department of drilling oil and gas wells.

2003–2005 – Head of the Institute of Geology and Petroleum Engineering.

April 2005 – September 2008 – Deputy Governor of Tomsk region for human resources.

12 September – 29 December – Acting rector of Tomsk Polytechnic University.

Since 30 December – Rector of Tomsk Polytechnic University.

Since 5 September 2014 – He was elected as expert of the Expert Council at the Russian Federation Government.

== Scientific activities ==
1987 – defended PhD dissertation Optimizing of drilling fluids quality during the drilling of exploration wells using diamond rock cutting tool in complex geological conditions in Leningrad University of Mines (today National Mineral Resources University).

2000 – defended Doctorate degree dissertation Scientific framework for optimizing the quality of drilling fluids.

Research fields: Improving the quality of education and the impact of research activities of universities, greening and optimization of the quality of drilling fluids.

One of the leading Russian experts in the field of drilling fluids. Author and co-author of 250 scientific papers, including 8 monographs, textbooks and teaching aids 6, 9 inventions.

== Awards ==
State: the Order of Merit (2009), Prize of the Russian Federation in the field of education (2011), letter of gratitude of the Government of the Russian Federation (2014).

Industry: "Excellent geological survey" (1996), "Honorary Worker of Higher Professional Education of the Russian Federation" (2001), "Miner's Glory» II (2011) and III (2001), "Honorary geological survey "(2012), badge"for special merits in the development of mineral resources of the Tomsk region "(2014).

Regional: Diploma of Tomsk Region (2008), order "For merits for the Tomsk Region" (2011), the Order of Merit for Kuzbass (2012), the medal "For Achievements" (2014), the medal "For personal contribution to the implementation of national projects in the Kuzbass" (2014).

Social: Medal named Yuri Gagarin Space Federation of Russia (2009), honorary silver award "Public Recognition" (2011), winner of the All-Russian competition "Engineer of the Decade" (2012), Medal. Tsiolkovsky Cosmonautics Federation of Russia (2013, 2014), Medal of Peter I «For the development of engineering and education" (2014).

Foreign: Medal "50 Years of the Society of Russian-Vietnamese Friendship"
