= V.E. Zuev Institute of Atmospheric Optics =

Soviet-Russian research organization

The V.E. Zuev Institute of Atmospheric Optics is a Russian research organisation based in Tomsk. Its purpose is to study the atmosphere. The Laboratory of Optical Signals Propagation gathers satellite data on aerosols, ozone, and Earth reflectivity over Siberia. The Laboratory of Aerosol Optics collects information on temperature, humidity, soot, and atmospheric scattering at Tomsk. The TOR Station measures gas constituents in the atmosphere, including carbon dioxide, carbon monoxide, sulfur dioxide, ozone, nitrogen oxides, methane and hydrogen sulfide at two locations. The Siberian lidar station can measure the temperature in the stratosphere and troposphere. Aerosol particle size is measured by using six different wavelengths for the laser.

The institute was founded in 1969 by Vladimir Yevseyevich Zuev who became its director. The parent organisation was the Laboratory of Infrared Radiations of the Siberian Physical-Technical Institute of the Tomsk State University. A journal is published called Atmospheric and Oceanic Optics.
