= Minin and Pozharsky =

Minin and Pozharsky may refer to:

== Separately ==
- Kuzma Minin, (late 1570s–1616), Russian merchant
- Dmitry Pozharsky, (1577–1642), Russian prince

== Collectively ==
- Monument to Minin and Pozharsky, in Moscow
- Minin and Pozharsky Square, in Nizhny Novgorod
- Minin and Pozharsky (film), a 1939 film
