= Vladilen Minin =

Soviet physicist

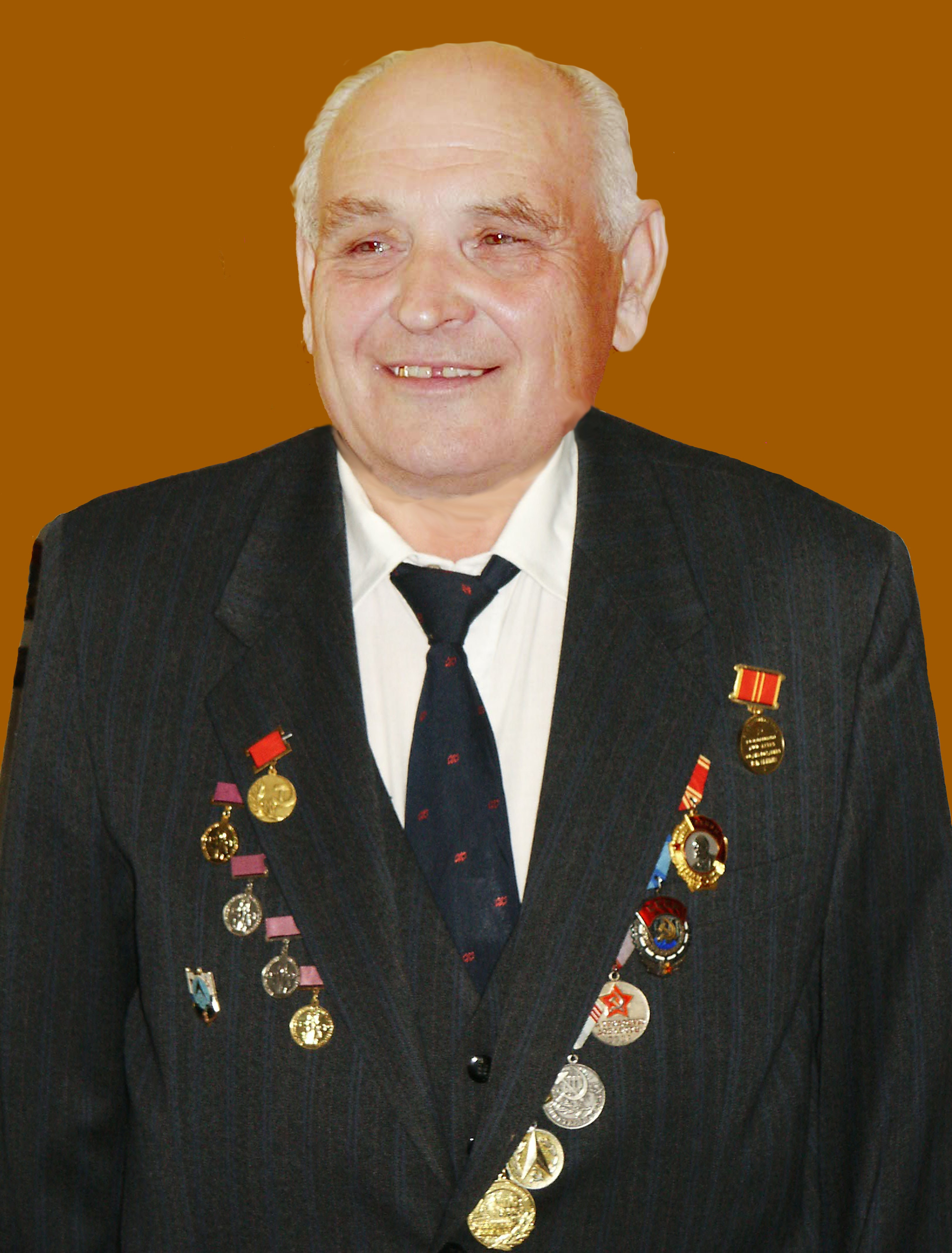
- Born: Vladilen Fyodorovich Minin; May 27, 1932 (age 94); Rudinka, Ryazan Oblast, RSFSR, Soviet Union
- Education: Moscow Institute of Physics and Technology
- Scientific career
- Fields: Radiophysics, explosion physics, math modeling, protection of information
- Workplaces: Institute of Applied Physics (Novosibirsk)

Vladilen Fyodorovich Minin (Russian: Влади́лен Фёдорович Ми́нин; born 27 May 1932, Rudinka, Ryazan Oblast) is a Soviet and Russian physicist, Doctor of Technical Sciences, a professor, a member of the Academy of Technological Sciences of the Russian Federation. He was the founder, general director and chief designer of the Institute of Applied Physics (1966-1996), the founder and president of the Urals-Siberian Branch of Russian Academy of Technological Sciences. He developed air- and navy- launched missiles, custom control and safety systems and computer equipment.

== Biography ==
He was born to a family of teachers in the village of Rudinka, Ryazan Oblast. Later the Minin family moved to Nagishy (Lebyazhy Usad) of Gorlovka village settlement in Skopin district of Ryazan Oblast. After his father's return from the Second World War, the Minin family moved to Moscow. Vladilen finished secondary school for working youth No. 77 in Stalin district of Moscow, then he studied in industrial school No. 40 to become a metal turner. He worked as a turner at the plant, then as a lab assistant in science classrooms of the school for working youth and taught physics to militiamen.

=== Alma mater ===
V.Minin graduated from Moscow Institute of Physics and Technology. His graduate work was devoted to the research of a high-voltage electric discharge in liquid. V.S. Komelkov (one of the chief of the Department of Atomic Energy Institute) who refereed his theses and later offered him the work in his department.

=== Siberian Branch of the Russian Academy of Sciences ===
In 1958, at the invitation of Mikhail Lavrentyev, Minin moved to Novosibirsk Akademgorodok (scientific centre) to work at Lavrentyev Institute of Hydrodynamics of the Siberian Branch of the Russian Academy of Sciences. He initiated some new research directions : electromagnetic throwing of the body, shock waves interaction with bubbles in water with air layers, anomalous properties of nitrogen plasma, explosive sound sources, explosion plume, etc. At that time the research in these fields was not being conducted in any other laboratory of the Institute of Hydrodynamics.

He discovered the effect of the cumulative jet formation when a gas bubble collapses under the action of a shock wave and proposed a method for dissolving gases in a liquid based on this effect.

In 2005 professor Christopher Earls Brennen published his monograph «Cavitation and Bubble Dynamics» where special focus was given to the research of shock waves interaction with gas bubbles in water and experimental discovery of cumulative jet formation effect in case of bubble collapse conducted by Minin.

Minin initiated a new direction for the research, i.e. experimental study of solitary wave propagation features in the shallows as applied to tsunami.

In 1959 (by the order of Lavrentyev) Minin was appointed the chief engineer to be responsible for the construction and provision of scientific instruments made in his laboratory not only for the Institute of Hydrodynamics, but also for other institutes to-be-built for the Siberian Branch of Russian Academy of Sciences.

In 1961 Minin passed his defense for a degree of a candidate of technical sciences. In his theses he offered to apply explosion for low-soluble gas dilution in water.

In 1963 Minin was conferred a degree of a senior research assistant in chemical physics of the Academy of Sciences of the Soviet Union.

In 1963-1964 he started working on branch-oriented optoelectronic systems.

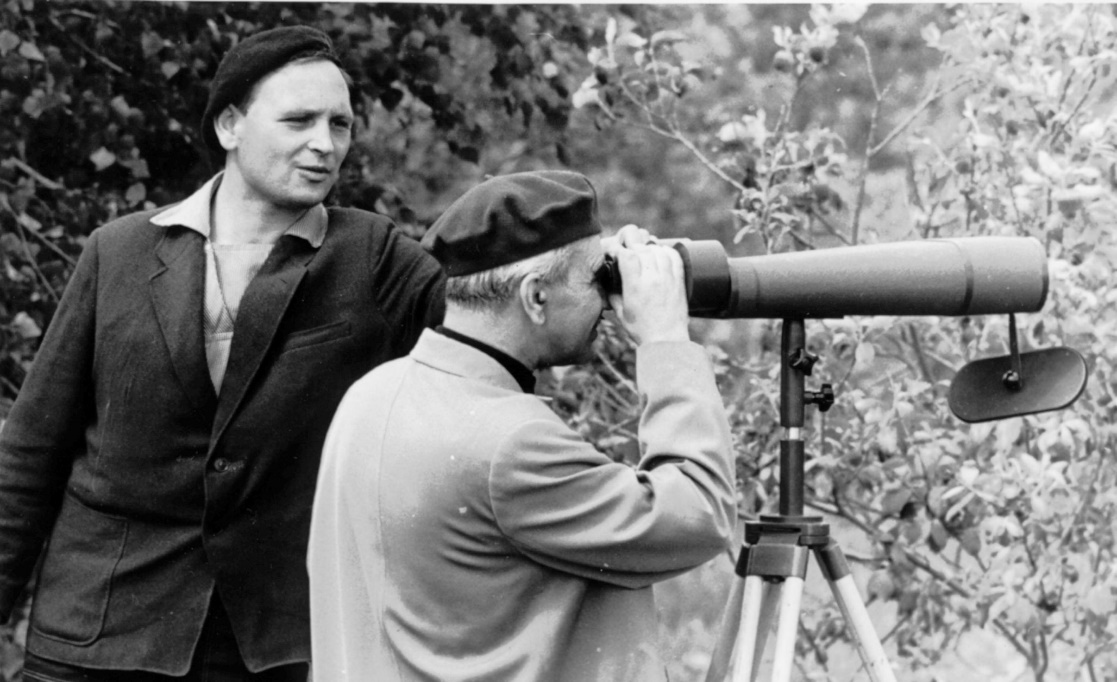
Vladilen Minin and Mstislav Keldysh (President of the Academy of Sciences of the Soviet Union) testing “Teplo”

At the same period he delivered lectures to his first students at the preliminary courses of Novosibirsk State University. Later he was invited by Vice-rector Rem Soloukhin to take part in establishing demonstration hall for the Department of General Physics and practical physics. Over 100 demonstration scenarios for a course in physics were made by Minin. In 1959-1969 he worked as an associate professor at the Department of General Physics.

=== Institute of Applied Physics ===
In 1966 Minin established a State Special Design Bureau (later renamed into “Sosna”) for radio-electronic solutions. In 1968 the bureau was reorganized into the Institute of Applied Physics and he became the head of it. He was to mobilize various institutes of the Siberian Branch of Russian Academy of Sciences around common work on diversification and branch-oriented fundamental research and pilot works.

In 1973 the Institute proceeded with the execution of additional objectives set by the head organization of the Ministry of Machine-Building i.e. development of aircraft-launch rockets. At the same time (the period of preparation for Moscow 1980 Summer Olympic Games) by the government order the Institute was to develop and produce the series of X-ray security systems, explosive detectors (a range of gas analyzers М01, М02) and explosion-proof facilities and other systems.

In the late 1970s – the early 1980s joint works with the laboratory of millimeter and submillimeter-wave metrics (Institute of Radio Engineering and Electronics of Academy of Sciences of the Soviet Union) were started. These were the research works on millimeter and submillimeter wave range for transmission and reflection spectra of the explosives and their simulators. For the first time measurements of their spectral characteristics were determined. Collaborative works directed by V.F. Minin were started to develop high-quality non-aberrational quasi-optical lens of submillimeter-wave range on the basis of theoretical insights and the unique equipment of the Institute of Applied Physics. They were used for producing image visualization systems with regard to weapon detection in a human body as well as for producing a submillimeter microscope.

At the same period pioneering investigations were carried out as concerns the effects of anomalous back scattering of dielectric particles and aerospace monitoring of the environment (1970s – 1980s).

For more than 30 years (up to 1996) Minin was a scientific advisor, general director and chief designer of the Institute of Applied Physics.

Over 70 types of armaments families were created under the guidance of Minin, in particular, those for the navy (passive decoy projectiles, optoelectronic systems for PK-2 (Russian:ПК-2), PK-10 (Russian:ПК-10), PK-16 (Russian:ПК-16) complexes and others), air force and army of the USSR and Russian Federation (aircraft launch rockets S-8, S-13 family and others). Some of them have no analogues in the world up to now and are used as a basis for further modifications.

Minin was also at the head of the research works for developing the techniques and algorithms for numerical simulation of physical and mechanical processes. The research conducted for the development of hardware and software formed the basis for automated computing complexes.

Minin was elected a member of the presidium of the regional branch of Siberia and the Far East of the Scientific Council of the Academy of Sciences of the Soviet Union as regards a complex problem of “Mathematical simulation” and a member of Novosibirsk territorial coordination Council for science, vocational education and policy in science and technology.

In the field of numerical techniques and algorithmization he was in charge of the research on creating efficient machine-dependent techniques and algorithms for numerical simulation of the mechanics of continua processes.

Being in charge of the investigations Minin took part in the works on adaptation of the developed algorithms and creation of the brand new parallel ones for numerical simulation, implemented on the basis of upgraded 128-processor machine PS-2000 as all-in-one decision field. Together with the display stations “Gamma” type it is incorporated in general simulation complex. This system which had no analogues in the USSR made it possible to simulate various significant nonstationary processes of the mechanics of continua. By 1990-91 all the TV centres of the USSR were equipped with video-computer graphic stations GAMMA-T.

By means of the developed software-hardware complex the problems of meteoroid protection for spaceship “Vega” (in “Vega-Galley” project) were solved. Pioneering works on cosmogenic safety and Earth protection against asteroids were conducted.

In physics of high-speed processes Minin solved the problem of rotating cumulative charges. He also presented and gave proof of hypercumulative charges.

In the field of cumulative charges in 1969 V.F. Minin received the first empirical results with cylindrical liners. The experiments were conducted at the focal distance equal to the double value of the charge diameter for different masses of explosive charges. Soon afterwards the author's certificate for invention No. 64442 with priority was obtained of 18 June 1970.

The obtained knowledge was applied for making cumulative tandem tank projectile for 2A46. It passed complete cycle of governmental and manufacturer's tests with positive results. Under Minin's guidance the works were conducted on the investigation and production of rotating hollow charge shells with a record depth of penetration.

It was Minin who discovered a new previously unknown field of cumulation, i.e. hypercumulation in which a number of problems have been solved or nearly solved.

Under him pioneering works were conducted in the field of 3D penetrators impact mechanics.

Vladilen Minin is also a co-author of some discoveries in the field of high-speed processes. He developed new methods of magnetic pulse arc welding with high-speed impact of the parts to be fused together and short-time welding process, and applied them to production. The welder developed for aluminum-copper nipples of refrigerator sets and the technique for electric-and-magnetic welding were patented by many countries.

Under his leadership efficient metal casting processes were developed which have no analogues in the world.

For the first time a complex of the radar and optoelectronic close-in jammers “Smeliy” (Brave) PK-16 (Russian:ПК-16)) was produced. A considerable contribution into passive jamming development was made by Minin.

In 1991 Minin was elected a president of the Urals-Siberian Branch of the Academy of Technological Sciences and a member of the Academy Council for new information technologies.

=== Publications ===
He is an author and co-author of over 600 treatises including some monographs, and more than 100 patents and discoveries.

== Family ==
He was married to Inna Aleksandrovna Minina. He has two sons (twins), Oleg and Igor, who are both Doctors of Technical Sciences, university professors, and corresponding members of Russian Academy of Metrology and The Russian Academy of Natural History.

== Awards ==
- Medal "For Labour Valour"(1967).
- Jubilee Medal "In Commemoration of the 100th Anniversary of the Birth of Vladimir Ilyich Lenin" (1970).
- Order of the Red Banner of Labour (1971) – for the foundation of the Institute, professional advancement, research and development work important in special fields of physics.
- Bronze Medal of VDNKH (Exhibition of Achievements of National Economy) of the USSR for the achievements in the development of national economy of the USSR (Certificate 67342, 1974).
- Silver medal of VDNKH (Exhibition of Achievements of National Economy) of the USSR for the achievements in the development of national economy of the USSR (Certificate 10851, 15575, - 1977, 1981).
- Gold medal of VDNKH (Exhibition of Achievements of National Economy) of the USSR for the achievements in the development of national economy of the USSR (Certificate 2756, 1985).
- Order of Lenin (1985) for the foundation of the Institute of Applied Physics and the results achieved in the field of electronic countermeasures establishment.
- Medal "Veteran of Labour" (1987)
- Medal “In commemoration of the 70th anniversary of Cheka – KGB (All-Russian Special Commission for Combating, Counter-revolution, Speculation and Sabotage – Committee for State Security) (1987).
- USSR State Prize (1988) for the complex of work on the production of computer aids and technologies for computing experiment in the field of continuum mechanics.
- Award pin “Honoured Inventor within the USSR”
- Medal ”100th anniversary of Novosibirsk foundation” (2003).
- Medal ”100th anniversary of V.V. Bakhirev, the Minister of machine building” for the achievements in the development of ammunition branch and long-term dedicated work (2016).

== Published works ==
- Minin V.F. (1964). "On explosion on liquid surface". Applied Mechanics and Applied Physics (in Russian) (2).
- Agureykin V.A., Anisimov S.I., Bushman A.V.. Kanel G.I., Karyagin V.P., Konstantinov A.B., Kryukov B.P., Minin V.F., Razorenov S.V., Sagdeyev R.Z., Sugak S.G., Fortov V.E. Thermophysical and gas-dynamic problems of the spacecraft “Vega” meteoroid protection. ТВТ, 22:5 (1984), 964–983 (in Russian).
- Minin V.F., Baybulatov F.H. On the nature of bead lightning. Report, the Academy of sciences of the Soviet Union, 188:4 (1969), 795–798 (in Russian).
- Minin O.V., Minin V.F., Minin I.V. (2013). Magnetic pulse welding (in Russian). Moscow: Palmarium Academic Publishing.
- Minin V.F., Minin I.V, Minin O.V. (2013). Physics of hypercumulation and combined cumulative charges (in Russian). Novosibirsk: “Novopoligraphcentre”. ISBN 978-5-906610-010.
- Minin V.F., Minin I.V., Minin O.V. (2014). "Anisotropic material of cumulative charge liner and its effect on barrier penetration extent". Fundamental Problems of Modern Material Science (in Russian). 11 (2).

== Notes ==
- Who's Who in Science and Engineering [6th Edition(2002—2003)]. Marques. 2003. ISBN 978-0837957609.
- Great biographical encyclopedia (in Russian). biografii.niv.ru. 2009.
