= City Primary School on Krasnoyarskaya Street, Novosibirsk =

Building in Novosibirsk, Russia

City Primary School on Krasnoyarskaya Street
- Городское начальное училище на Красноярской улице
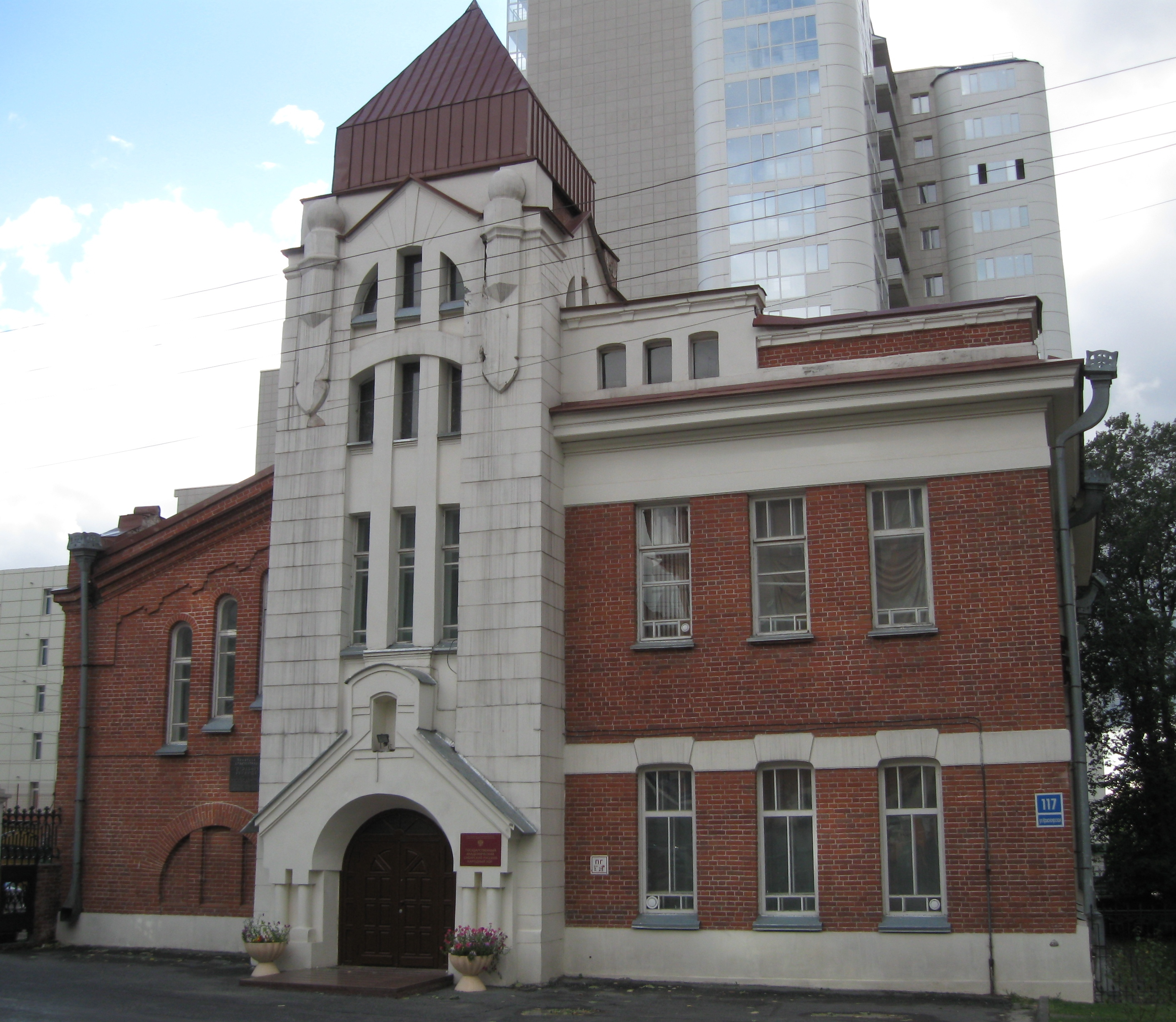
- Interactive map of the City Primary School on Krasnoyarskaya Street area

General information
- Location: Krasnoyarskaya Street 117, Novosibirsk, Russia
- Completed: 1911

Design and construction
- Architect: Andrey Kryachkov

City Primary School on Krasnoyarskaya Street (Russian: Городское начальное училище на Красноярской улице) is a building in Zheleznodorozhny City District of Novosibirsk, Russia. It was built in 1911. Architect: Andrey Kryachkov. The building is located on the corner of Krasnoyarskaya and 1905 Year streets.

== History ==
The City Primary School was constructed by architect Andrey Kryachkov in 1911. It was ordered by the first city head Vladimir Zhernakov.

== Gallery ==
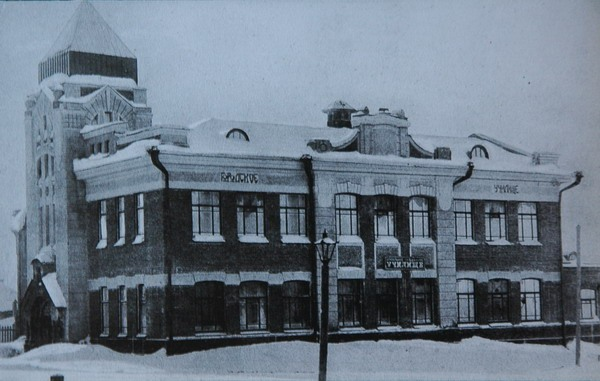

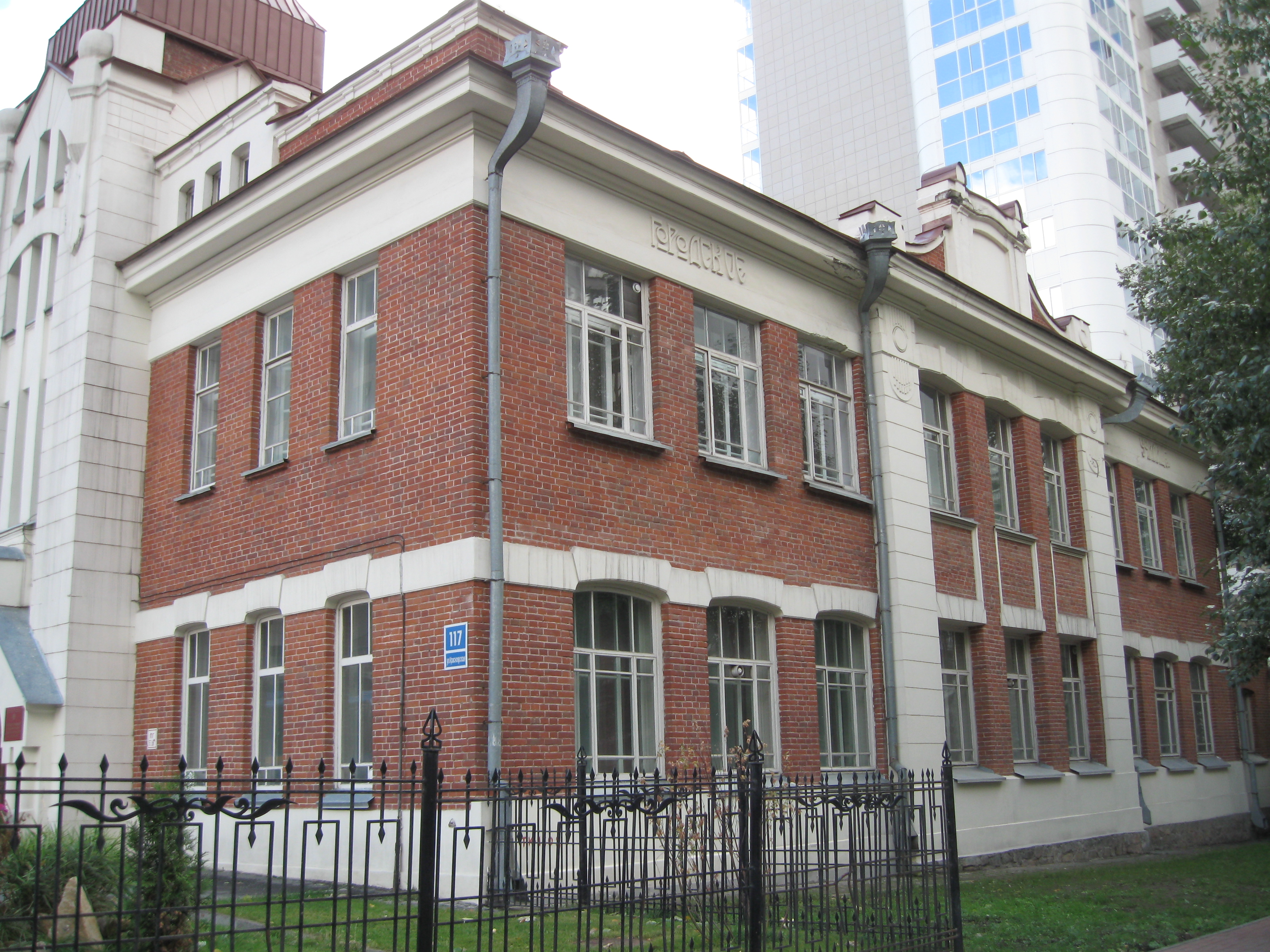

== See also ==
- City Primary School on Lenin Street
