= City Primary School on Lenin Street, Novosibirsk =

Building in Novosibirsk, Russia

City Primary School on Lenin Street
- Городское начальное училище на улице Ленина
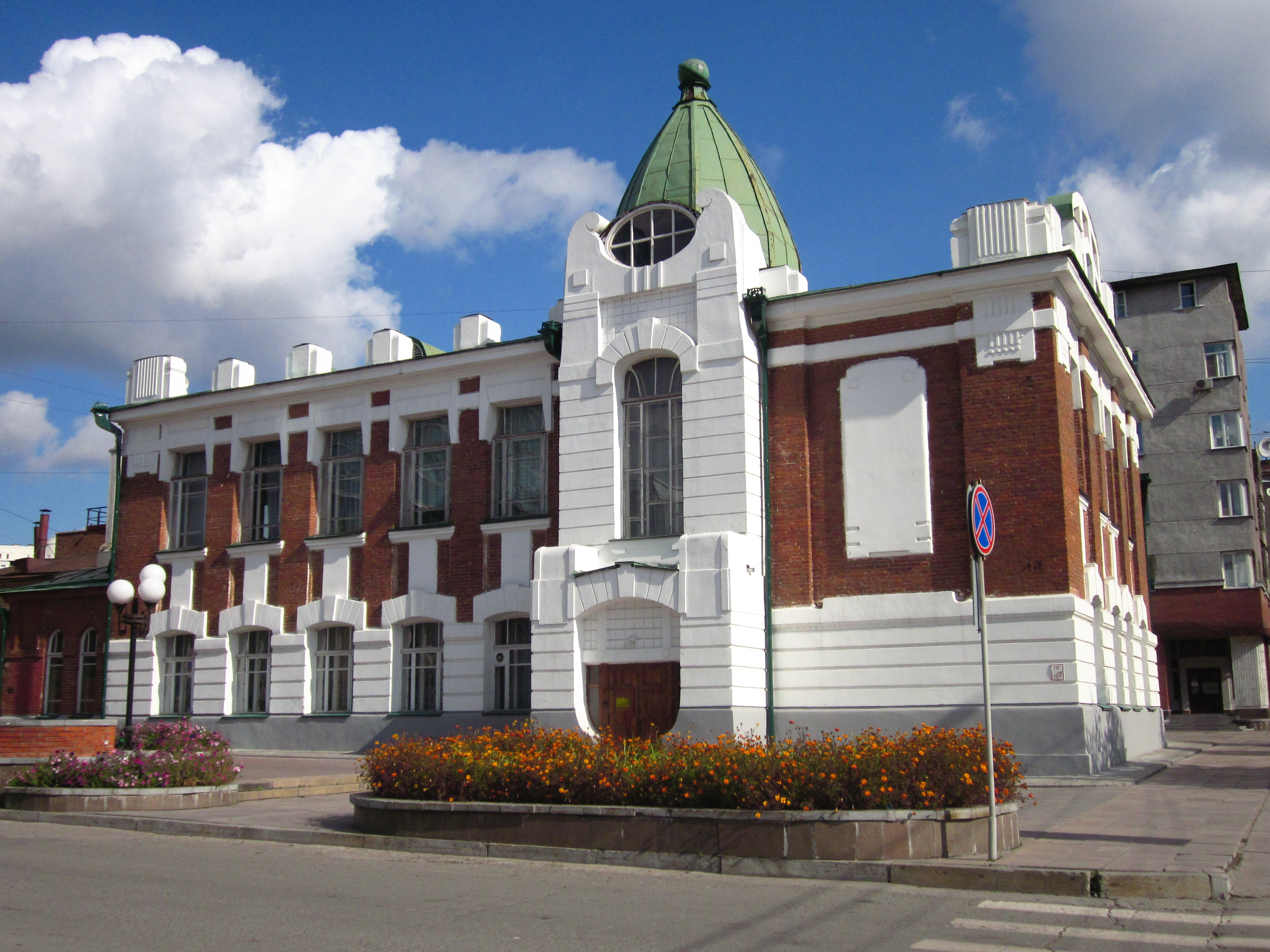
- Interactive map of the City Primary School on Lenin Street area

General information
- Location: Lenin Street 22, Novosibirsk, Russia
- Completed: 1912

Design and construction
- Architect: Andrey Kryachkov

City Primary School on Lenin Street (Russian: Городское начальное училище на улице Ленина) is a building in Zheleznodorozhny City District of Novosibirsk, Russia. It was constructed in 1912. Architect: Andrey Kryachkov. The building is located on the corner of Lenin Street and Street of Revolution.

== History ==
The City Primary School was built by the architect Andrey Kryachkov in 1912.

In 1997, the building was renovated and adapted for the puppet theater.

== See also ==
- City Primary School on Krasnoyarskaya Street
