= Saint Nicholas Chapel, Novosibirsk =

Russian Orthodox chapel in Novosibirsk, Russia

Saint Nicholas Chapel Часовня Святого Николая
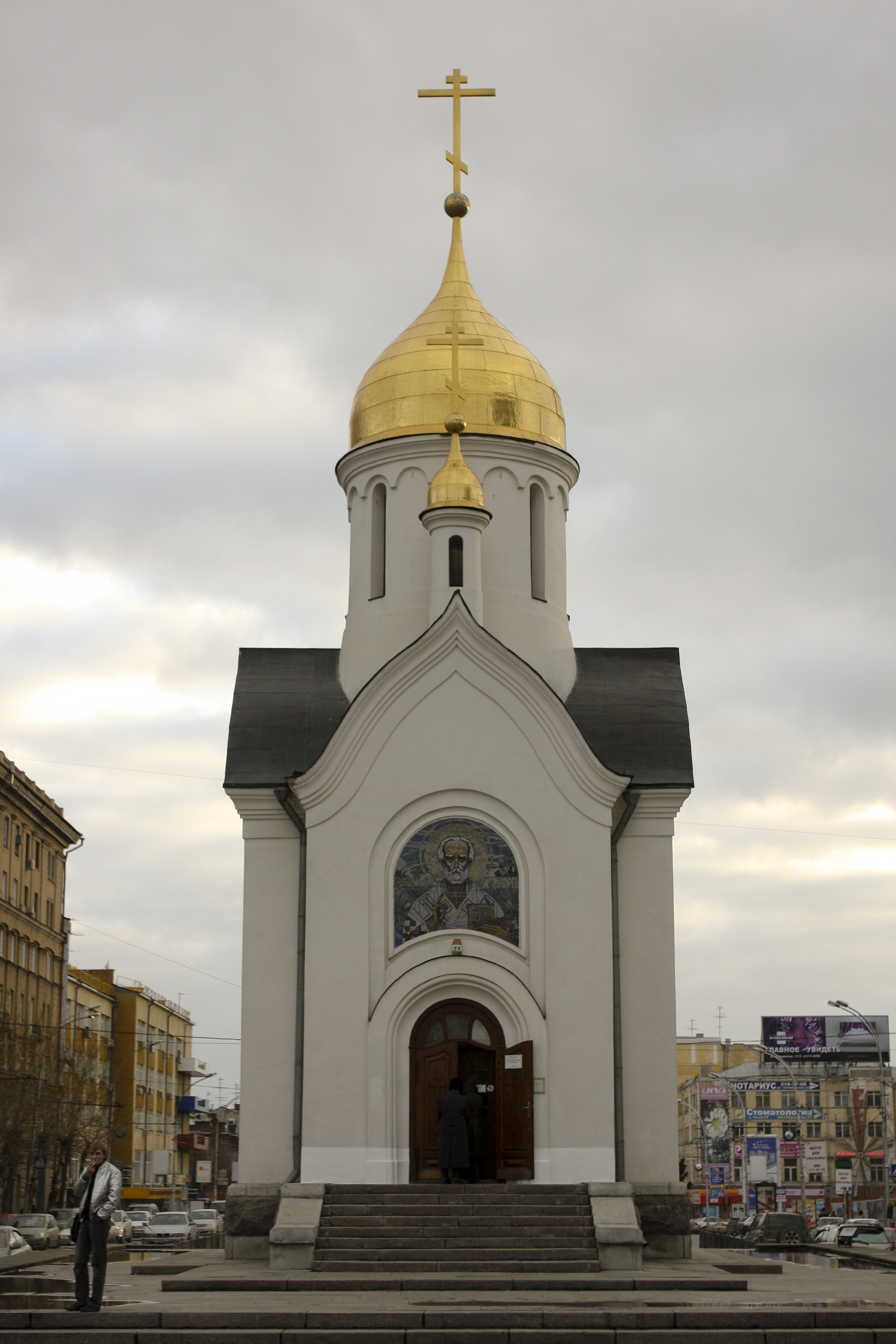

Religion
- Affiliation: Russian Orthodox

Location
- Location: Novosibirsk
- Interactive map of Saint Nicholas Chapel; Часовня Святого Николая

Architecture
- Architects: Andrey Kryachkov (original); P. A. Chernobrovtsev (1993 version)

Saint Nicholas Chapel (Russian: Часовня Святого Николая) is a Russian Orthodox chapel in Tsentralny City District of Novosibirsk, Russia.

== History ==
Saint Nicholas Chapel was built in 1914–1915 by the architect Andrey Kryachkov.

In 1930, the church was demolished by the Soviet regime.

The chapel was restored in 1993 by the architect Pyotr Chernobrovtsev.

== Gallery ==
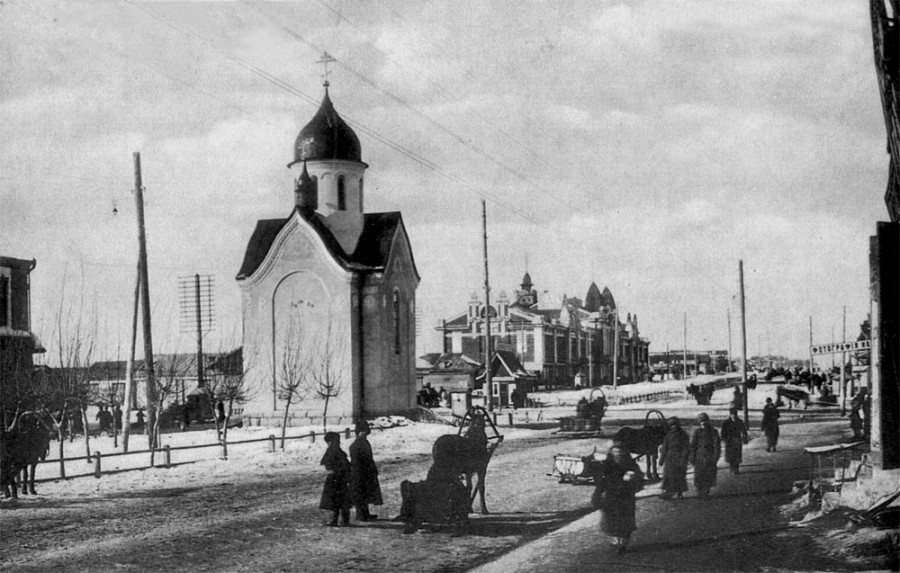
Original chapel
