= House of Architect A. D. Kryachkov =

Preserved house in Tomsk, Russia

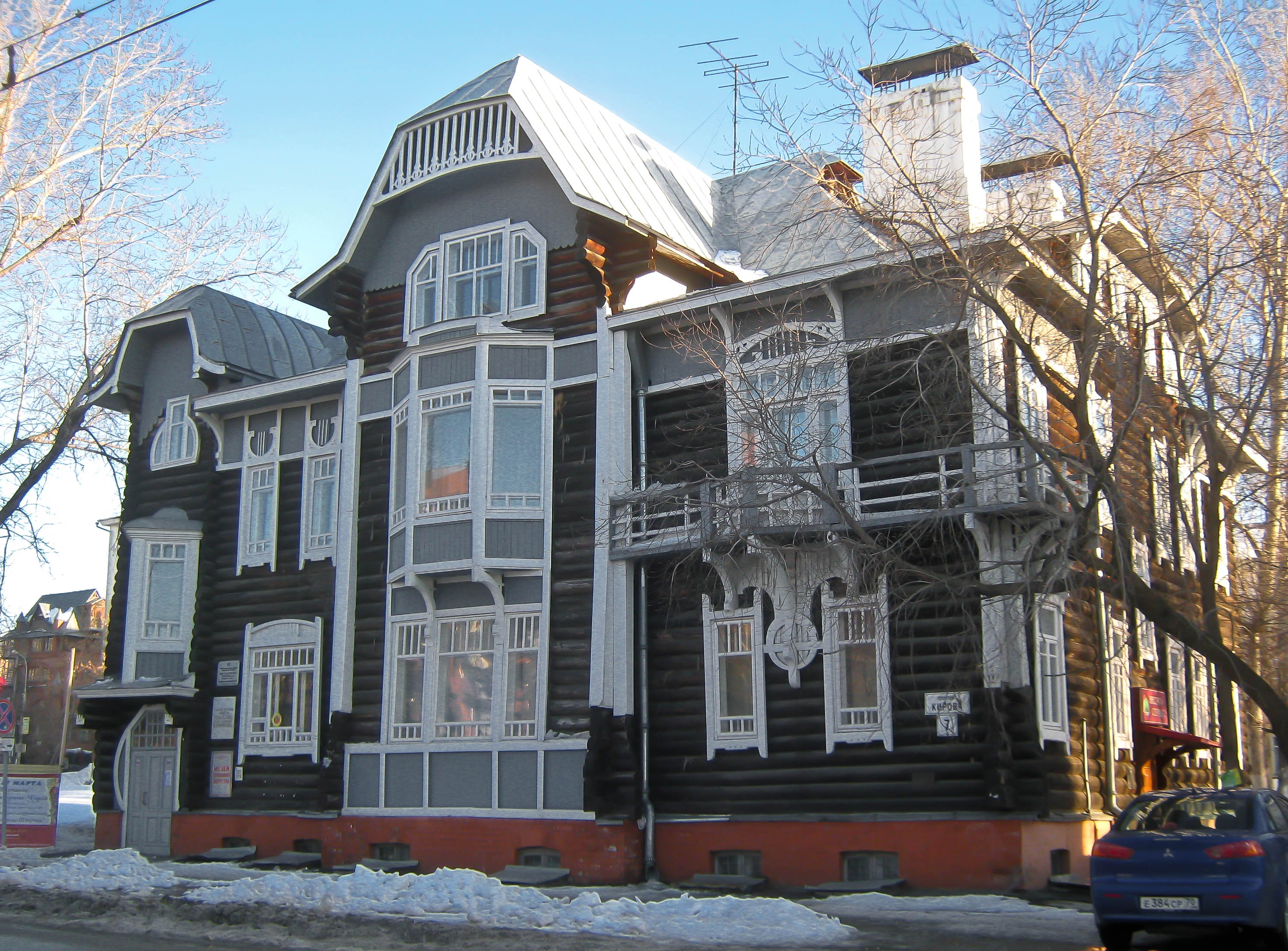
- Interactive map of the House of Architect A. D. Kryachkov area

General information
- Architectural style: Rational Art Nouveau
- Location: Kirov Avenue, 7, Tomsk, Russia
- Coordinates: 56.4662°N 84.9563°E
- Construction started: 1910
- Completed: 1911

Technical details
- Material: Wood and brick

Design and construction
- Architect: Andrey Kryachkov
- Designations: Cultural Heritage of the Peoples of the Russian Federation

The House of Architect A. D. Kryachkov (Russian: Дом архитектора А. Д. Крячкова) is a monument of urban planning and architecture of federal significance in Tomsk, Siberia, Russia. The wooden mansion in the Art Nouveau style was built in 1910–1911 to a design by the Siberian architect Andrey Kryachkov. The building is located in the historic centre of Tomsk, along the red line of Kirov Avenue, with a courtyard garden, and forms part of the historic streetscape of one of the city's main thoroughfares.

Kryachkov initially designed the mansion in the Neo-Russian style, but in the final version preferred the rationalist tendency of Art Nouveau, which was popular at the time. According to this rationalist aesthetic, the house received restrained, austere, and geometrically conceived decorative treatment of both its exteriors and interiors.

The architect conceived the construction of the mansion as an experimental project, intending to demonstrate that wood as a building material was modern, economically justified, and aesthetically appealing. The house became the first residential wooden building in Siberia with the most advanced engineering and utilities of the time: hot-water heating, running water, sewerage, and ventilation.

The mansion remained in the Kryachkov family until 1959, when it was donated to the Tomsk Polytechnic Institute. The building is associated with a number of prominent Tomsk residents: architects Konstantin Lygin and Vikenty Orzheshko; and academics and scholars Vladimir Obruchev, Nikolai Chizhevsky, Vladimir Kuznetsov, Mikhail Usov, Nikolai Gornostaev, Nikolai Gutovsky, and Alexander Koshurnikov.

Today the house is home to a branch of the Tomsk Regional Art Museum — the Museum of Wooden Architecture named after A. D. Kryachkov. The building is the only former wooden residential mansion in Russia that houses an architecture museum.

== Design and construction ==
Andrey Kryachkov was born in 1876 in the family of a Yaroslavl peasant, Dmitry Iosifovich Kryachkov. In 1888, he completed a three-year school and left to do seasonal work at a tobacco factory in Vyborg. Having demonstrated abilities in drawing and languages at evening courses, Kryachkov was able to enter a real school in 1890, graduated in 1896, and the following year enrolled at the St. Petersburg Institute of Civil Engineers. In 1902, due to the institute's recommendation, he moved to Tomsk, where he began working as a junior engineer in the construction department of the Tomsk Provincial Administration and as a full-time lecturer at the Technological Institute in architectural design and drawing. Participating in the construction of buildings at Tomsk University and the Technological Institute, the architect underwent rigorous engineering and construction training. In his early years he served as an assistant to Fortunat Gut, and later himself headed the construction of the entire complex of buildings.

In the rapidly developing cities of Western Siberia at the beginning of the 20th century, the small number of architects and engineers had considerable opportunities to realise their talents. By the early 1910s Kryachkov had already become a well-known and sought-after architect, designing projects not only for Tomsk but also for Kuznetsk, Kainsk, Omsk, Novonikolayevsk, Barnaul, and Berdsk.

Kryachkov, as an architect and engineer, was interested in the use of wood in construction. He believed that Siberia's vast timber reserves were not used to its full potential, and that architects and builders should direct their efforts towards designing new, rational types of wooden buildings. He decided to build the mansion for his own family in Tomsk as an experimental project, intending to demonstrate that three-storey wooden residential buildings equipped with central heating (which was forbidden at the time for all wooden structures) were justifiable both functionally and economically. The central idea of the mansion's architecture was that it should be the first wooden house in Tomsk with an autonomous utility system (steam heating), proving that wood was a modern building material and that a house built from it could be combined with all the scientific and technological achievements in the domestic sphere of the early 20th century.

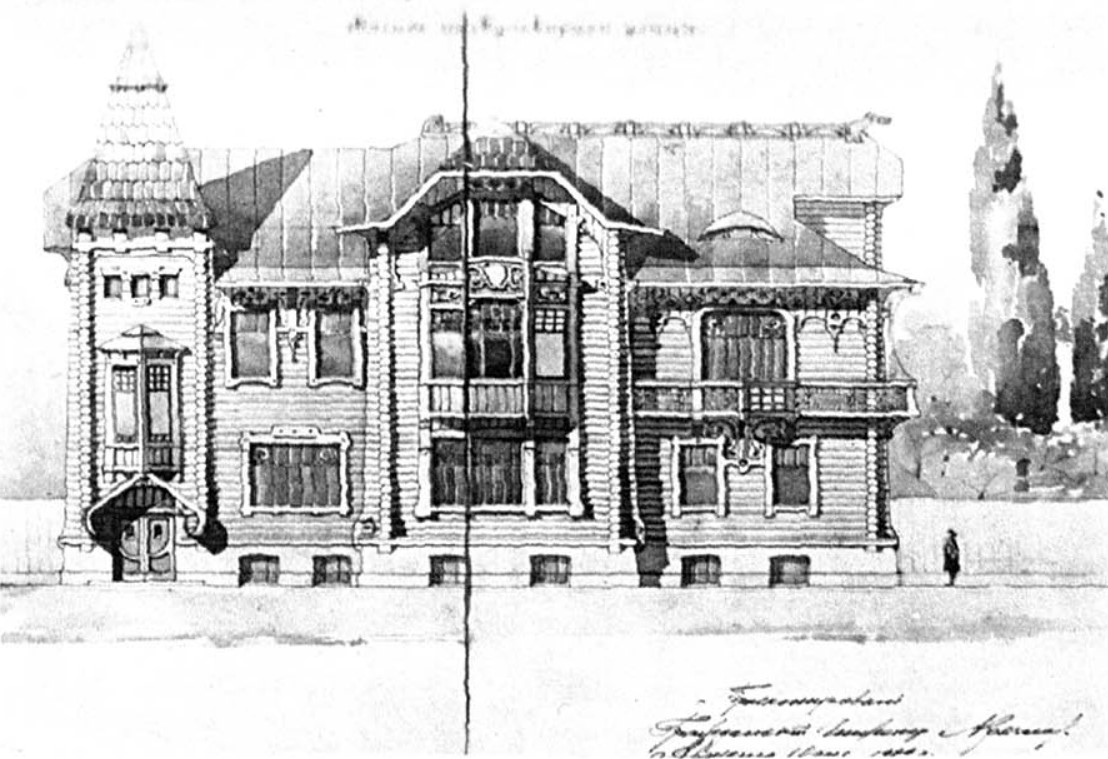
First design of the mansion in the Neo-Russian style, 1909

The architect completed the design of the mansion by 10 August 1909. It was already approved with signatures at the city council on 7 September. The allocation of the building plot was approved by architect Tovy Fishel. The papers were then sent for approval to Saint Petersburg, where the project was rejected on the grounds that the proposed building was effectively three storeys (two floors plus a semi-basement and a residential mezzanine were counted as three), while fire safety regulations of the time allowed no more than two. A long process of discussion and revision of the project ensued. The Technical Construction Committee in St. Petersburg ultimately approved it on the basis that a hot-water heating boiler room was to be installed, above which fireproof brick vaults on seven iron beams were to be placed. The committee also required the mandatory installation of cast-iron stoves in the kitchens. Thus, the mansion had already become known as a unique phenomenon in the Siberian architecture of its time even at the design stage.

Construction of the building lasted for two years, from 1910 to 1911. The mansion became the first fully appointed wooden house in Siberia, with a steam boiler room in the basement and bathrooms and toilets on both floors. The appearance of the completed building differed from the design: the pyramidal roof section that had overhanged the main entrance was removed, and the decorative treatment of the facades was altered. The architect himself later described the house as follows:

This house represents an economical to build and operate house, compact in plan and volume while making full use of the semi-basement and attic space. Central heating was applied in a wooden house in Siberia for the first time. Its details aresimple; the cornice with its large overhang, necessary under Siberian conditions, is its main ornament.

== 1910s–1970s: the mansion as a residential house ==
Marcel Garipov (the author of the historical register about the house) suggested that the mansion was occupied almost immediately after the completion of construction work, as evidenced by the interior finishing — cladding in wood and decorative fabric. Wooden houses at the time were usually plastered only after settlement, which sometimes took a considerable period of time. The architect's family occupied the entire first floor of the house: it contained a dining room, a drawing room, children's rooms, a kitchen, a study, a draughting room, a bedroom, and a bathroom with a toilet. The remaining rooms of the mansion were let out.

Kryachkov's study housed the library of the Society of Siberian Engineers; Saturday meetings of the Society were also held there, attended by Tomsk architects and other prominent scholars and public figures. The Kryachkov house was visited by architects Konstantin Lygin and Vikenty Orzheshko, and by academics Vladimir Obruchev, Nikolai Chizhevsky, Vladimir Kuznetsov, and Mikhail Usov.

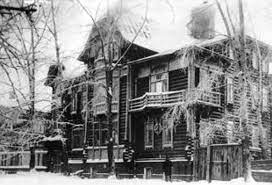
The Kryachkov House. Photograph from the 1920s

After the 1917 Revolution, the house remained in Kryachkov's ownership, which was unusual for the time. In the late 1920s and early 1930s, the architect began considering the possibility of moving from Tomsk to another city. The Novosibirsk publication Gorodskoy chislennik wrote: "...these years Kryachkov is being 'squeezed out' of the bureaucratic and arrogant Tomsk, was actively looking at other Siberian cities in search of work". In the end, the Kryachkov family moved to Novosibirsk in 1930, and the house was rented out to the Polytechnic Institute.

In different times, prominent Siberian scholars and their families lived in the mansion — Mikhail Urusov (in the mansard storey), Nikolai Gornostaev, Nikolai Gutovsky, Alexander Koshurnikov, and others. After Kryachkov's death, his widow donated the mansion to the Polytechnic Institute in March 1959.

The house was placed under state protection as an architectural monument of local significance in 1978. By the time preparatory work on the first restoration of the mansion began in 1979, the house had been divided into apartments and was home to twelve families.

== 1980s: fire and restoration ==
In the 1980s, the house passed under the management of the research institute Giprotyumenneftegaz. In 1980, the institution commissioned a restoration and adaptation design for the building as an institute branch from the design department of the specialist scientific restoration studio Tomskrestauratsiya. The project was the studio's first. The project's author, architect Larisa Romanova, received specialist training in March 1979 at advanced courses at the Rosrestavratsiya association. The authoring team also included postgraduate student M. M. Garipov (compilation of the historical note), engineer T. I. Dregvaleva (schematic drawings), architectural technician L. N. Pavlova (preparation of project documentation), and quantity surveyor E. S. Gustova (preparation of cost estimates).

The presence of residents in the house complicated the monument's survey, so the measured drawings of 1977, made by students of the architectural faculty of the Tomsk Engineering and Construction Institute, were used as the basis. Analysis of archival documents and visual inspection revealed that the landscape composition of the estate had not survived: many plantings and the historic fence had been lost. The wooden outbuildings, built to Kryachkov's design from plank boards in the Art Nouveau style, had suffered losses. Overall, losses to the original appearance of the house amounted to no more than 30%, including the balcony and terrace on the south facade, the railing and floor of the balcony on the north and west facades, individual decorative details, and the original drainpipes with funnels, all of which had disappeared by that time. The original interiors were entirely lost. The adaptation plan envisaged accommodating the administrative apparatus and design departments on the two floors and the mansard, and a documentation and technical bureau in the semi-basement. The project's author took into account and partially preserved the changes to the layout that had arisen from the residence of Tomsk Polytechnic Institute staff families in the mansion.

The sketch restoration design envisaged restoring the original appearance of the house on the basis of surviving similar elements, their traces, and photographs. The colour scheme was built on the palette characteristic of Art Nouveau. The choice of tones was based on a photograph taken by Kryachkov shortly after the mansion was built (the photograph was later lost). During the preparation of the project, Marcel Garipov, who had compiled the historical note on the house, noted the necessity of adapting the part of the mansion where Andrey Kryachkov had lived to a residential function and setting aside a room for a museum exhibition devoted to the architect's work. Bearing in mind that the placement of the institute in the mansion was intended to be temporary, Romanova later proposed locating the House of the Architect in the building and a studio club "Zodchestvo" in the basement storey.

Restoration work began in March 1981, after the building had been vacated. In July of the same year, the Siberian branch of the Moscow design institute Spetsproektrestavratsiya was established on the basis of the Tomskrestauratsiya department. The restoration work was delayed because the workers and designers had moved to different organisations. In 1982, the estate fence and coach house were demolished. The mansion stood unguarded for a long time. In the night of 31 August to 1 September, a fire broke out in the house, destroying the roof truss system, part of the mezzanine, the attic floors, and the stairwell of the first floor, while the north facade and mezzanine were severely scorched.

Since Larisa Romanova had been transferred as chief project architect to the 2nd Architectural Restoration Studio, Yuri Bardychev was appointed lead architect for the restoration of the Kryachkov house, with engineer Sergei Shatov carrying out the engineering work. Photographs taken during the survey stage helped to recreate the mansion with great accuracy, including in particular the lost oriel above the main entrance, the doors, and the complex roof silhouette. The only difference was the roofing material, which at the client's insistence was made from galvanised metal. Restoration work continued until 1989, when Romanova supervised the painting of the facades.

== 1994–present: Museum of Wooden Architecture ==
The creation of a museum of wooden architecture in Tomsk was prompted by the problem of preserving the city's cultural heritage and its wooden architecture. The need for such a museum became apparent when the public and staff of the Tomsk Regional Art Museum faced the irreversible loss of wooden houses and their carved ornamentation. The museum traces its history to 1994, when a department for collecting and studying wooden decorative elements and recording wooden buildings photographically was established in the mansard room of the Kryachkov mansion. In 1995, at a meeting of the restoration and art council attached to the culture and tourism committee of the Tomsk Oblast administration, it was decided to create a group charged with developing the concept of a museum under the working title Museum of the History and Urban Development of Tomsk. By the end of the year the committee had received the status of a branch of the regional museum and the name Museum of Wooden Architecture.

The museum was opened on 25 November 1996, with an exhibition dedicated to the 120th anniversary of Andrey Kryachkov's birth. On 3 September 1997 an exhibition devoted to the wooden architecture of Tomsk opened. The exhibition featured elements of decorative work from houses of various historical periods, from the Russian Baroque to Art Nouveau. In 1998 an exhibition entitled "Russian Peasant Room" opened and a collection of iron castings from the late 19th and early 20th centuries was displayed, belonging to artist Gennady Burtsev and later donated to the museum. In September 2002, a hall was opened featuring a model of the 17th-century Tomsk fortress recreated by restorer Vladimir Kokovikhin and watercolours by the Tomsk historian and local historian Vitold Slavnin. Throughout the museum's existence, temporary exhibitions of artists, architects, students, and folk craft masters have been held periodically, and collections from private collections have been displayed.

Between 2003 and 2008, repair and restoration work was carried out, including the replacement of rotted log courses and floor beams, as well as the restoration of the main staircase, porch, windows, doors, floors, balcony, and interiors.

== Architecture ==
=== Style ===
Stylistically, the Kryachkov house is attributed to the rationalist tendency of Russian Art Nouveau. The first building constructed in the style of rationalist (austere, rational) Art Nouveau was the exhibition pavilion "The Extreme North," built to a design by the artist Konstantin Korovin for the All-Russia Exhibition 1896, held in Nizhny Novgorod in 1896. Rationalist Art Nouveau emerged as a coherent tendency by the late 1900s. In its buildings, the primary form-giving factor was construction in its technological, rational variant, with repeating elements of the same type. This tendency of Art Nouveau grew out of the experience of designing framed buildings and was prevalent chiefly among Moscow architects. A characteristic example of developed rational Art Nouveau is the Utro Rossii printing house (1907, architect Fyodor Shekhtel).

Rationalist traits in wooden architecture were expressed in the simplification of layouts, the rejection of excessive decorative ornamentation on facades, and the simplification or minimal use of ornament in the decoration of window surrounds. In Tomsk, rational Art Nouveau developed considerably in the early 20th century, and revenue houses of this type were built in all parts of the city. In the original design for his own house, Kryachkov initially employed motifs from the Neo-Russian style, but in the final version he abandoned "Russian" stylisations and moved to a purely geometric rendering of decorative elements that emphasised the austere structural composition of the building. The architect studied the latest trends in Art Nouveau during a trip to Rome in 1907, applying them in the design of his own house, so that the mansion stood out against the general streetscape of the city with its unusual appearance.

=== Volumetric and spatial composition ===
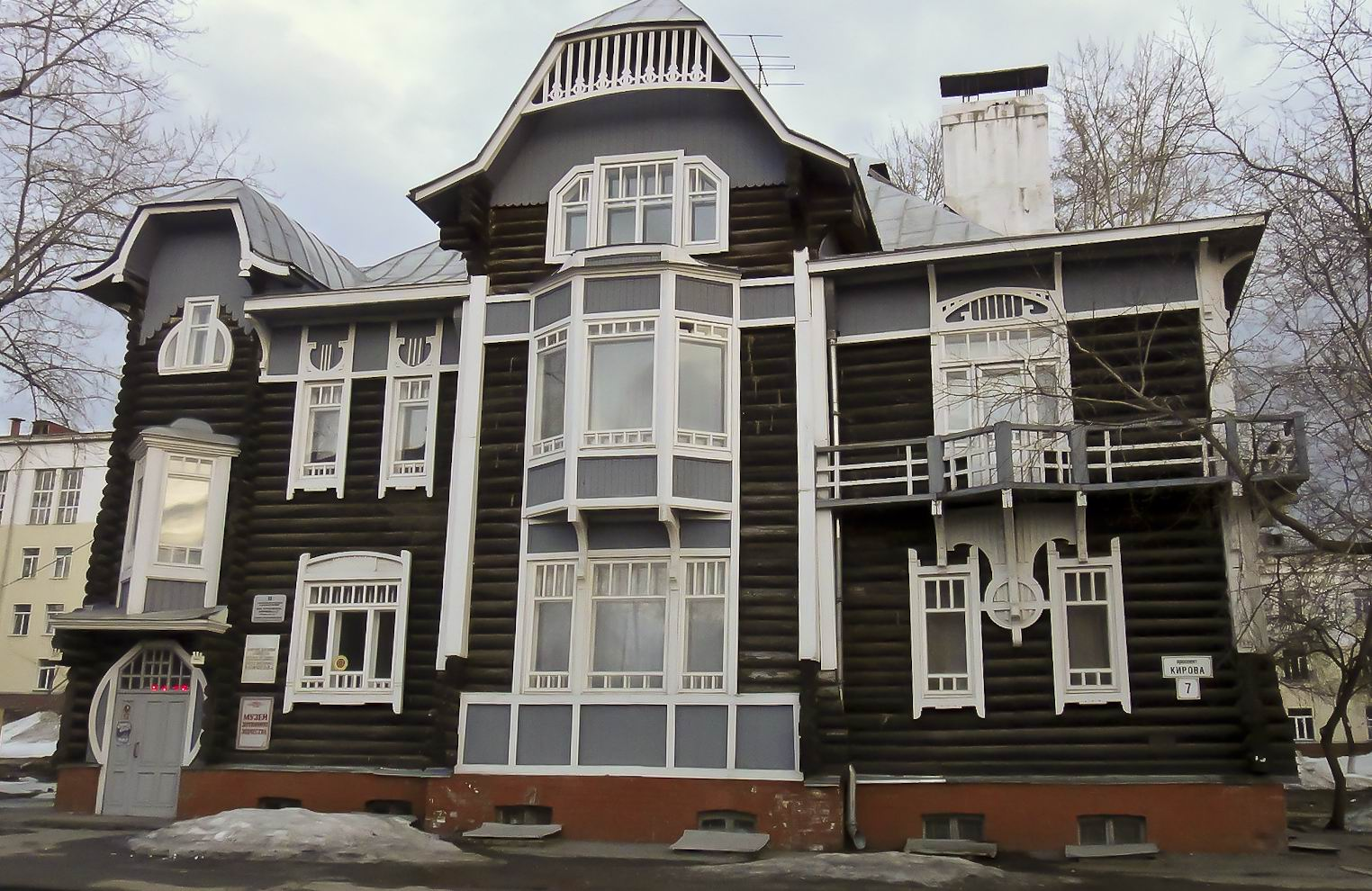
The main north facade

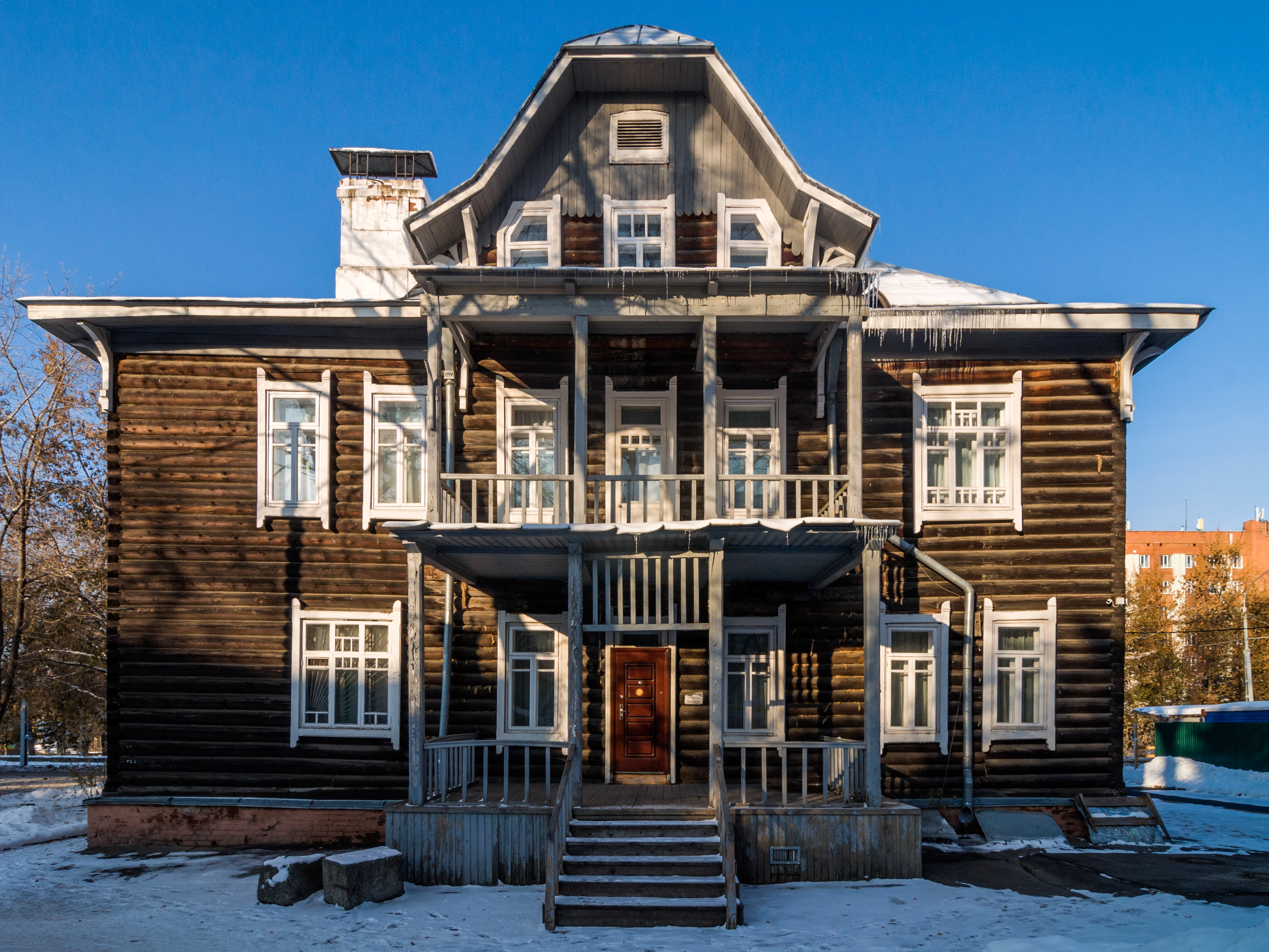
The courtyard south facade

In the design of the house, Kryachkov followed both the principles of Art Nouveau and the theoretical compositional principles of the Russian style. In developing the volumetric and spatial composition, the architect drew on the so-called "law of grouping" of the late-19th-century theorist of the Russian style, Vladimir Shervud. According to this "law," the individual parts of the plan (close to square in shape) were brought together into a unified system and distinguished within the overall mass of the building. Kryachkov thus followed the compositional principle known as "from the inside outwards" or "the exterior answers the interior content".

The house's basis volumetric and spatial composition is an undivided two-storey volume with a basement and a mezzanine. In plan it is of almost regular rectangular form, broken only by the projections of oriels, balconies, and a fore-bodies. Kryachkov's striving for plastic expressiveness was realised in the articulation of the building's volumes and the spatial picturesqueness of its silhouette: the facade was enriched with oriels, the projection of the stairwell in the form of a tower, balconies of various forms, the tympanum of the pediment with the mansard window inscribed within it, and hipped eaves of the gable roofs. The composition of the main facade was marked by asymmetry, balanced by the dominance of the central risalit. The projecting elements in plan were treated as independent volumes, emphasised by complex-shaped pediments and canopies.

In the volumetric and planning solution of the mansion, the architect realised his theoretical concepts regarding the need to adapt historically established rational building types to the latest technical conditions. He later wrote on this subject in his doctoral dissertation:

Both in the indigenous architecture of the Siberians and in that of the Russian settlers, one observes historically developed rational types of buildings, their constructions and forms, suited to the harsh climate of the country and its natural conditions. It would be unwise for modern builders to disregard this great experience. It must be studied and, on the basis of new progressive technology, critically assimilated. (Andrei Kryachkov, The Influence of Climate and Nature on Construction and Architecture in Siberia. Doctoral dissertation, 1949)

Kryachkov's striving for compactness in the volumetric and spatial solution was expressed not only in the plan but also in a further dimension — height, which is of particular importance for relatively small buildings in which the optimal relationship between plan and height presents a complex challenge for the architect. From the standpoint of the rational use of space, the mansion was one of Kryachkov's finest works: it effectively had three and a half storeys, although the architect himself wrote on the plan — "the mezzanine is not counted in the number of storeys". With the compact plan and volume, the semi-basement and the attic in the manner of a mezzanine were fully utilised. The architectural historian Sergei Balandin considered that in its overall resolution of the architectural problem, Kryachkov's own house bore a resemblance to the celebrated work of Viktor Simov and Leonid Vesnin — the dacha of V. A. Nosenkov in Ivankovo near Moscow (1908–1909).

=== Building materials and construction ===
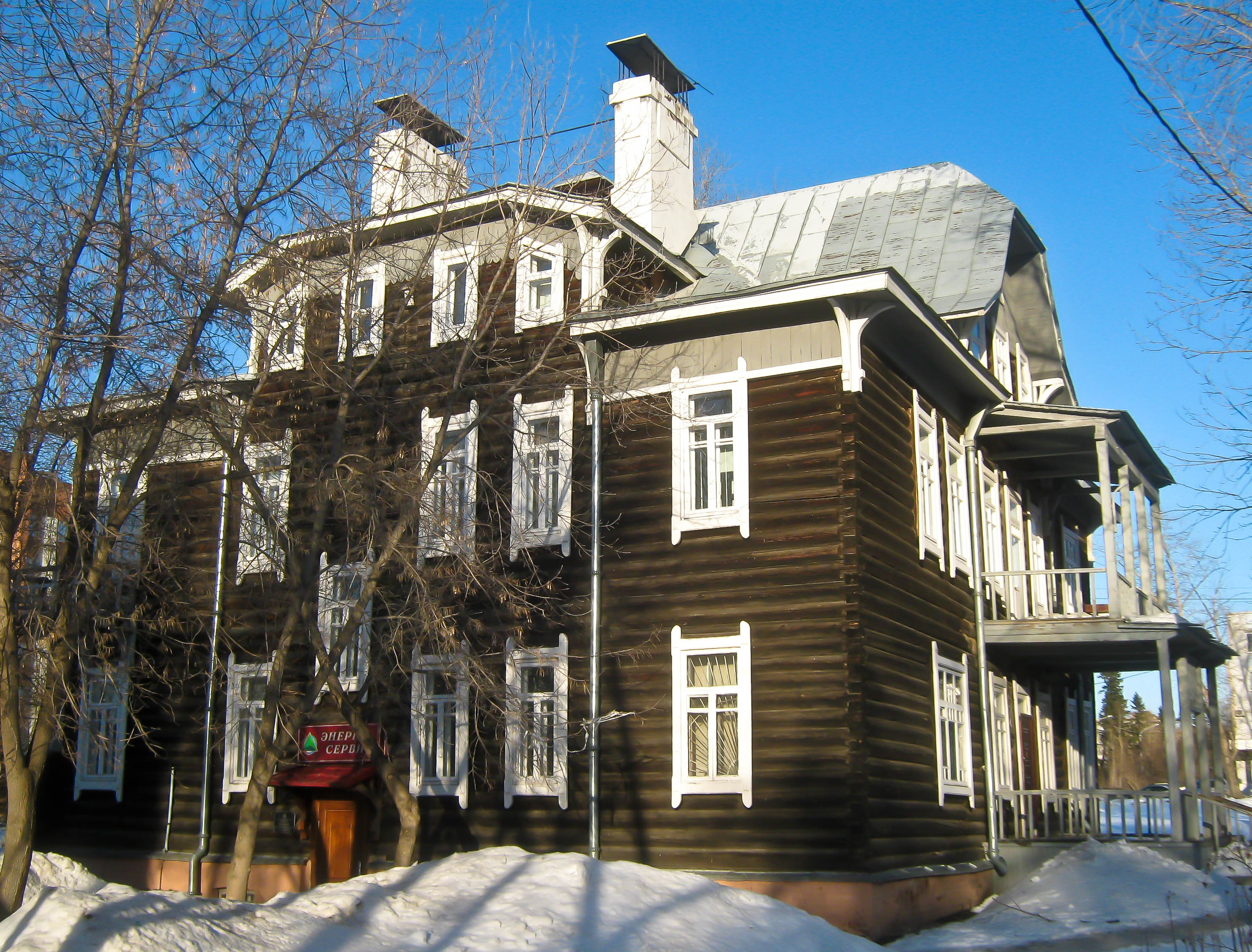
West facade of the house

The main wooden volume of the building, measuring 19 × 16 m, rests on a tall brick plinth. In choosing the construction material, Kryachkov was guided by his conviction that Siberia's vast timber reserves were underused and that wood still had a great role to play in local construction. Regarding wood as an ecologically clean, aesthetically appealing, economical, and accessible material, he chose it for the construction of the main volume of the mansion. The walls of the house were built from pine — the species least susceptible to rot. The basement storey was built from brick and partly from larch, which does not decay in a damp environment but, on the contrary, becomes stronger.

The main volume takes the form of a log structure. The jointing technique on the main facade is the "oblo" method (notch-and-saddle), with the log courses reduced in size as the building rises. The "oblo" jointing method is one of the oldest building techniques in wooden architecture, reliable from a structural point of view and providing more effective heat retention in the building. The gradual increase towards the base of the log projections at the corners gave the building the effect of plastic expressiveness and monumental statics. At the corners of the courtyard facades the logs were joined using the "v lapu" (dovetail) method.

The roof is of overall four-pitched construction, complicated by the projecting volumes of the oriels and risalit, which house the mansard-storey rooms. An important structural element of the roof was the cornice with a generous overhang, necessary in the Siberian climate. In his subsequent architectural practice, Kryachkov developed the problem of structural durability in the specific Siberian climate, related to moisture and temperature fluctuations. He noted that the plastic solution plays a most important role in the preservation of buildings under Siberian conditions: the upper parts of walls must be well protected from atmospheric precipitation by cornices with a large overhang.

The mansion was equipped with the most advanced engineering and utilities of the time: hot-water heating, running water, sewerage, and exhaust ventilation. Kryachkov paid particular attention to the effect of moisture on wooden structures from within, and so the wooden floors in his buildings were always accompanied by a special ventilation system of channels leading outside through pipes. This ensured ventilation that prevented condensation forming and kept the beams in good condition.

It is noteworthy that the search for new volumetric, planning, and decorative solutions in the wooden architecture of early-20th-century Tomsk took place precisely within the system of private residential construction. Through experimental buildings, architects sought to dispel the established myths about wooden houses and to demonstrate all the possibilities of wood as a building material. Through the architectural and engineering aspects of the mansion, Kryachkov demonstrated that the possibilities of wood had been underestimated. Nevertheless, this type of residential house subsequently failed to gain wider use due to resistance from the Tomsk administration. Only in 1916–1917 did Kryachkov return to the subject, designing a group of similar wooden houses for the garden city of the Kolchugino Railway, but the realisation of the project was prevented by World War I. The Kryachkov mansion and the house of Vikenty Orzheshko, similar in its architectural aims, remained examples to be emulated by architects in Omsk, Tomsk, and Novosibirsk.

=== Decoration ===
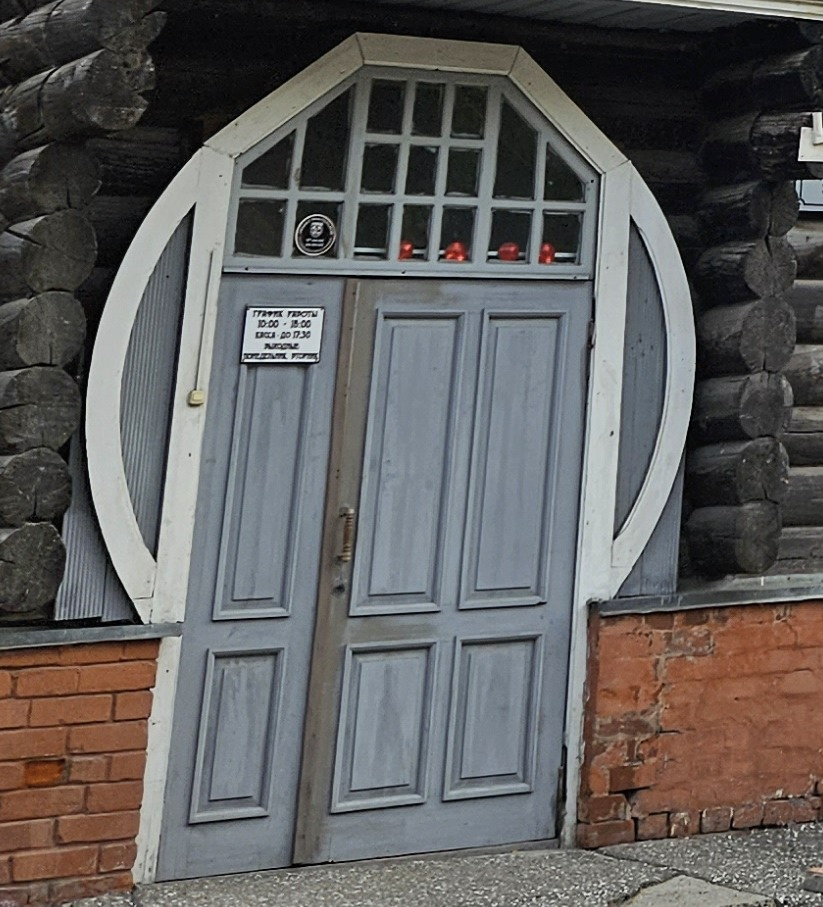
The main entrance door with its surround

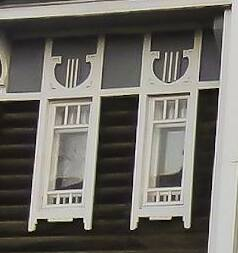
Paired windows with window surround tops in the form of a lyre

In the design of the house, the architect initially employed Russian motifs, stylising them in the Art Nouveau manner: the tent of the stairwell was covered with shingles, the canopy over the entrance was designed in the form of a "barrel," a carved wooden frieze was placed below the cornice, and the ridge of the gable roof was completed with a stylised "dragon." The final version of the decoration was executed in strictly geometric rendering, characteristic of rational Art Nouveau. Like many Russian architects of the period when Art Nouveau held sway, Kryachkov largely abandoned stylised elements in the decoration, employing minimal ornament concentrated around window and door openings and in the roof frieze. The strictly geometricised ornament of the decorative treatment played on the motifs of the circle and the square, flowing into distinctive large-scale arches.

The principle of asymmetry, generally characteristic of Art Nouveau, predominates in the decorative treatment. The main expanses of the log walls are not clad with boards on the outside; they are pierced by windows of varying form and width. The windows are decorated with the flat window surrounds characteristic of Art Nouveau, which are distinguished by unusual ornamentation — the upper part of each surround resembles a lyre in form. The window openings were designed on a large scale; sometimes they were arranged in pairs or threes and united by vertical decorative elements, giving the horizontally elongated facades a visual effect of upward aspiration. The asymmetry of the main facade was balanced by the diagonal placement of two small windows and by the central risalit — the largest and most richly decorated element. The corners of the risalit's log structure are covered with boards painted in contrasting white, and in its pediment, at the eaves edge of the roof, an openwork wooden grille is placed.

The upper part of the walls and the pediments are covered with vertical board cladding, which reads as a contrast against the log walls. The cladding is decorated with brackets. Similar brackets support the corner balcony of the second floor, facing north-west. The main entrance door is handled in an original manner: its rectangular volume is set within a circular surround, with a glazed semicircular opening above. The decorative picturesqueness of the facade treatment is built on the use of wood, the varied texture of boards and logs, and the contrast between the glazed and the natural log surfaces. The courtyard facade was treated more austerely, with an even rhythm in the placement of windows.

== Interiors ==
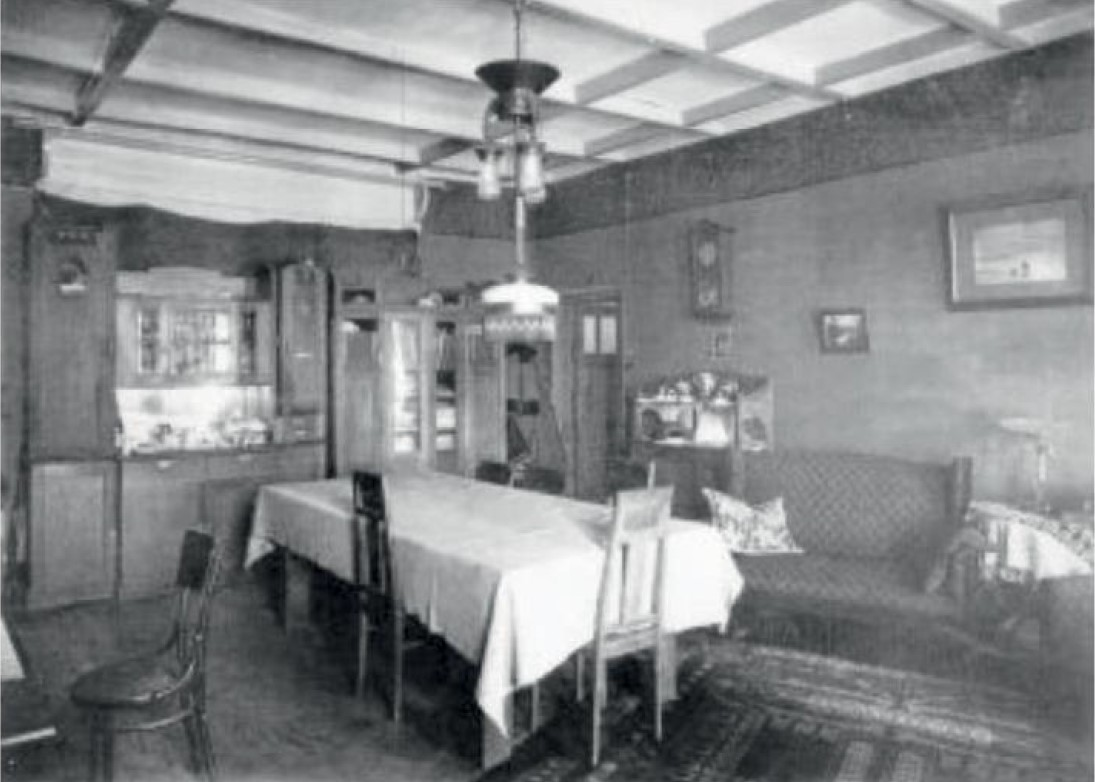
Interior of the drawing room. 1910s

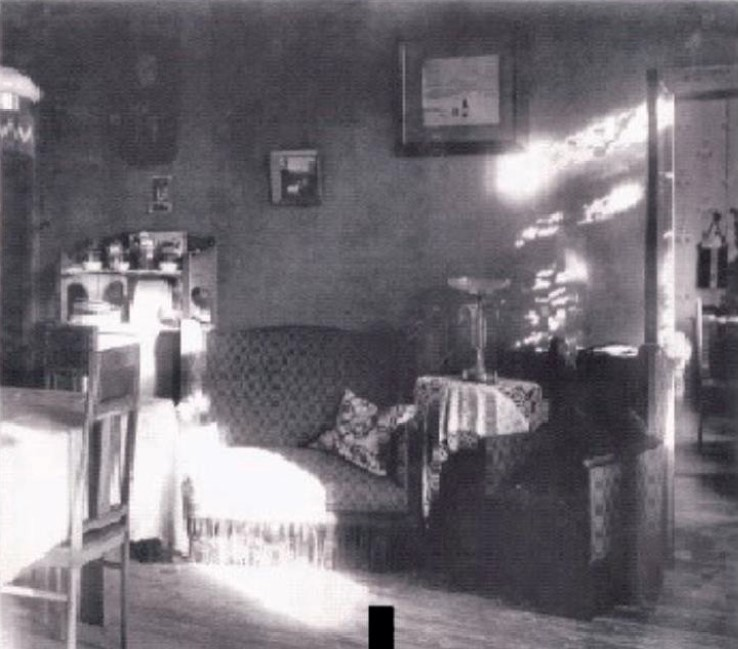
Interior of the drawing room. 1910s

According to the Art Nouveau principles, the interior space organising aspects were resolved on the basis of the functional purpose of each room. The axis of the planning composition was the central part of the building, which on all floors was occupied by two spacious rooms: one looking out onto the courtyard facade, with access to a terrace on the first floor and a balcony on the second; the other looking onto the main facade, distinguished on the facade by the projection of the risalit and a trapezoidal oriel. Rooms of smaller area were grouped around these.

The main entrance to the house for the Kryachkov family, residents, and guests was arranged on the side of the facade facing the street. A well-lit reception room with a large staircase was arranged at the main entrance. A second staircase in the western part of the mansion, with access to the side facade, was intended for domestic staff. It provided access to the kitchen, pantries, utility rooms, the basement, and the mansard. The dining room on the first floor had an exit to the garden. The layout of the first and second floors was arranged so that the owners and the domestic staff had almost no occasion to cross paths.

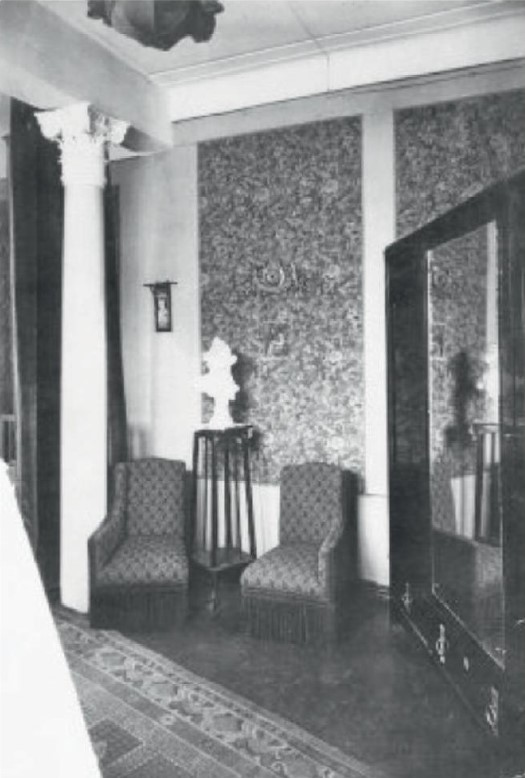
Interior of the bedroom. 1910s

The forms and dimensions of the windows were of great importance in the mansion's interiors. The architect endeavoured, taking into account the specific features of the Siberian climate, to find optimal window dimensions that would create a balance between adequate light and the retention of heat. Large windows contributed both to better insolation and to the effect of visually expanding the interior space, which greatly changed the perception of the interiors. The windows on the courtyard facades not only visually expanded the space but also looked out onto the garden, creating a sense of free flow into the natural environment, thereby fulfilling yet another function of Art Nouveau aesthetics — "from the inside outwards".

According to data from the technical inventory of the early 1930s, the total area of the house was 893 m², including 539 m² of residential space and 334 m² of service space (utility rooms). In the semi-basement there were three living rooms and three kitchens, storage rooms for bicycles, a coal store, and a boiler room. The entire first floor was occupied by the Kryachkov family. The apartment consisted of a dining room, a kitchen, a nursery, the parents' bedroom, a drawing room, a draughting room, and a study. On the second floor there were seven rooms and a shared kitchen; in the attic rooms and mezzanine there were living rooms and a shared kitchen.

The interior of the house's rooms was from the outset marked by austerity, rationality, simplicity, and clear, schematised, geometric stylised forms characteristic of rational Art Nouveau. Kryachkov placed emphasis on the decorative treatment of the walls and the furnishings. All elements of the interior decor — furniture fittings, door handles, display cabinet glazing, room finishes, and furniture design — he executed himself, on the basis of the Art Nouveau principles according to which every detail was to combine functionality and beauty. The architect made virtually no use of decorative ornament; the principal attention was directed to the objects themselves within the interior.

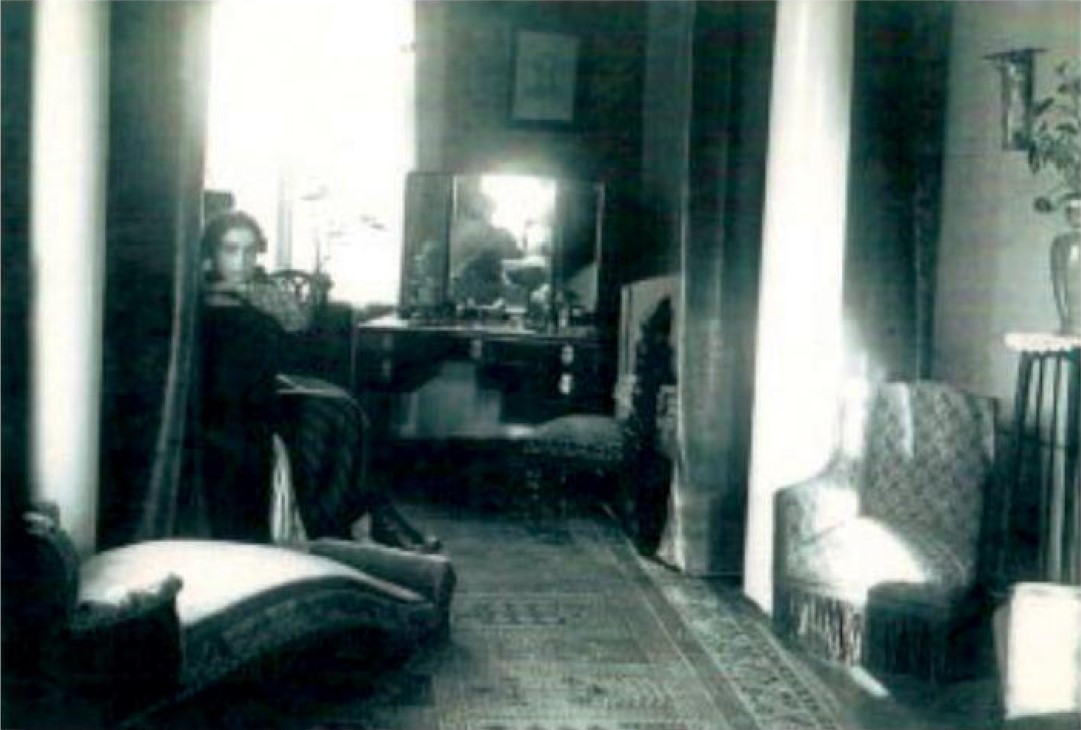
Interior of the bedroom. 1910s

In the interior of the bedroom, a smooth ceiling cornice was employed. The space of the room was divided into functional zones by a ceiling beam supported by columns of the classical Corinthian order, as well as by dark fabric curtains and the symmetrical arrangement of the furniture. A day bed, armchairs, and a wardrobe with a mirror were grouped into distinctive rest corners. The wardrobe was made in austere rationalist forms, while the upholstered furniture, by contrast, was distinguished by curved, undulating contours. The bedroom walls were painted and hung with tapestries bearing floral ornaments. The Art Nouveau chandelier was decorated with a textile lampshade.

In the interior of the drawing room, the architect applied the principle of correspondence between interior space and furnishings. The high beamed ceiling was decorated with cornices and a hanging Art Nouveau lamp. The ornament and colouring of the walls echoed the upholstery of the sofa. The central compositional element of the room was a large table, around which stood chairs, a sofa, a display cabinet, a sideboard, and a piano. The design of the display cabinet and sideboard was executed in the manner of rational Art Nouveau, with clear lines, plant ornaments, and inlaid glazing. The relief of the sideboard doors echoed the pattern of the internal doors. The chairs in the drawing room were decorated with carved floral ornament.

For the study, Kryachkov designed a wooden drawing rack that vaguely resembled a Greek vase in form, and wooden chairs upholstered in leather. The original interiors and the greater part of the furnishings were lost over time. Surviving elements include the original panelled doors with their fittings, the wooden balustrade of the main staircase, ceiling-wall moldings in certain rooms, and the glazed partition between the drawing room and the dining room. The original planning structure of the mansion was restored during the restoration works.

== Bibliography ==
- Balandin, S. N. (1991). "Moving to Siberia. The Work of A. D. Kryachkov in Tomsk". A. D. Kryachkov. Siberian Architect: A Documentary Essay [А. Д. Крячков. Сибирский архитектор: Докум. очерк]. Zemlyaki. Novosibirsk: West Siberian Book Publishing House.
- Balandin, S. N.; Vaganova, O. P. (1973). Siberian Architect A. D. Kryachkov: Life and Work [Сибирский архитектор А. Д. Крячков: жизнь и творчество]. Novosibirsk: West Siberian Book Publishing House.
- Biryukova, T. V. (2018). "The Interior of the Mansion of Civil Engineer A. D. Kryachkov in the City of Tomsk: On the Problem of Art Nouveau Architecture in Siberia" [Интерьер дома-особняка гражданского инженера А. Д. Крячкова в городе Томске. К проблеме архитектуры модерна в Сибири]. Balandin Readings (1): 545–551.
- Vesnina, T. L. (2011). "The Kryachkov House in the Mirror of the Regional Press" [Дом Крячкова в зеркале региональной прессы]. The Historical Environment and Problems of Tomsk Wooden Architecture: 100 Years of the House of A. D. Kryachkov: Collection of Articles of a Regional Public Conference, November 20, 2010 [Историческая среда и проблемы Томского деревянного зодчества: 100 лет дому А. Д. Крячкова: сборник статей региональной общественной конференции, 20 ноября 2010 г]. Tomsk: Tomsk Polytechnic University Press: 35–41.
- Gerasimov, A. P. (2015). "From the History of the Creation of the Museum of Wooden Architecture in the City of Tomsk" [Из истории создания музея деревянного зодчества в городе Томске]. Balandin Readings (2): 259–267.
- Gerasimov, A. P. (2017). Evolution of Styles in the Wooden Architecture of Western Siberia: A Monograph [Эволюция стилей в деревянной архитектуре Западной Сибири: монография]. Ed. by T. M. Stepanskaya. Tomsk: Tomsk State University of Architecture and Building Press. ISBN 978-5-93057-770-9.
- "House of Architect A. D. Kryachkov" [Дом архитектора А. Д. Крячкова]. OGUAK "Centre for the Protection of Monuments". Archived from the original on 8 March 2018.
- Emelyanov, E. Yu.; Sitnikova, E. V. (2019). "Art Nouveau in the Wooden Architecture of Tomsk at the Beginning of the 20th Century" [Модерн в деревянной архитектуре г. Томска начала XX в]. Bulletin of TSUAB. 21 (1): 114–125.
- Zalesov, V. G. (2004). Architects of Tomsk (19th – Early 20th Century) [Архитекторы Томска (XIX — начало XX века)]. Tomsk State University of Architecture and Building. Tomsk: Tomsk State University of Architecture and Building Press.
- Kinsht, A. V.; Dukhanov, S. S. (2018). "Ecological Foundations of the Sustainable Architecture of A. D. Kryachkov" [Экологические основы устойчивой архитектуры А. Д. Крячкова]. Bulletin of Tomsk State University of Architecture and Building (1): 47–56.
- Kirichenko, E. I. (2015). "Artists of the Abramtsevo Circle and the Formation of Art Nouveau Architecture in Russia" [Художники Абрамцевского кружка и становление архитектуры модерна в России]. Konstantin Korovin and His Era; Anna Golubkina: Proceedings of Academic Conferences [Константин Коровин и его эпоха; Анна Голубкина: материалы научных конференций]. Moscow: State Tretyakov Gallery: 53–62. ISBN 978-5-89580-079-9.
- Malevich, S. S.; Romanova, L. S. (2016). "Adaptation of Historic Wooden Buildings to the Contemporary Needs of Society" [Приспособление деревянных исторических зданий к современным потребностям общества]. Bulletin of Tomsk State University of Architecture and Building (5 (58)): 36–51.
- Romanova, L. S. (2011). "From the History of the Restoration of the Mansion of Civil Engineer A. D. Kryachkov in Tomsk" [Из истории реставрации особняка гражданского инженера А. Д. Крячкова в г. Томске]. The Historical Environment and Problems of Tomsk Wooden Architecture: 100 Years of the House of A. D. Kryachkov: Collection of Articles of a Regional Public Conference, November 20, 2010 [Историческая среда и проблемы Томского деревянного зодчества: 100 лет дому А. Д. Крячкова: сборник статей региональной общественной конференции, 20 ноября 2010 г]. Tomsk: Tomsk Polytechnic University Press: 53–65.
- Slavina, T. A. (1994). "Chapter 11. Architecture of the Late 19th – Early 20th Century". History of Russian Architecture: Textbook for Universities [История русской архитектуры: Учеб. для вузов] (2nd, revised and expanded ed.). Saint Petersburg: Stroyizdat SPb. pp. 516–561. ISBN 5-274-00728-7.
