= Andrey Kryachkov =

Russian architect (1876–1950)

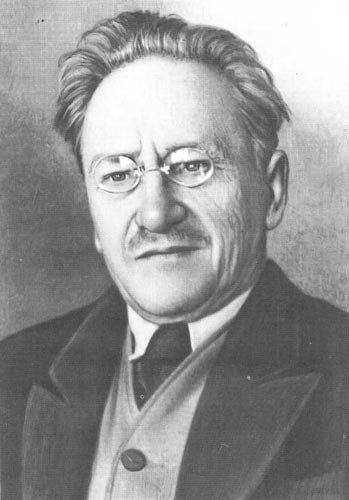
- Born: Andrey Dmitriyevich Kryachkov; 6 December [O.S. 24 November] 1876; Vakhrevo, Rostovsky Uyezd, Yaroslavl Governorate, Russian Empire
- Died: August 25, 1950 (aged 73); Sochi, Krasnodar Krai, RSFSR, Soviet Union
- Education: St. Petersburg institute of civil engineering

Andrey Dmitriyevich Kryachkov (Russian: Андре́й Дми́триевич Крячко́в; 1876–1950) was a Russian and Soviet architect.

== Biography ==
Kryachkov was a graduate of St. Petersburg institute of civil engineering.

He was a leading architect in Novosibirsk in the first half of the 20th century. Kryachkov served as the head of the State Academy of Architecture and Fine Arts (1930–50).

During his life Kryachkov designed buildings in Art Nouveau, constructivist/functionalist and neoclassical styles.

== Awards ==
Recipient of the Order of Saint Stanislaus 2nd class and 3rd class, Order of the Red Banner of Labour, Medal "For Valiant Labour in the Great Patriotic War 1941–1945"

== Gallery ==
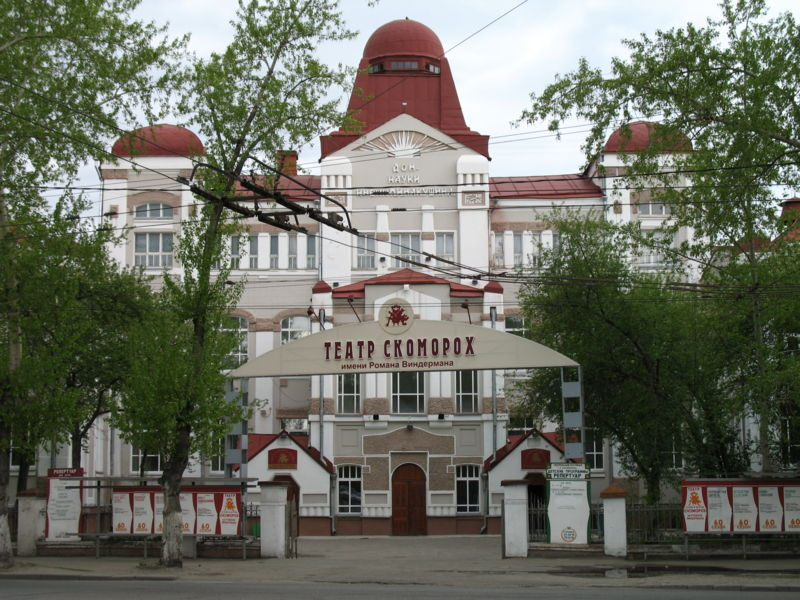
'House of Science'. Tomsk.

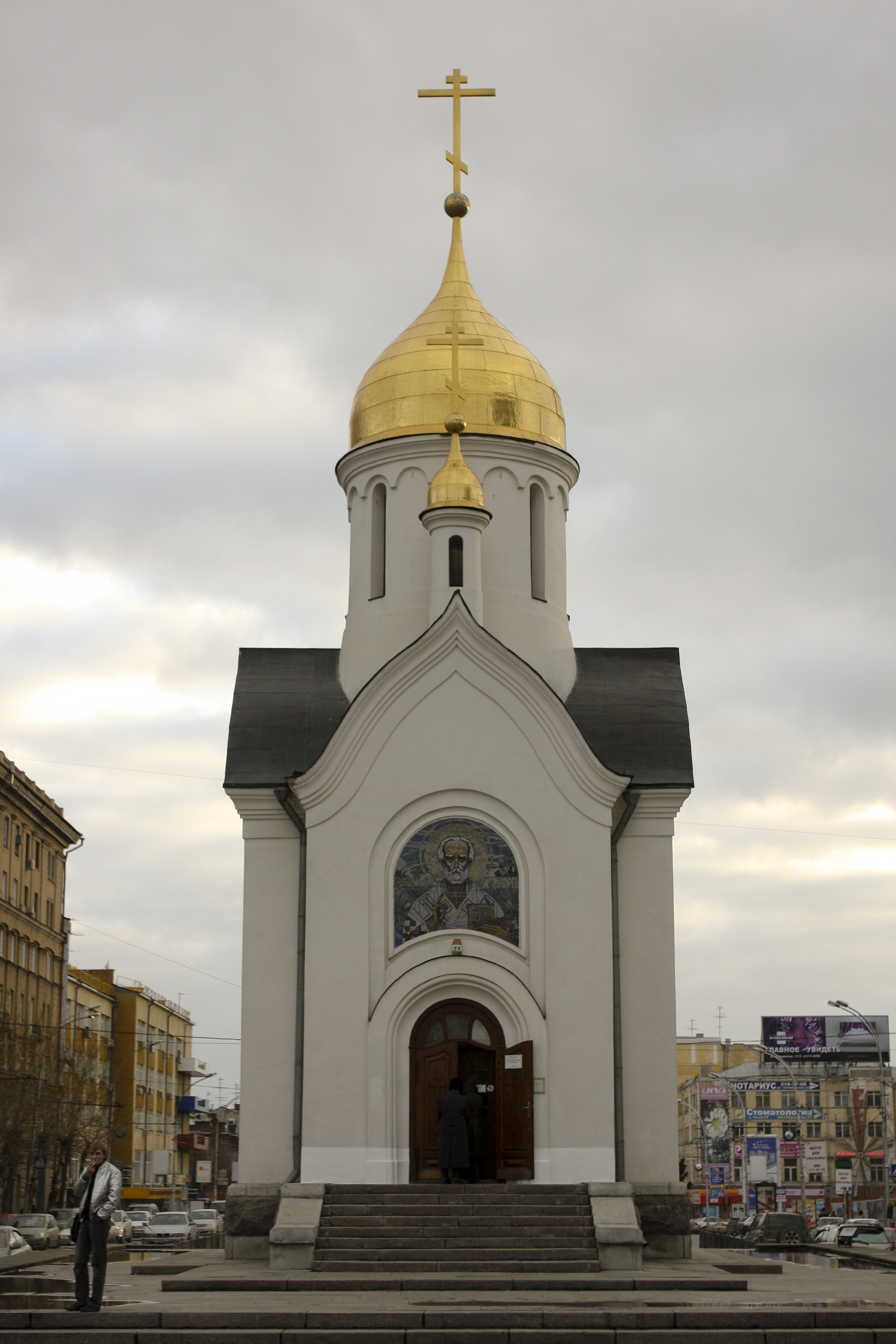
St. Nicholas Chapel. Novosibirsk.

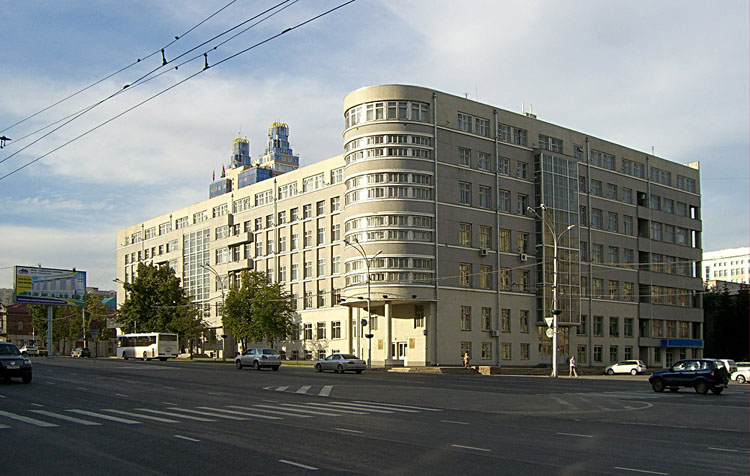
Government building. Novosibirsk.

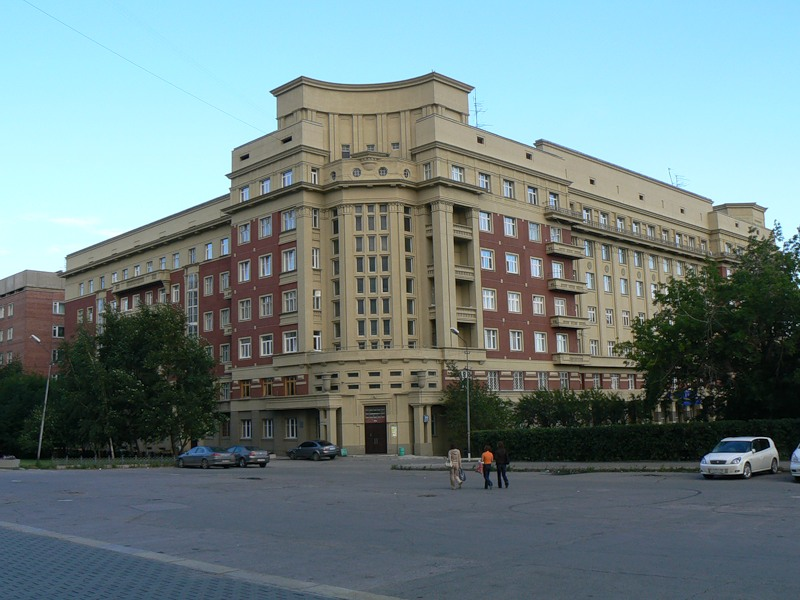
100-flat building. Novosibirsk.

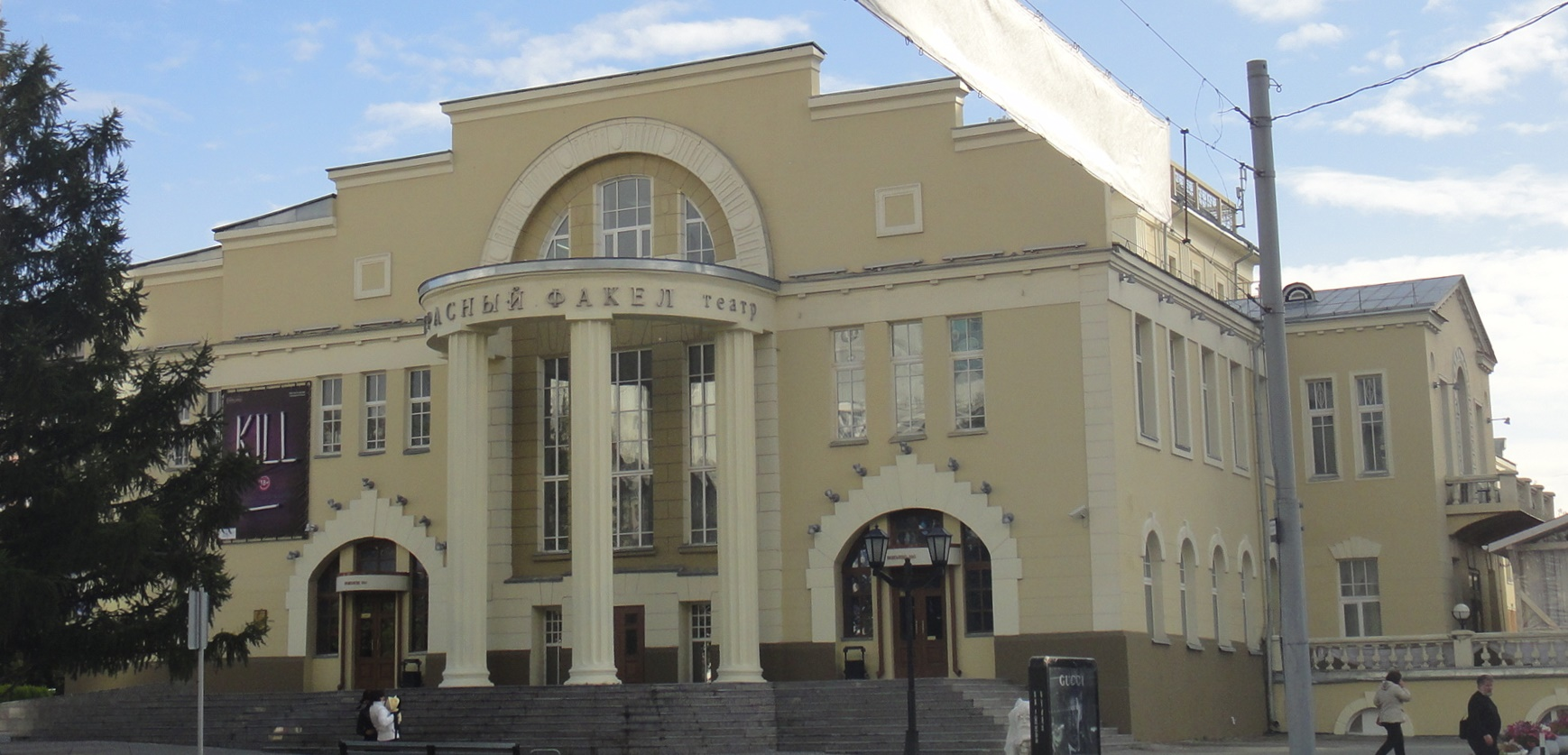
Commercial Club building. Novosibirsk.

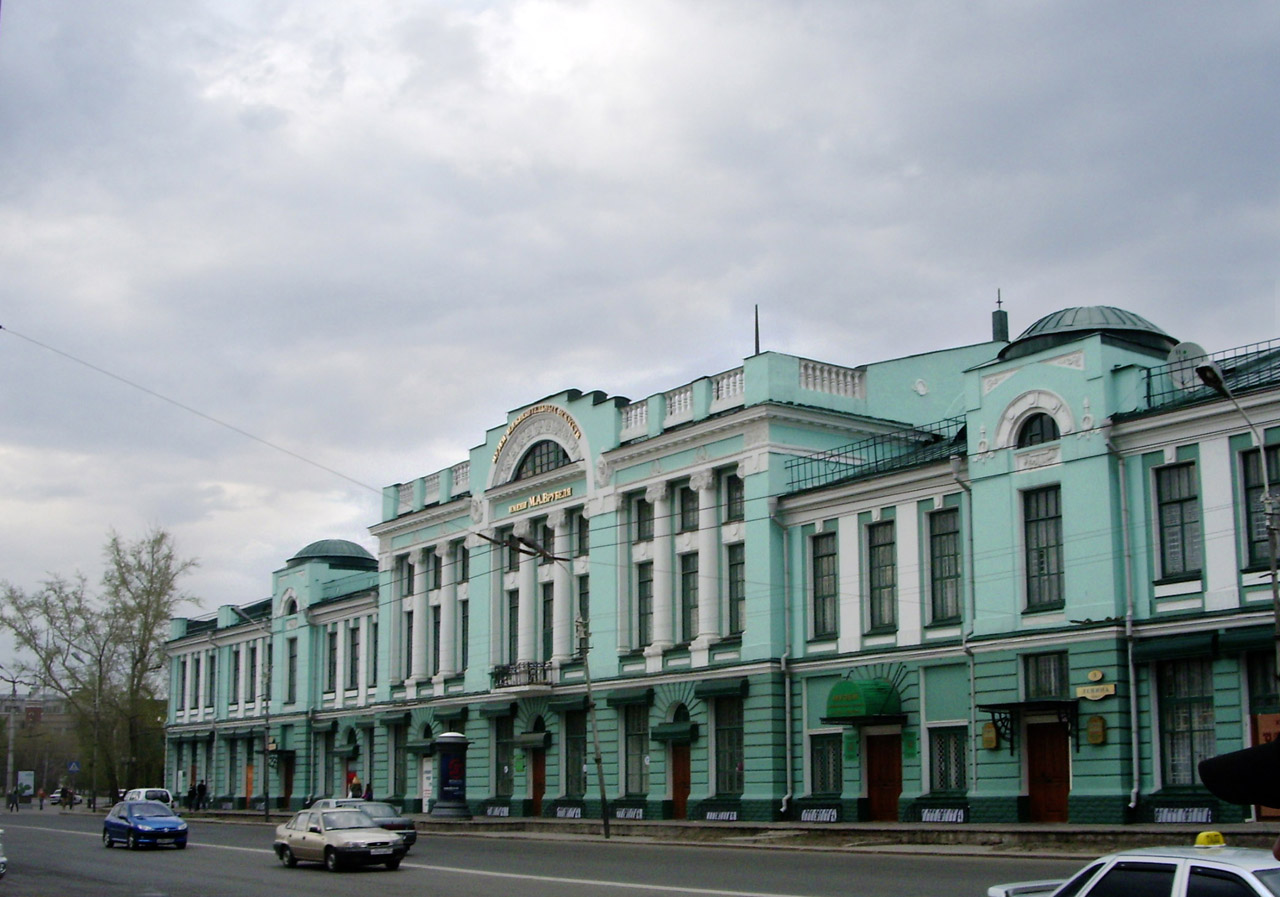
Vrubel Museum. Omsk.

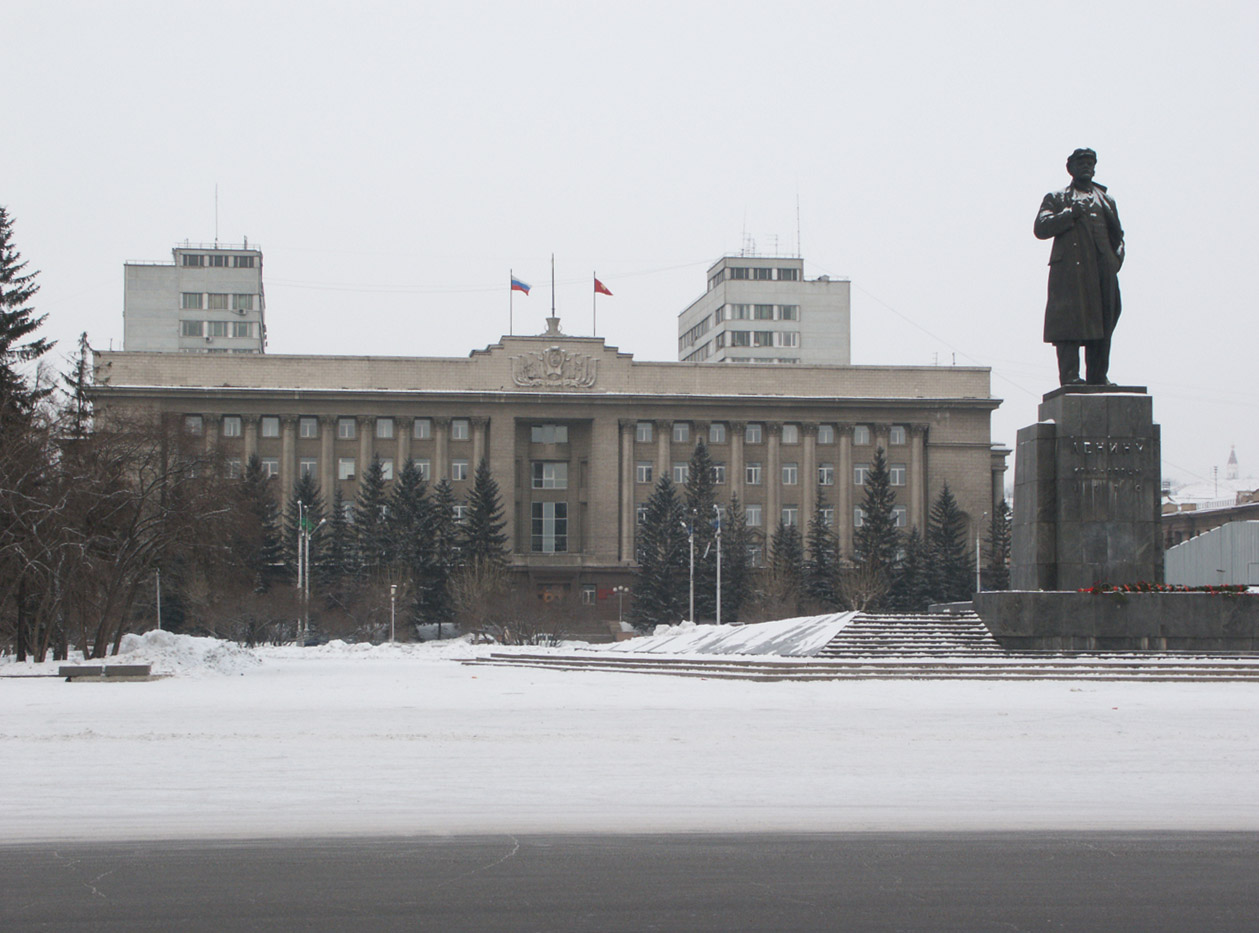
'House of Soviets'. Krasnoyarsk.

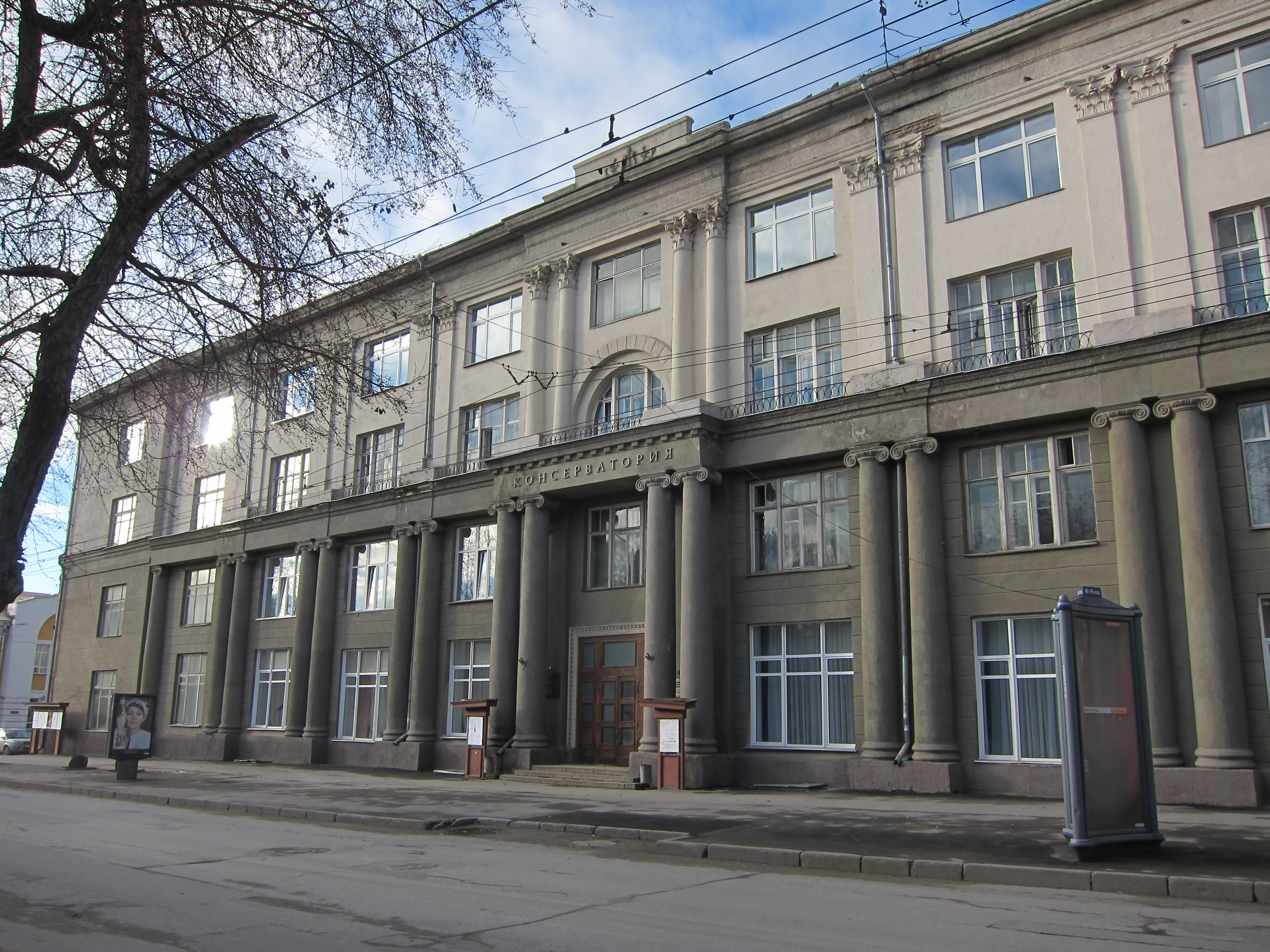
Sibdalgostorg. Novosibirsk.

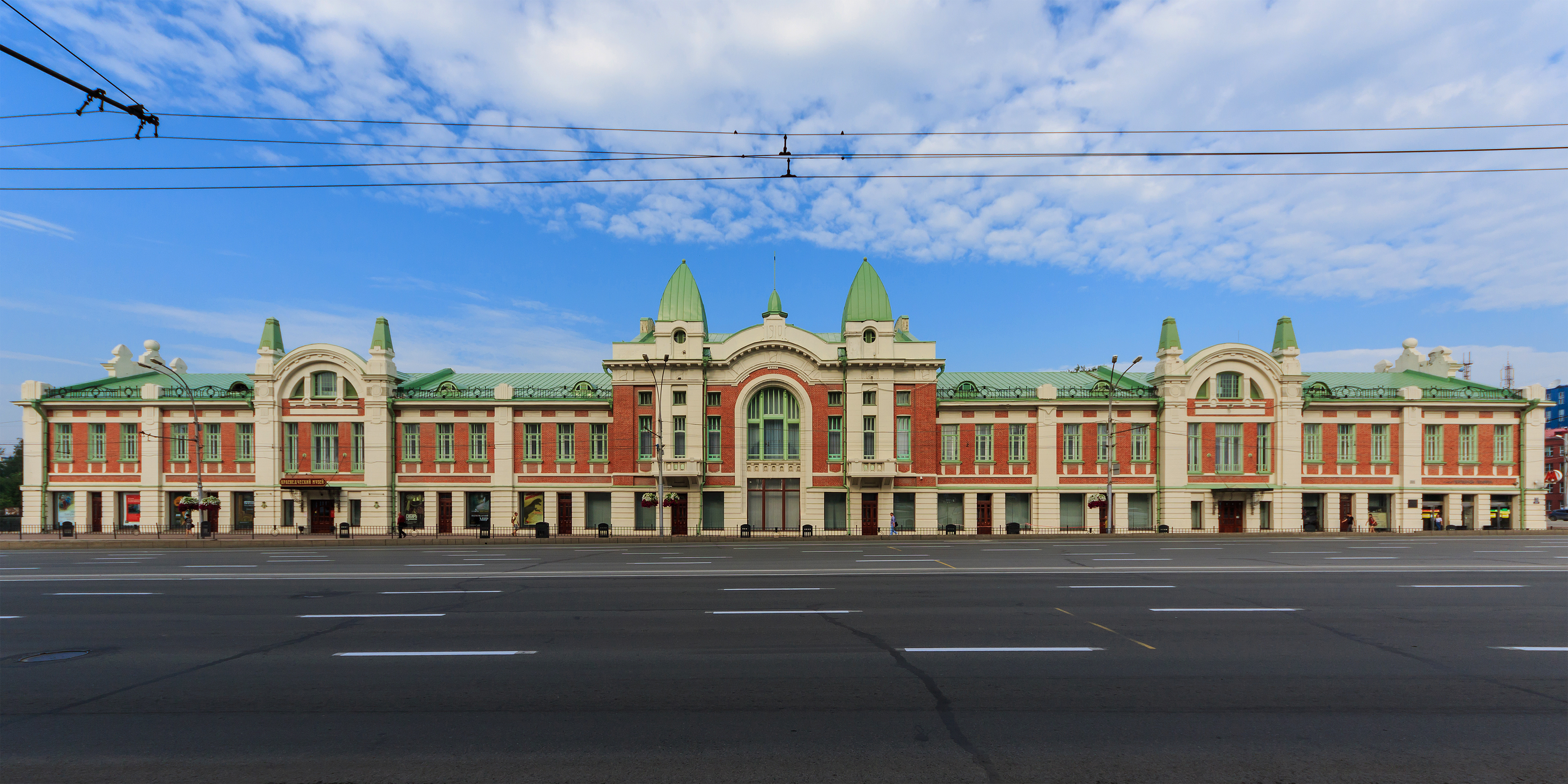
City Trade House. Novosibirsk.

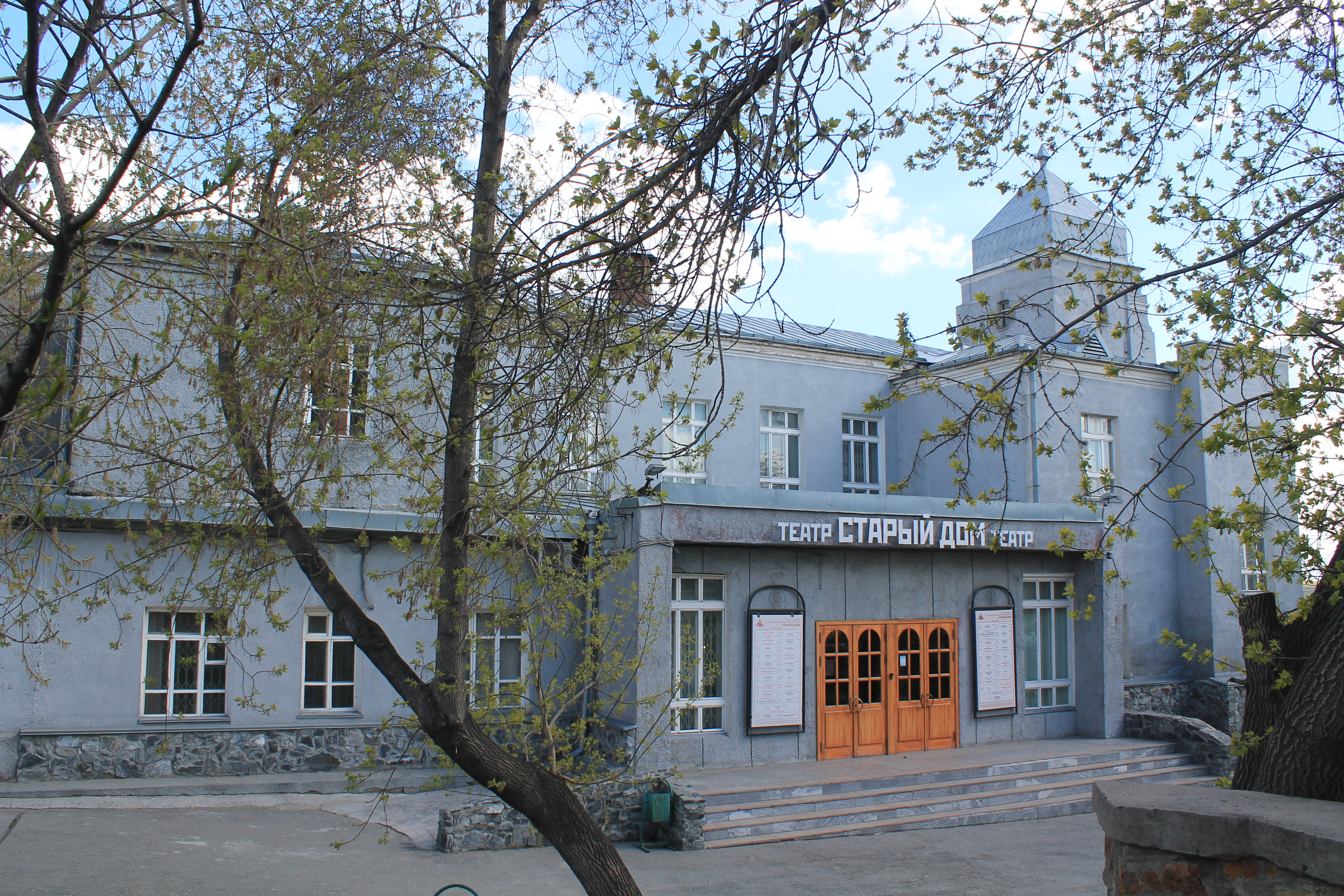
Specialized school. Novosibirsk.

== See also ==
- House of Architect A. D. Kryachkov
