= M5 highway (Russia) =

Federal highway in Russia

Federal Highway M5
- Федеральная автомобильная дорога М5
- Ural Highway

Route information
- Part of E30

- Part of AH6 AH7
- Length: 1,879 km (1,168 mi)

Major junctions
- North end: Moscow
- South end: Chelyabinsk

Location
- Country: Russia

Highway system
- Russian Federal Highways
| ← M 4 | → M 7 |

The Russian route M5 (also known as the Ural Highway) is a major trunk road running across a distance of 1879 km from Moscow to the Ural Mountains. It is part of the European route E30 and the Trans-Siberian Highway. The section from Yekaterinburg to Chelyabinsk is also part of AH7, and the section from Chelyabinsk to Moscow is also part of AH6.

The highway starts at the crossing of the Moscow Ring Road and Volgogradsky Prospekt and runs southeast through Lyubertsy, crossing the Oka River at Kolomna. The Ural Highway continues across nine regions of Russia, passing through a dangerous mountain stretch before terminating at Chelyabinsk. The road continues from Chelyabinsk further east to Omsk, Novosibirsk, Irkutsk as the Russian route R254.

== Route ==
0 km Moscow
23 km Chulkovo
44 km Bronnitsy
70 km Stepanshchino
93 km Kolomna
116 km Lukhovitsy
Ryazan Oblast
181 km Ryazan
302 km Putyatino
345 km Shatsk
Mordvinia
440 km Zubova Polyana
Penza Oblast
472 km Spassk
525 km Nizhny Lomov
593 km Mokshan
634 km Penza
706 km Chaadayevka
745 km Kuznetsk
761 km Yevlashchevo
Ulyanovsk Oblast
822 km Novospasskoye
Samara Oblast
887 km Syzran
930 km Mezhdurechensk
Bridge across the Volga
972 km Tolyatti
1032 km Crossing A300 near Samara
1043 km Krasny Yar
1115 km Sukhodol
1178 km Staraya Balykla
Orenburg Oblast
1204 km Severnoye
Tatarstan
1271 km Bavly
Bashkortostan
1285 km Oktyabrsky, Bashkortostan
1324 km Serafimovsky
1392 km Kob-Pokrovka
1459 km Ufa
Chelyabinsk Oblast
1625 km Yuryuzan
1759 km Miass
1777 km Chebarkul
1855 km Chelyabinsk, Route A310, Route R254

== Gallery ==
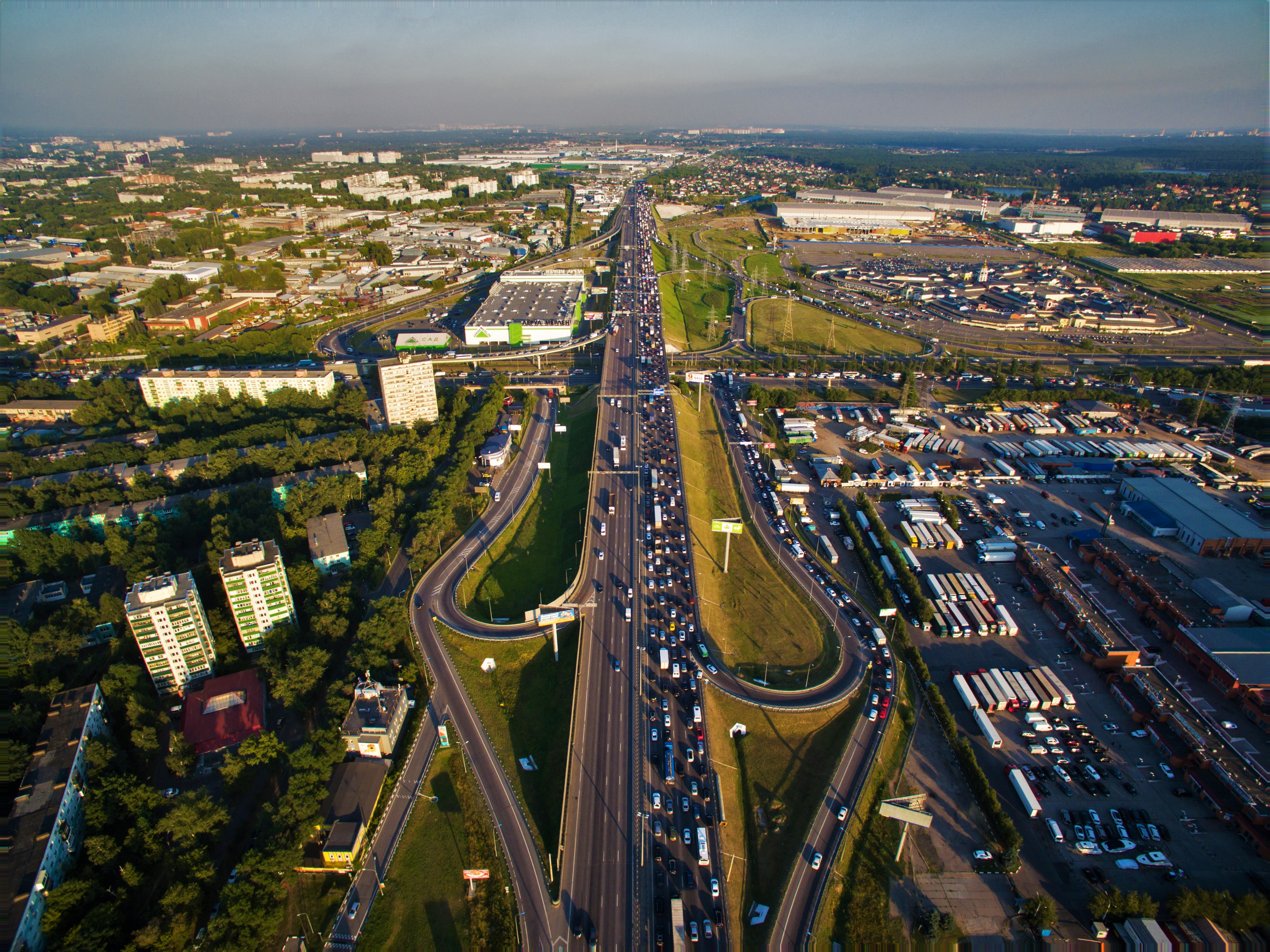

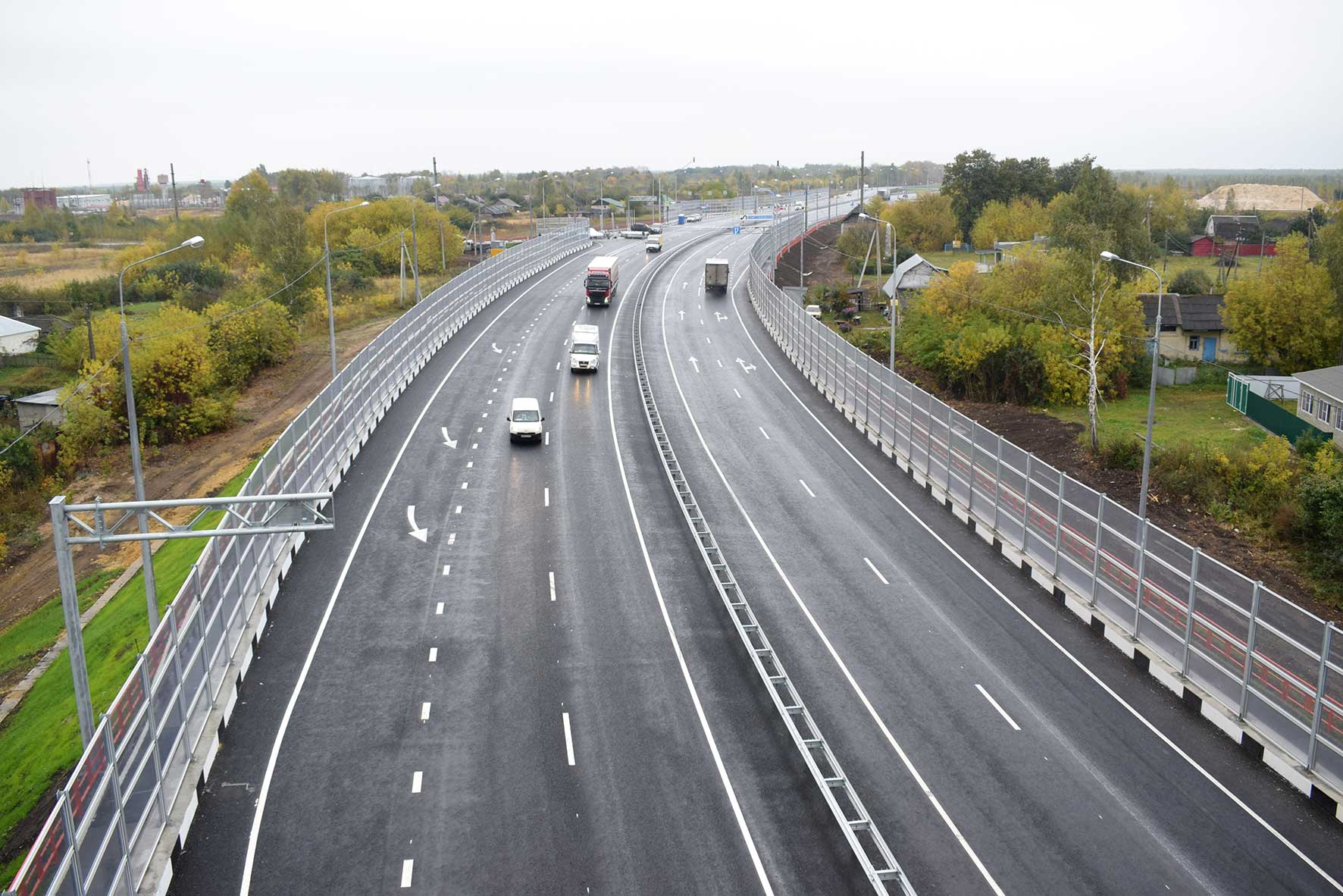

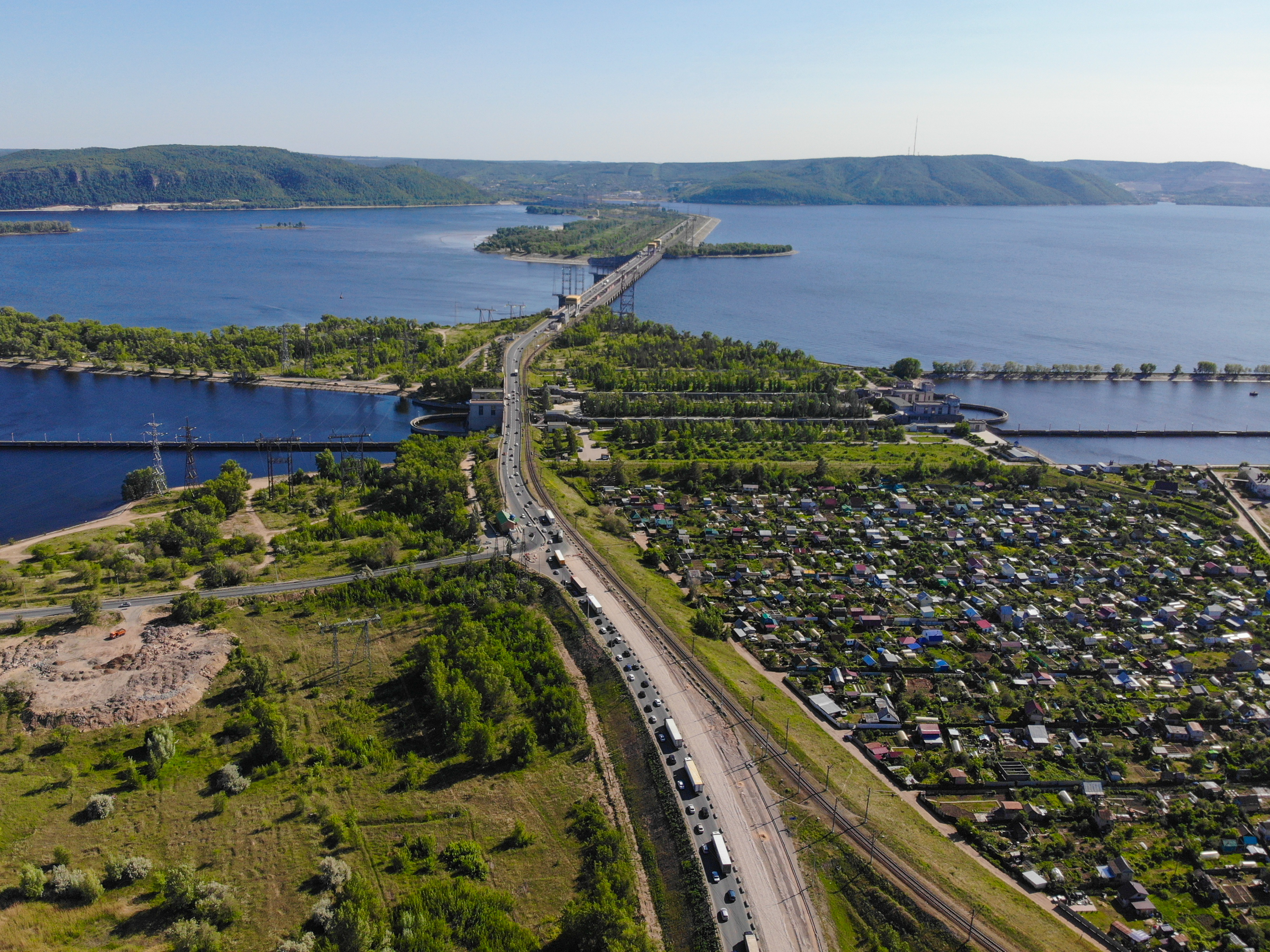

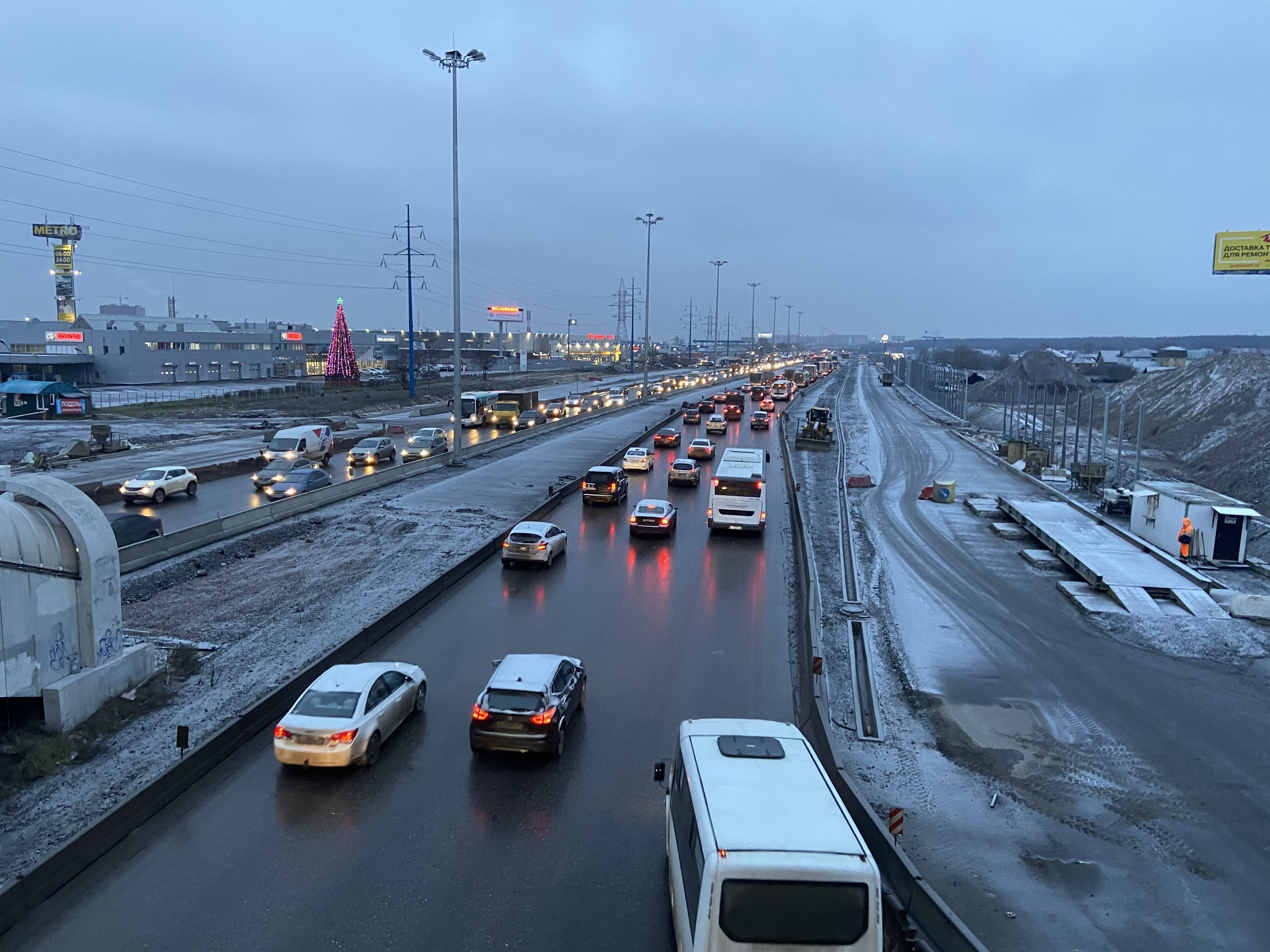
Reconstruction of M5 highway in Moscow Oblast, December 2020.
