= R255 highway =

Road in Russia

Federal Highway R255
- Федеральная автомобильная дорога Р255
- Novosibirsk–Irkutsk Highway
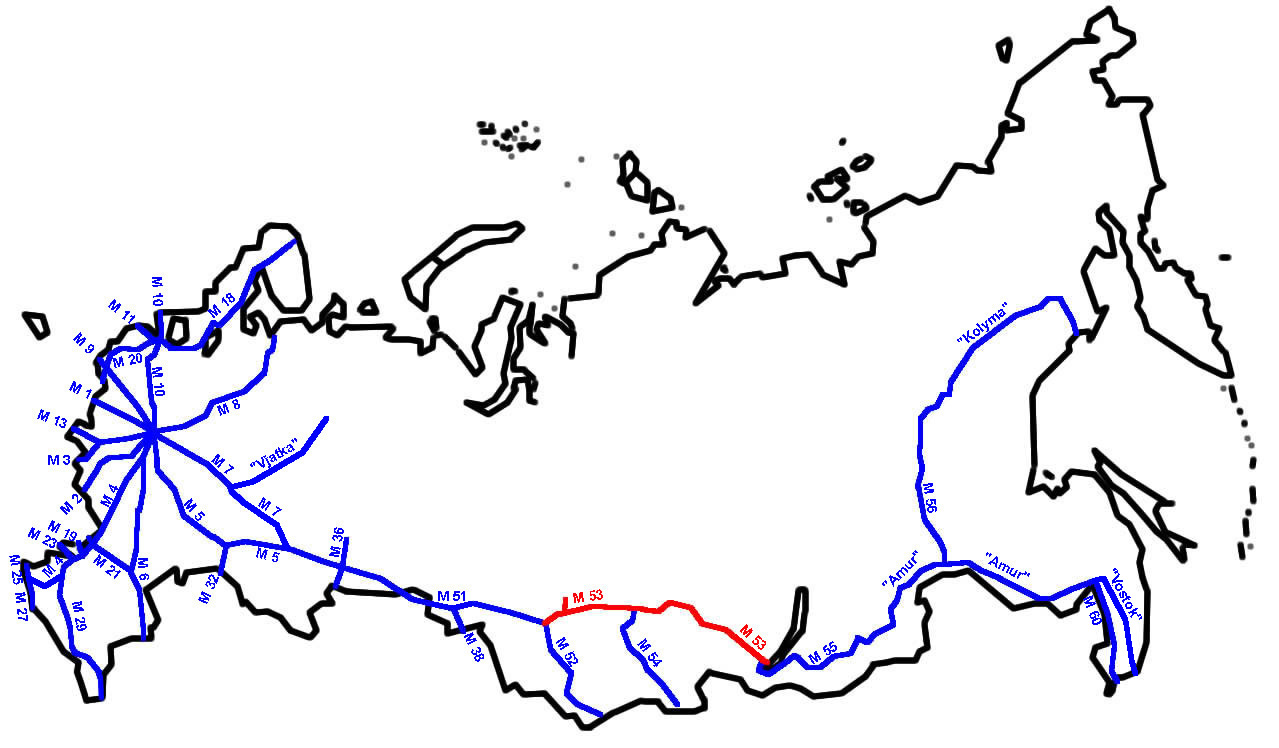

Route information
- Part of AH6
- Length: 1,860 km (1,160 mi)

Major junctions
- West end: R 254 / R 256 in Novosibirsk

- East end: R 258 in Irkutsk

Location
- Country: Russia

Highway system
- Russian Federal Highways
← R 254	→ R 256

The Russian route R255 is a federal highway in Russia, part of the Trans-Siberian Highway: Novosibirsk-(Tomsk-)Kemerovo-Krasnoyarsk-Tayshet-Irkutsk, 1860 km.

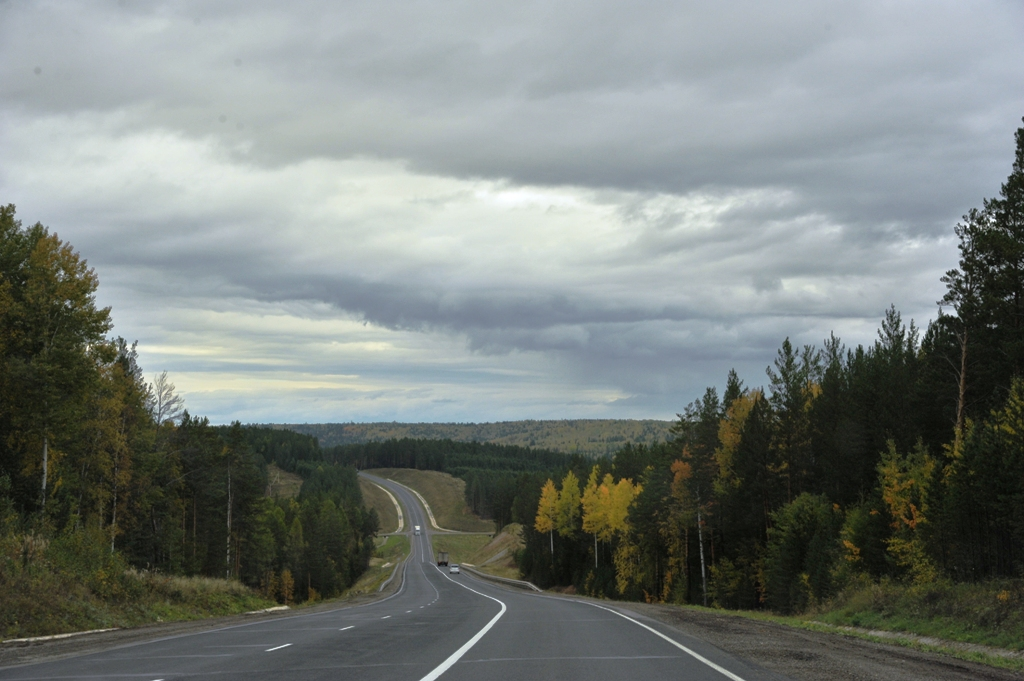

Before 2018, the road was designated as M53.
