= AH6 =

AH6 may refer to:

- Boeing AH-6, an American helicopter gunship
- AH6 (highway), in the Asian Highway Network, spanning South Korea, North Korea, Russia, China, and Kazakhstan
