= R254 highway (Russia) =

Road in Russia

Federal Highway R254
- Федеральная автомобильная дорога Р254
- Chelyabinsk–Novosibirsk
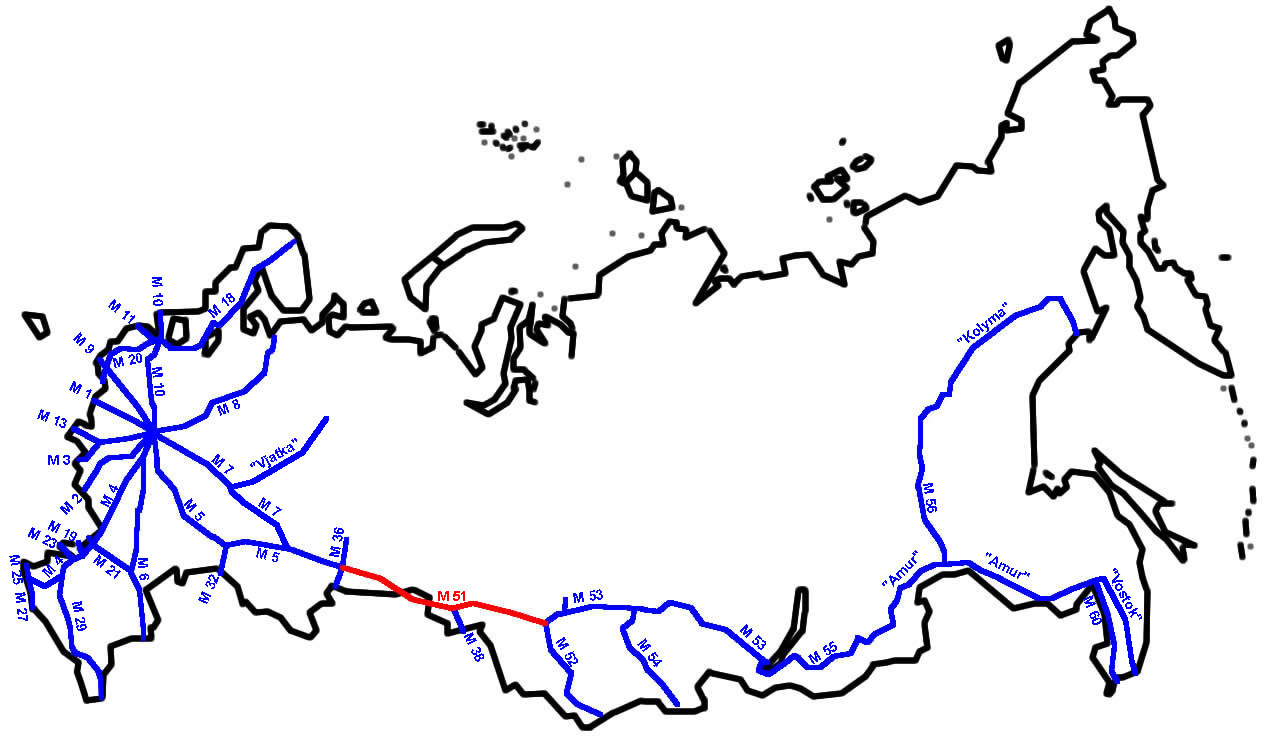

Route information
- Part of E30

- Part of AH6
- Length: 1,528 km (949 mi)

Major junctions
- West end: A 310 in Chelyabinsk

- East end: R 255 / R 256 in Novosibirsk

Location
- Country: Russia

Highway system
- Russian Federal Highways

The Russian route R254 is a federal highway in Russia and Kazakhstan and is part of the Baikal Highway (which is part of the Trans-Siberian Highway). It runs from Chelyabinsk through Kurgan, Petropavl, and Omsk until Novosibirsk, with a total length of 1,528 km (949 mi).

The Chelyabinsk-Omsk stretch is also included into the European route E30.

Before 2018, the route was known as the M51.

== Major cities ==
- Chelyabinsk
- Petropavl
- Omsk
- Novosibirsk

== Gallery ==
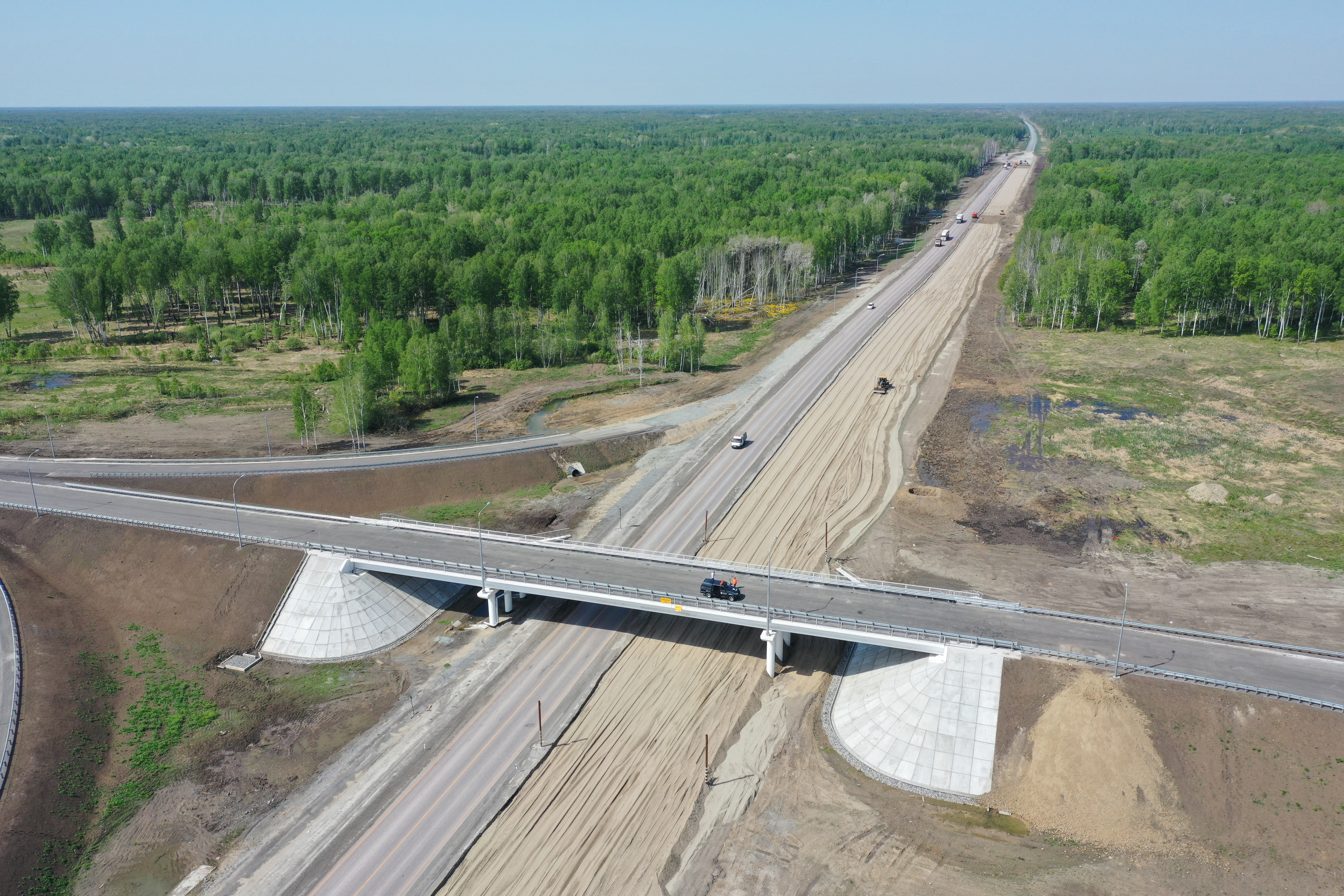
Reconstruction of R-254 "Irtysh" on the section km 1392–1422 in May 2020.

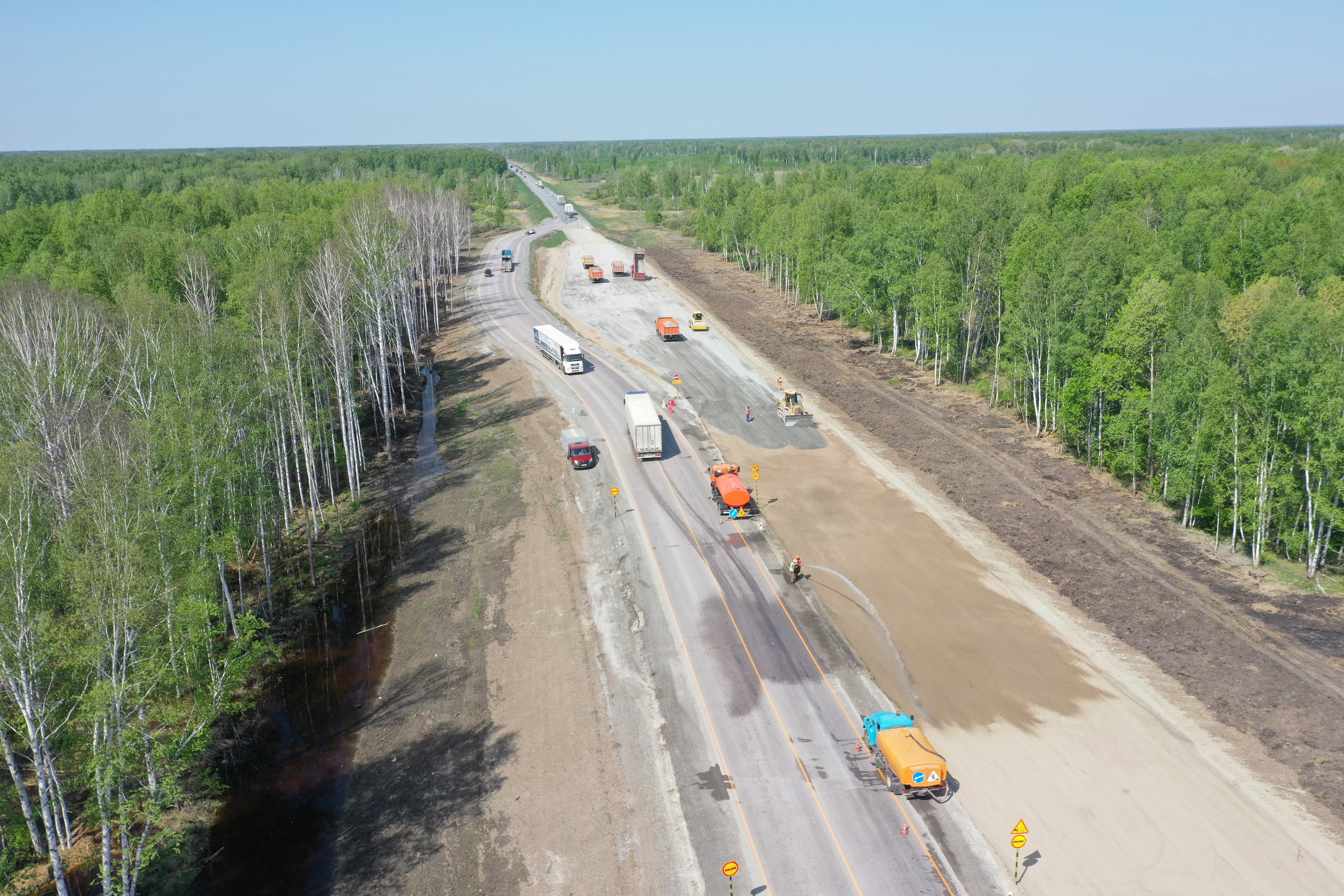
