= European route E24 =

Road in trans-European E-road network

E24

Route information
- Length: 254 km (158 mi)

Major junctions
- West end: Birmingham
- East end: Ipswich

Location
- Countries: United Kingdom

Highway system
- International E-road network; A Class; B Class

The European route E24 is part of the United Nations international E-road network. It runs for 254 km (158 mi) from Birmingham to Ipswich.

== Route ==
The route of the E24 begins at the E5 near Birmingham, where the M6 Toll merges with the M6 and the E5 switches from the M6 Toll to the M42. The E24 heads east on the M6 to its end at the M1 (E13), and continues past the junction onto the A14. The E24 crosses the E15 (A1) at Huntingdon, and continues east along the A14 past Kettering, Huntingdon and Cambridge to the A12 at Ipswich, where the E24 route ends.

The E30, which follows the A12 and A1214 from London to Ipswich, and then the A14 from Ipswich to the port of Felixstowe, forms a continuation of the route to the North Sea.

== Lack of signage ==
Lying completely within the United Kingdom (like the E13 and E32), no part of the E24 is signed as such, the UK authorities never having implemented the provisions for the indication of European route numbers contained in annex 3 of the 1950 Declaration on the Construction of Main International Traffic Arteries signed in Geneva by Belgium, France, Luxembourg, the Netherlands, and the United Kingdom (later joined by 18 other countries) on 16 September 1950.
