= M1 highway (Russia) =

Road in Russia

Federal Highway M1
- Федеральная автомобильная дорога М1
- Belarus Highway

Route information
- Part of E30

- Part of AH6
- Length: 440 km (270 mi)

Major junctions
- West end: Belarusian border
- East end: Moscow

Location
- Country: Russia

Highway system
- Russian Federal Highways
← M 12	→ M 2

Location of M1 in Russia in an old "M" routes network

The Russian route M1 (also known as the Belarus Highway, road to Minsk) is a major trunk road that runs from Moscow through Smolensk before reaching the border with Belarus. The length is 440 kilometers (270 mi). The highway runs south of Odintsovo, Kubinka, Mozhaysk, Gagarin, north of Vyazma, through Safonovo and Yartsevo. After crossing the border with Belarus, the highway continues (as olimpijka) to Minsk, Brest, and Warsaw. The entire route is part of European route E30 and AH6.

During the 1980 Summer Olympics, a 50-kilometer (31 mi) stretch between the 23-kilometer (14 mi) mark and the 73-kilometer (45 mi) mark was used for the road team time trial cycling event.
