= European route E30 =

Road in trans-European E-road network

E30

Major junctions
- West end: Cork, Ireland
- East end: Omsk, Russia

Location
- Countries: Ireland; United Kingdom; Netherlands; Germany; Poland; Belarus; Russia

Highway system
- International E-road network; A Class; B Class

European route E30 is an A-Class European route from the port of Cork in Ireland in the west, to the Russian city of Omsk, near the border with Kazakhstan in the east. For much of the Russian stretch, it follows the Trans-Siberian Highway and, east of the Ural Mountains, with AH6 of the Asian Highway Network, which continues to Busan, South Korea. The total length is 6,530 km (4,060 mi)—3,300 km (2,100 mi) from Cork to Moscow, and 3,230 km (2,010 mi) from Moscow to Omsk. The naming is by the United Nations Economic Commission for Europe (UNECE).

== Itinerary ==
- Ireland
  - N25: Cork ( E201) –Waterford – Wexford ( E01) – Rosslare
- Irish Sea
  - : (Republic of Ireland) Rosslare - (United Kingdom) Fishguard (Stena Line)
- United Kingdom
  Although the United Kingdom Government participates fully in activities concerning the E-routes, E-routes are not signposted within the United Kingdom.
  - A40: Fishguard – Carmarthen
  - A48: Carmarthen –
  - M4: – Heathrow (Interchange with E05 at Newbury)
  - M25: London Orbital (Interchange with E13 at and multiplex with E15 between and)
  - A12: - Ipswich (Interchange with E32 at Colchester)
  - A14: Ipswich (Interchange with E24) – Felixstowe
- North Sea The nearest passenger ferries to Hook of Holland actually depart from Harwich, across the Orwell south of Felixstowe. That ferry has 2 daily departures, one is a day crossing, the other a night crossing, both taking about 7–8 hours. It carries foot (train) passengers and cyclists as well as cars, buses, caravans and freight lorries. The ferry has bunks and rooms available to accommodate those on either crossing. Tickets for Dutch rail travel can be purchased on the ship. Ferries departing from Felixstowe carry freight only.
  - : (United Kingdom) Harwich - (Netherlands) Hook of Holland
- The Netherlands
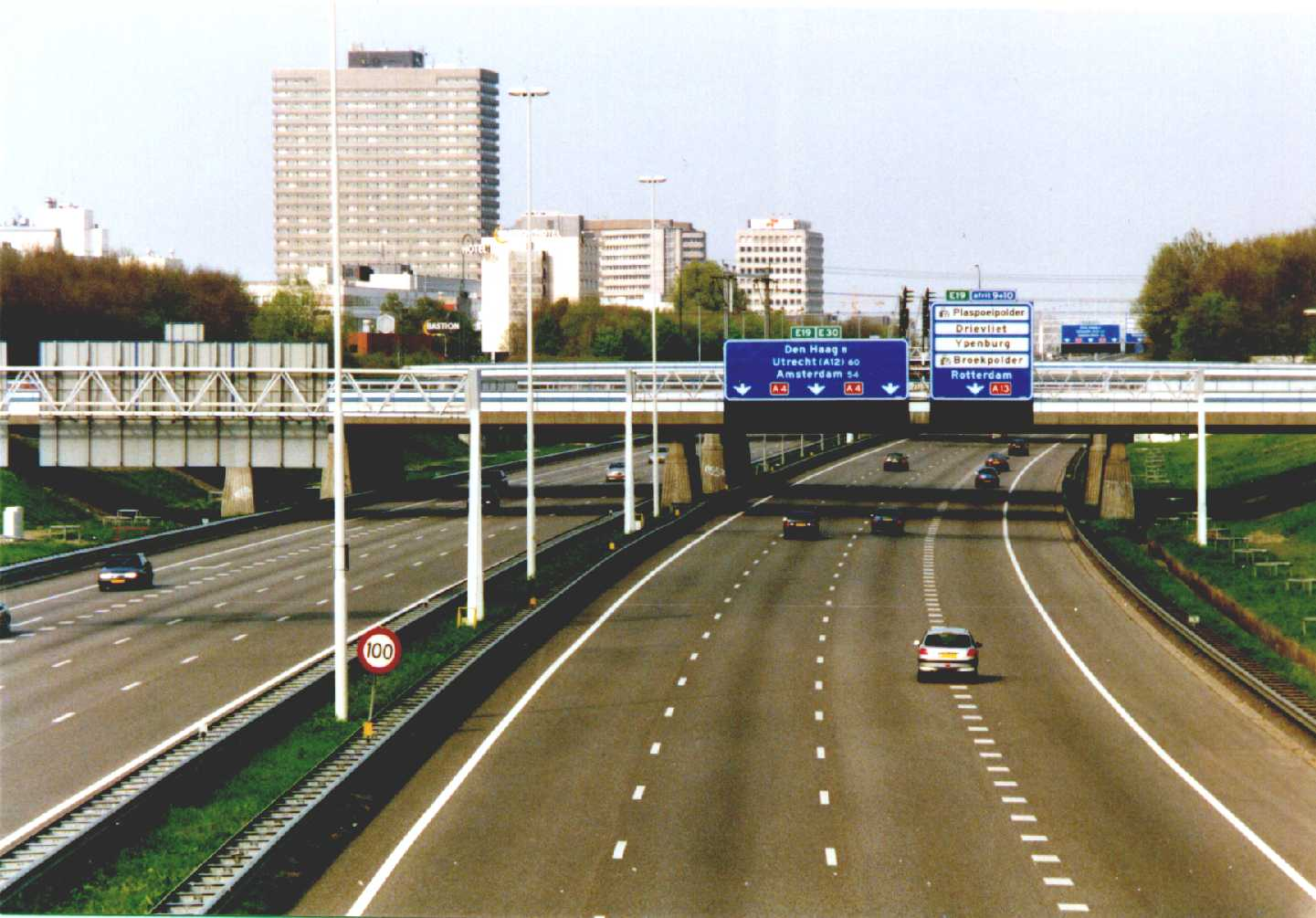
  E30 near The Hague
  - N 211: Hook of Holland ( E25) – The Hague (Den Haag)
  - A 4: The Hague ( E19)
  - A 12: The Hague ( E19) – Gouda (Start of concurrency with E25)– Utrecht ( E35 E311, End of Concurrency with E25)
  - A 27: Utrecht ( E35 E311)
  - A 28: Utrecht – Amersfoort ( E231 E232)
  - A 1: Amersfoort ( E231 E232) – Borne
  - A 1 / A 35: Borne
  - A 1: Borne - Oldenzaal
- Germany
  - A 30: Bad Bentheim – Osnabrück ( E37) – Bünde – Bad Oeynhausen ( E34)
  - A 2: Bad Oeynhausen ( E34) – Hanover ( E45) – Magdeburg ( E49 - Potsdam ( E55)
  - A 10: Potsdam ( E51) - Berlin ( E36 E55) - Königs Wusterhausen ( E55)
  - A 12: Königs Wusterhausen ( E55) - Frankfurt an der Oder
- Poland
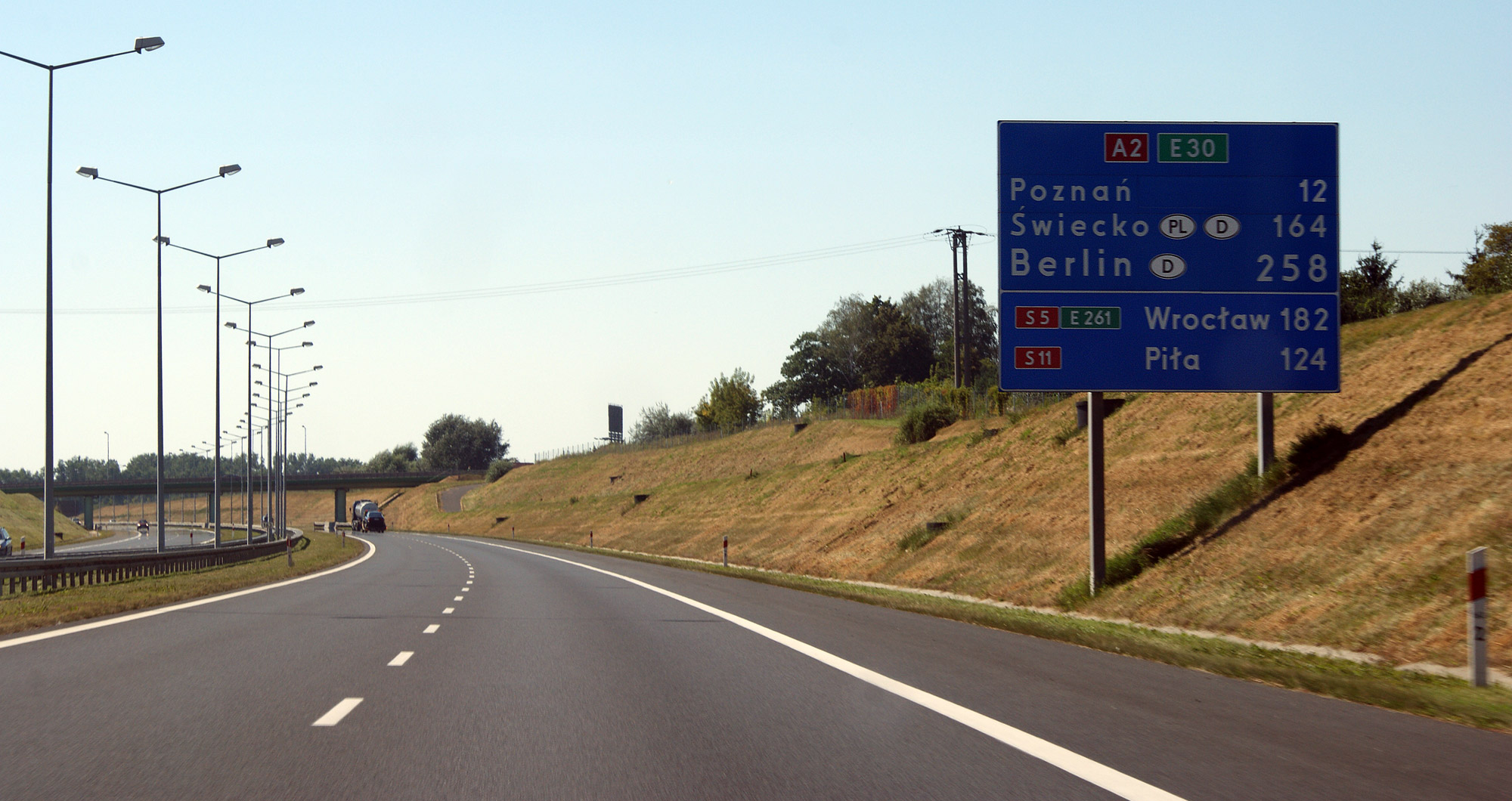
  A2/E30 near Poznań Komorniki interchange
  - A 2: Świecko - Świebodzin ( E65) - Poznań ( E261) - Łódź ( E75) - Łowicz - Warsaw ( E67 E77)
  - S 2: Warsaw ( E67 E77) - Sulejówek ( E372)
  - A 2: Sulejówek ( E372) - Siedlce - Biała Podlaska
  - DK 2: Biała Podlaska - Wólka Dobryńska - Terespol
  - DK 68: Wólka Dobryńska - Kukuryki
- Belarus
  - M 1: Brest - Kobryn (Start of Concurrency with E85) - Ivatsevichy (End of Concurrency with E85) - Baranavichy - Minsk ( E271, Towards E28) - Barysaw - Orsha ( E95) - Dubrowna
- Russia
  - M 1: Smolensk - Moscow
  - MKAD: Moscow ( E22 E101 E105 E115 E119)
  - M 5: Moscow – Ryazan – Penza – Samara ( E121) – Ufa ( E017) –Chelyabinsk ( E123)
  - R 254: (Formerly M 51) Chelyabinsk ( E123 – Kurgan – Ishim ( E22)
  - R 402: Ishim ( E22) - Omsk ( E127)

The Russian stretch of this road coincides partly with the Asian Highway Network's AH6 (though this latter highway passes through Petropavl, Kazakhstan in its stretch between Chelyabinsk and Omsk, unlike the E 30). The E 30 follows the Russian main road M1 Belarus-Moscow, M5 Moscow-Chelyabinsk, and R254 Chelyabinsk-Kurgan. It goes along minor roads past Ishim to avoid the Kazakh border towards Omsk.

== E30 in the United Kingdom ==
Throughout the UK, the Euroroute network is largely unsigned.

The E30 uses primary routes and motorways across the UK and is approximately 355 miles (571 km) between Felixstowe in East Anglia and Fishguard Harbour, Goodwick, in Wales.

=== Felixstowe - London ===
On mainland Europe, the E30 terminates at Hoek-van-Holland where a ferry is required to cross the North Sea to Felixstowe, United Kingdom. The Port of Felixstowe is a major UK freight port with limited passenger operations present. In 2014, Felixstowe handled 28.1 megatonnes of freight, demonstrating the importance of the port within UK import and export sectors, as well as within sectors responsible for the development of UK road infrastructure concerning the E30.

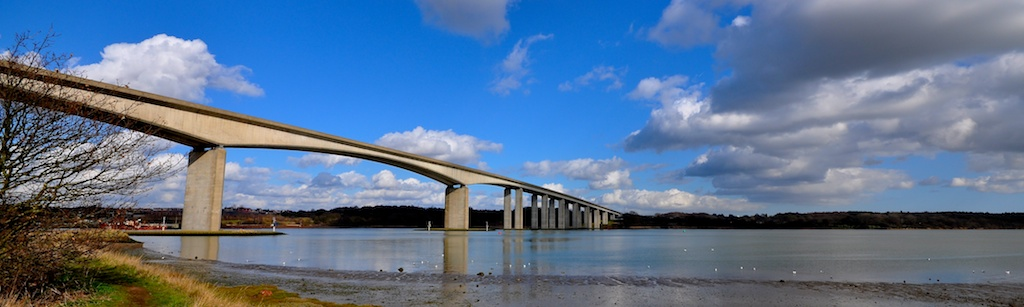
Orwell Bridge west of Felixstowe

The route from Felixstowe to London:

- A14
- Ipswich - The Port of Ipswich handles approximately 2,000,000 tonnes of freight each year according to the Association of British Ports - Ipswich is the UK's largest export port.
- E24 E30 leaves A14 onto the A12.
- (Harwich E32) - The A12 joins the A120/ E32 north of Colchester. The A120 acts as a spur to the Port of Harwich, with Stena Line providing cross-sea access to the rest of Europe for passenger traffic.
- Colchester
- Chelmsford
- Brentwood
- E30 leaves A12 and joins M25 motorway junction 28.

=== London ===
The E30 avoids travelling through the centre of London by using the M25 to the north of London between junctions 28 and 15.

Major connections:

- M11
- A10
- A1(M) E15
- A405
- M1 E13
- A41
- M40
- M4 - M25 junction 15

=== M4 Corridor: London - Bristol ===
To the west of London, the E30 uses the M4 motorway to South Wales. The destinations along this route are linked as part of the M4 corridor, named "Britain's Science Corridor" by the New York Times upon its inception in 1983. This is because the destinations along the M4 route have become "hubs for the UK bases of major global high-tech companies."

The London to Bristol route largely follows that of the Great Western Main Line, which serves as a major infrastructural passenger and freight route between some of the destinations along this section of the E30.

Major destinations along this route include:

- London Heathrow Airport
- Slough
- Maidenhead
- Reading
- Newbury E05
- Swindon
- Bath
- Bristol

=== M4 Corridor: Bristol - Pont Abraham ===
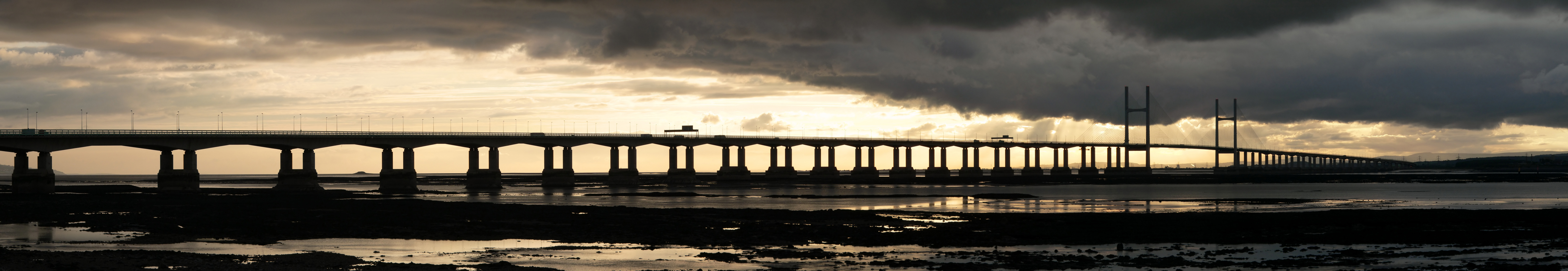
Second Severn Crossing

West of Bristol, the E30 crosses the River Severn over the Second Severn Crossing. The Severn Bridge is used as an alternative to and from Chepstow, which is not directly accessible from the E30. In Wales, the roads which carry the E30 are managed by the South Wales Trunk Road Agent on behalf of the Welsh Assembly Government.

The E30 serves several major industrial destinations in Wales which are largely an extension of "Britain's Science Corridor". These include:

- Chepstow
- Newport
- Cardiff
- Bridgend
- Port Talbot
- Swansea
- Llanelli

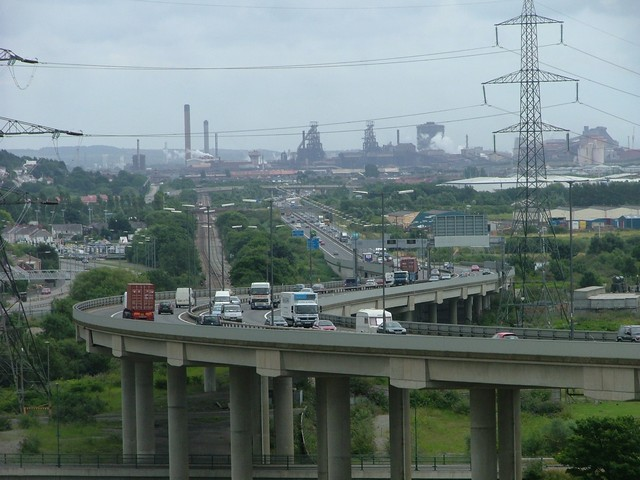
Briton Ferry, Port Talbot

Chepstow is home to several scientific research centres, for example, CreoMedical, a firm which develops medical technologies for hospitals across the UK.

Newport, Cardiff, Port Talbot, Swansea and Llanelli are coastal destinations with sea links. ABP maintains a presence at some of these destinations (not Llanelli, additionally at Barry), and handles over 12 million tonnes of freight each year, contributing over £1.5 billion to the economy. This has been developed thanks to the historic development of infrastructure relating to the South Wales Valleys mining industry in the 20th century, which has since declined in recent decades with the rising imports of foreign oil. This can be shown in the closure of South Wales' last deep mine in 1994.

Cardiff is the capital city of Wales and serves as Wales centre for governance, business and culture. The devolved government of Wales is housed in Cardiff Bay.

In November 2016, Brexit supporter David Rowlands AM (UKIP) argued that the Welsh Government should use trans-European Highways Access funds to maintain the M4 following the UK's departure from the EU. This would be in addition to those which Wales have already received to develop the M4 motorway in Wales. He justified his viewpoint by claiming that a large proportion of all Irish exports, both to the UK and the EU, pass along this route.

=== Pont Abraham - Fishguard ===
The E30 is carried by the A48 and A40 from Pont Abraham - the western terminal of the M4 - to Fishguard.

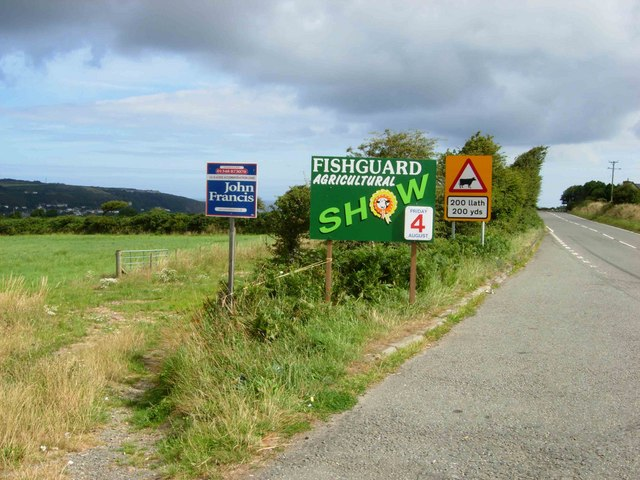
Approaching Fishguard on the A40

Destinations along the A40 are:

- Carmarthen
- Haverfordwest
- (Pembroke Dock)
- (Milford Haven)
- Fishguard

At Fishguard, sea connections can be made to Ireland.

== See also ==
- Category:Constituent roads of European route E30
