= Trans-Siberian Highway =

Network of highways spanning Russia

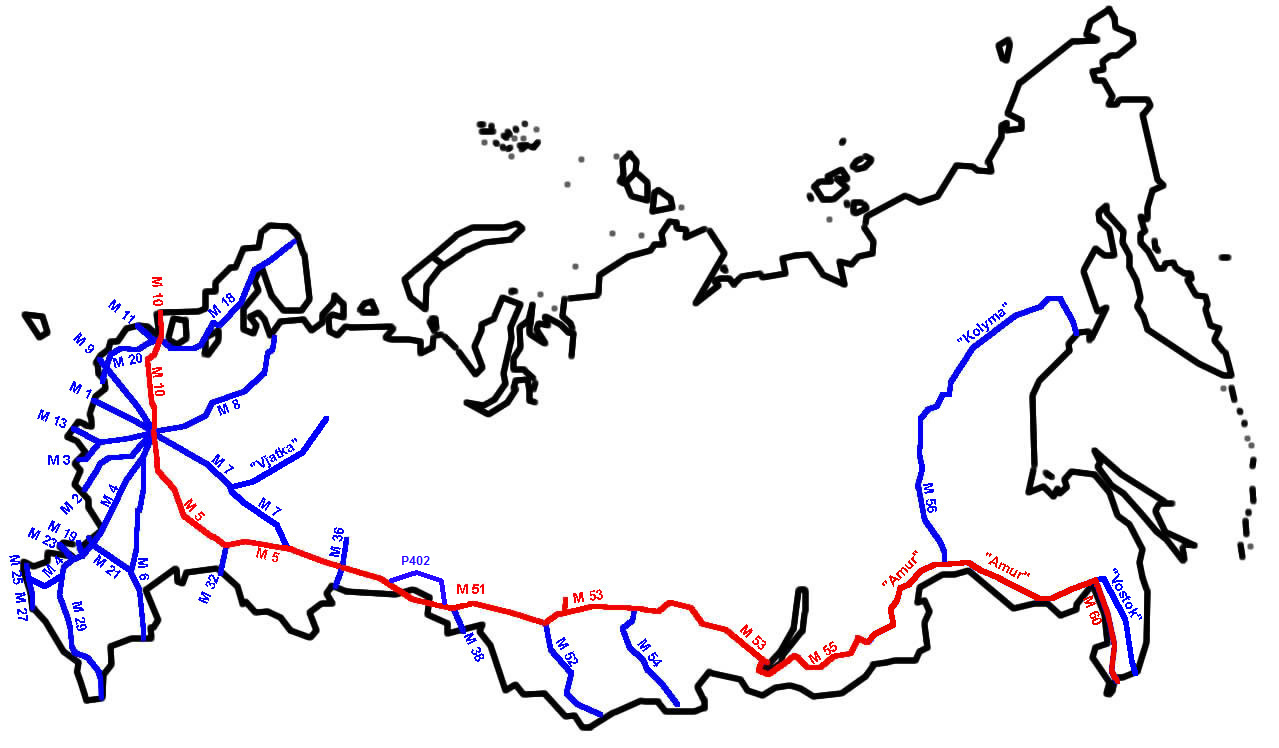
Several roads comprising the Trans-Siberian Highway

The Trans-Siberian Highway is the unofficial name for a network of federal highways that span the width of Russia from the Baltic Sea of the Atlantic Ocean to the Sea of Japan. In the Asian Highway Network, the route is known as AH6. It stretches over 11,000 kilometres (6,800 miles) from St. Petersburg to Vladivostok. The road is the second-longest national highway in the world after Australia's Highway 1.

The highway became fully paved on 12 August 2015.

== Route ==
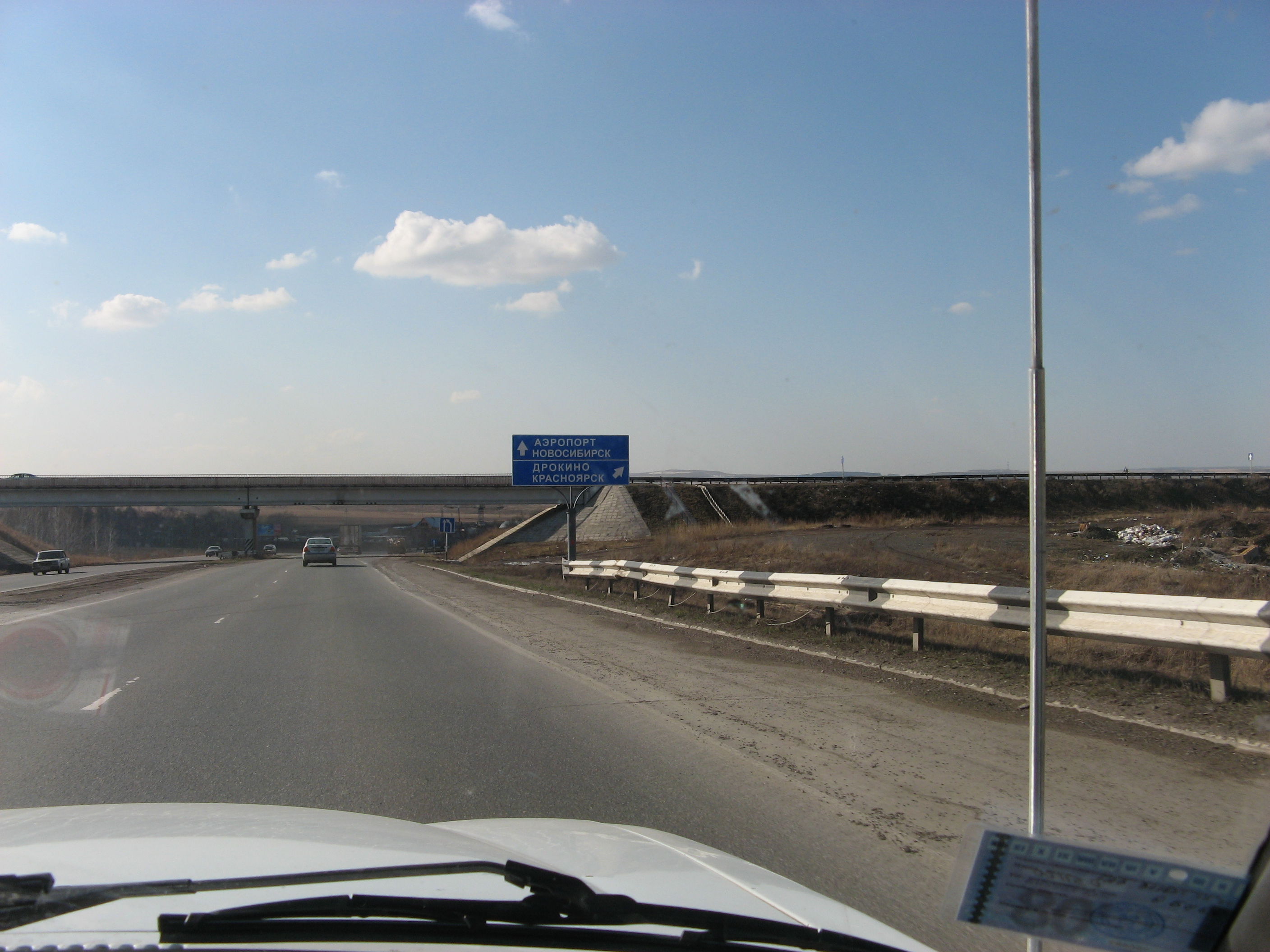
M53 near Krasnoyarsk

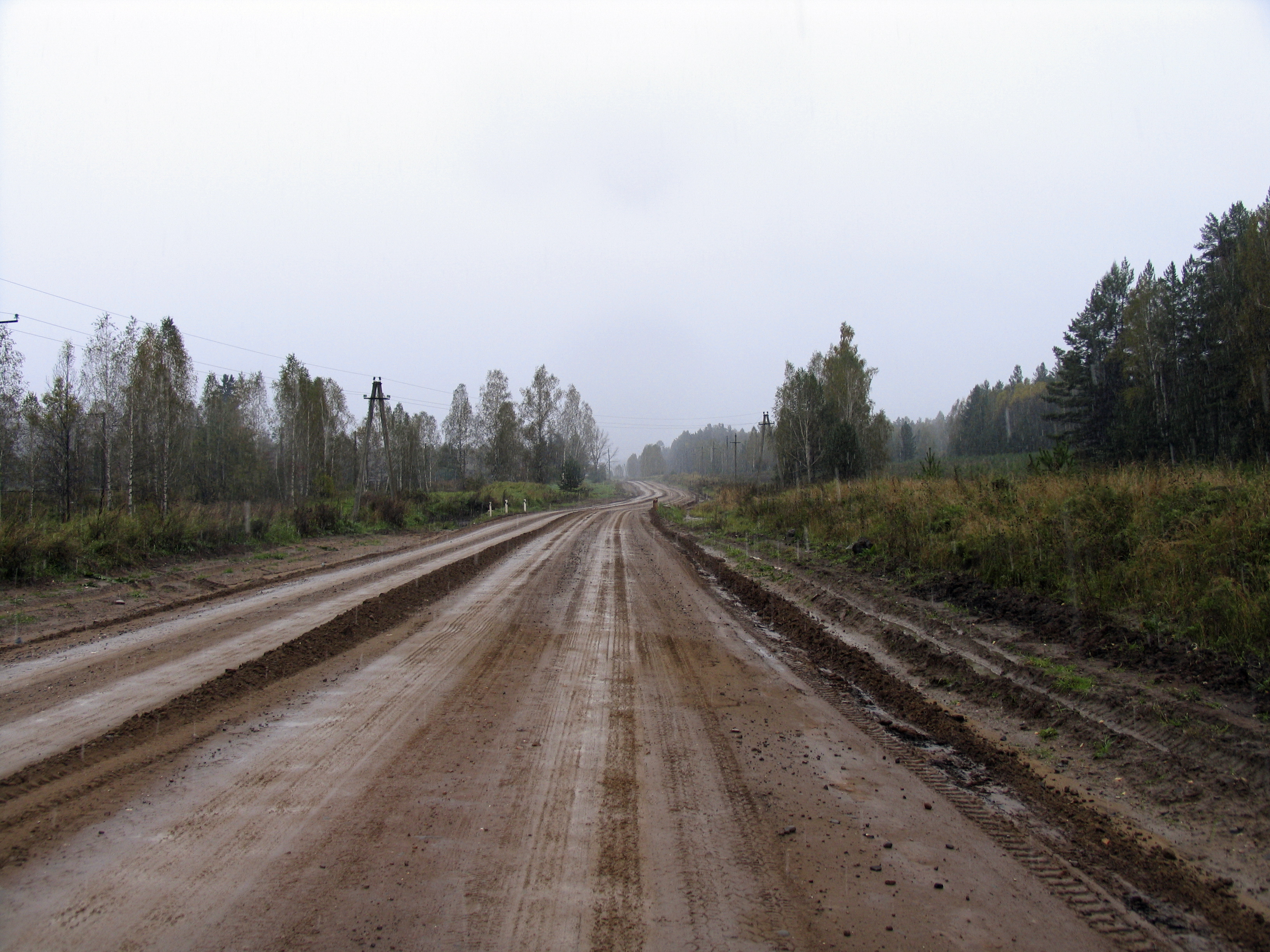
M53 between Krasnoyarsk and Irkutsk before the reconstruction. It is now paved and viewable on Google Street View.

The route coincides in places with European route E30 over a distance of about 190 km (120 mi). One of its segments (Chelyabinsk-Novosibirsk) can be passed by the R402 highway via Ishim inside the Russian territory or by the R254 highway through the neighboring country of Kazakhstan. The route consists of seven federal highways:

- M10 Russia Highway: St. Petersburg-Moscow, 664 km (413 mi)
- M5 Ural Highway: Moscow-Chelyabinsk, 1,880 km (1,170 mi)
- Baikal Highway:
  - R254: Chelyabinsk-Novosibirsk, 1,528 km (949 mi) or 1,630 km (1,010 mi) with R402 bypass highway inside the Russian territory.
  - R255: Novosibirsk-Irkutsk, 1,860 km (1,160 mi)
  - R258 Baikal Highway: Irkutsk-Chita, 1,113 km (692 mi)
- R297 Amur Highway: Chita-Khabarovsk, 2,100 km (1,300 mi)
  - A360 Lena Highway: Major branch leading to Yakutsk and northeast Siberia, 1,235 km (767 mi)
  - R504 Kolyma Highway: Extension of A360 to Magadan, 2,031 km (1,262 mi)
- A370 Ussuri Highway: Khabarovsk-Vladivostok, 760 km (470 mi)

== Amur Highway ==
Until 2010 the most problematic stretch of the highway was between Chita and Khabarovsk. The first section of this route, linking Belogorsk to Blagoveshchensk (124 km in length), was constructed by gulag inmates as early as 1949. Extended and updated between 1998 and 2001, this road forms part of the Asian route AH31 connecting Belogorsk to Dalian in China.

The Chita-Khabarovsk road remained largely unfinished up until early 2004, when Russian President Vladimir Putin symbolically opened the Amur Highway, with great swaths of forest separating major portions from one another. Jim Oliver and Dennis O'Neil rode motorbikes across Russia, along the Trans-Siberian Highway, during the last week of May and the first three weeks of June in 2004: back then, as described in Jim Oliver's book, Lucille and The XXX Road, the section between Chita and Khabarovsk was an extremely challenging undertaking among marsh, gravel, rock, mud (vulnerable to the rasputitsa seasons), sand, washboard, potholes, stream fording and detours of the elusive highway with a noticeable absence of pavement which leads into cases of probable surface tension which can cause the highway to collapse. In the following years the road, in some places was a modern paved highway with painted reflective lane-lines, while in others a single lane meandering, pockmarked, loose-gravel trail following the route of the early 20th century Amur Cart Road. Completion of a 7-metre-wide highway between Chita and Khabarovsk was slated for 2010: now the road is in very good condition, completely upgraded and enlarged and with a smooth surface. The Amur Highway was fully reconstructed and paved in September 2010.

== Old history ==
The road from St. Petersburg to Irkutsk existed already before the railway era. It was featured in the novel Michael Strogoff: The Courier of the Czar by Jules Verne written in 1876.

== See also ==
- Circumbaikal Highway
- Pan-American Highway
- European route E30
- Trans-Siberian Railway
