= European route E32 =

Road in trans-European E-road network

E32

Route information
- Length: 30 km (19 mi)

Major junctions
- West end: Colchester
- East end: Harwich

Location
- Countries: United Kingdom

Highway system
- International E-road network; A Class; B Class

European route E32 is a road in the international E-road network, located completely within the United Kingdom. Although the United Kingdom Government participates fully in activities concerning the E-routes, E-routes are not signposted within the United Kingdom.

The E32 runs between Colchester and Harwich, and is 30 kilometres (19 mi) in length, making it one of the shortest E-roads. It follows the A120 road. In the western part it is similar to a motorway but not signposted as such. The rest is ordinary road. It carries many heavy vehicles. It connects to the E30 and to the ferries from Harwich to Belgium, Netherlands, Germany and Denmark.
