= AH6 (highway) =

Asian Highway route in Russia and China

Asian Highway 6

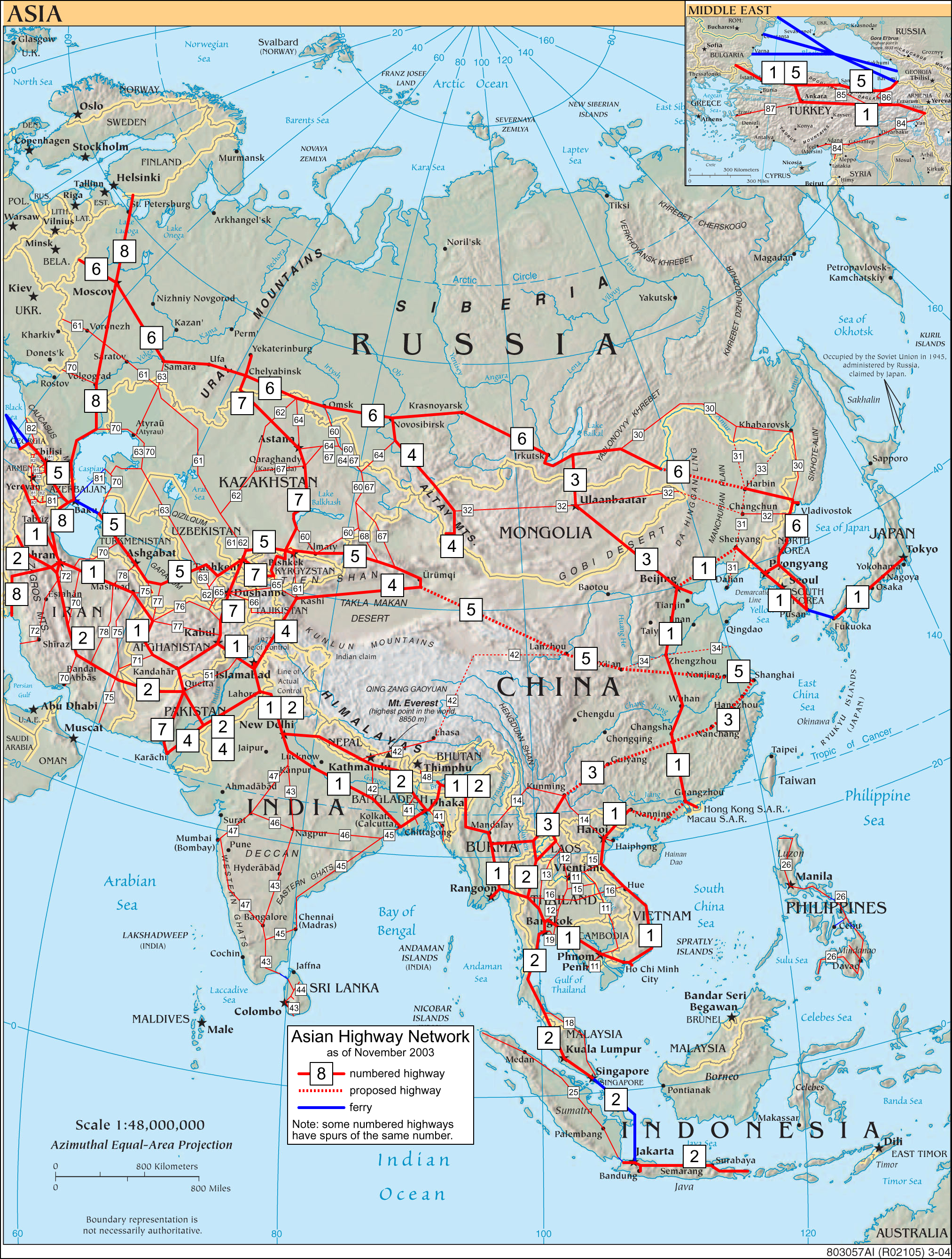

Route information
- Length: 10,533 km (6,545 mi)

Major junctions
- East end: AH1 in Busan, South Korea
- West end: E30 in Krasnoe, Krasninsky, Russia

Location
- Countries: Russia, Kazakhstan, China, North Korea, South Korea

Highway system
- Asian Highway Network
← AH5	→ AH7

Asian Highway 6 (AH6) is a route in the Asian Highway Network in Asia and Europe. It runs from Busan, South Korea (on AH 1) to the border between Russia and Belarus. Altogether it is 10,533 kilometres (6,545 mi) long.

For much of its Russian stretch, AH6 coincides with the unofficial Trans-Siberian Highway and, west of the Ural Mountains, with European route E30 of the International E-road network.

== Associated routes ==
=== South Korea ===
- Busan Metropolitan Road 61 : Busan-Centre - Busan-Nopo-dong
- National Route 7: Busan- Nopo-dong - Ulsan (Munsu Interchange)
- Donghae Expressway: Ulsan - Pohang(S.Pohang IC)
- National Route 7 (Donghaedae-ro) : Pohang - Samcheok
- Donghae Expressway: Samcheok - Gangneung - Sokcho
- National Route 7: Sokcho - Goseong

=== North Korea ===
- 7 Wonsan–Mount Kumgang Motorway: Kosong - Wonsan
  - Branch: 8 Pyongyang–Wonsan Motorway: Wonsan - Pyongyang
- 5 7 Wonsan - Hamhung
- 7 Hamhung - Sinpo - Tanchon - Kimchaek - Chongjin - Sobong (Rason)
- 92 Sobong - Hongŭi-ri (홍의리)
- 93 Hongŭi-ri (홍의리) - Chosal-li (조산리)

=== Russia (east) ===
- 05A-214 : border with North Korea – Yakov Novichenko Bridge - Khasan - Razdolnoye
- Razdolnoye – Artyom – Vladivostok (no road numbers assigned, but 05A-615 / 05K-605 within Artyom)
- 05A-608 (branch): Vostochny Port – Nakhodka – Artyom
- A 370: Vladivostok - Ussuriysk
- 05A-215 : Ussuriysk - Pogranichny - border with China

=== China ===
- G10: Suifenhe - Harbin - Qiqihar - Manzhouli

=== Russia (middle) ===
- A 350: border with China - Zabaykalsk - Chita
- R 258: Chita - Ulan-Ude - Irkutsk
- R 255: Irkutsk - Krasnoyarsk - Kemerovo - Novosibirsk
- R 254: Novosibirsk - Omsk - Isilkul

=== Kazakhstan ===
==== Post 2024 road numbering scheme ====
- KZ15-10 : Karakoga - Petropavl
- KZ15-09 : Petropavl Bypass
- KAZ02 : Petropavl - Mamlyut - Chistoe

==== 2011-2024 road numbering scheme ====
- M-51 : Karakoga - Petropavl
- P-49 : Petropavl Bypass
- M-51 : Petropavl - Mamlyut - Chistoe

=== Russia (west) ===
- R 254: Petukhovo - Kurgan - Chelyabinsk
- M 5: Chelyabinsk - Ufa - Samara - Penza - Ryazan - Moscow
- M 1: Moscow - Krasnoye (Belarus: M1 highway)
