= R256 highway (Russia) =

Road in Russia

Federal Highway R256
- Федеральная автомобильная дорога Р256
- Chuya Highway; Чуйский тракт
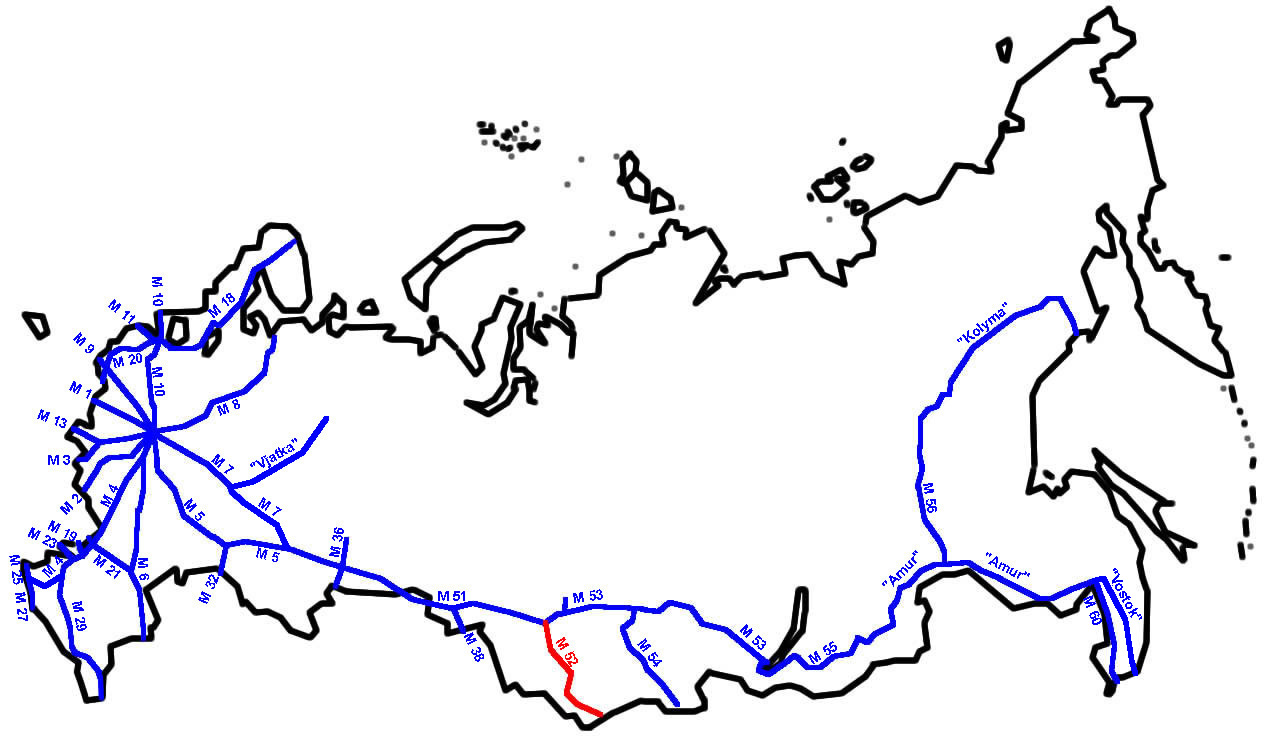

Route information
- Part of AH4
- Length: 953 km (592 mi)

Major junctions
- North end: Novosibirsk
- South end: Mongolian border

Location
- Country: Russia

Highway system
- Russian Federal Highways
← R 255	→ R 257

The Russian route R256 is a trunk road in Novosibirsk Oblast, Altai Krai and Altai Republic of Russia. Its length is 953 kilometres. The width is 7 metres. It is also a part of the Asian Highway AH4.

The highway, constructed in the early 1930s by gulag inmates, extends from Novosibirsk to Russia's border with Mongolia, passing through Berdsk, Novoaltaysk, Biysk, but bypassing Barnaul and Gorno-Altaysk.

Between Novosibirsk and Biysk the road follows the right bank of the Ob River, then traverses a steppe region and the Altay Mountains, where it continues through the altitudes of up to 2000 metres.

On November 17, 2010, in accordance with Government Resolution 928, the M52 was given a new designation, R256 (in Cyrillic Р256); the M52 designation was used until the end of 2017 when the highway was officially designated as R256.

== Chuya Highway ==
The Chuya Highway or Chuysky Trakt (Чуйский тракт) is the old name of the road connecting Russia and Mongolia.

The part of the Р256 road from Biysk to Tashanta is traditionally referred to as the Chuya Highway or Chuysky Trakt. This part of the road is 610 km long.

The Chuya Highway is laid over the ranges of Altai Mountains along the rivers Katun and Chuya, over Seminsky and Chike-Taman mountain passes.

This route had been pretty rough; the carriage way was erected only in the early 20th century.

Prior to that it was where the northern caravan tracks of the Great Silk Road passed. The caravans followed the routes formed along the migration ways of wild animals.

=== Main stages of construction ===
- Spring 1901 – construction of the Chuya Highway started.
- Middle 1903 – the carriage way between Ongudai and Kosh-Agach was finished.
- Summer 1913 года – engineering of the highway started. It was interrupted by World War I.
- In autumn 1932 prisoners from Department 7 of Siberian prison camps (SibLAGs) were the main manpower along the whole Chuya Highway.
- January 1, 1935, was commissioned along its entire length (Biysk – Maima – Ust-Sema – Cherga – Ongudai – Inya – Kosh-Agach).
- The whole highway was coated with asphalt in the early 21st century.

=== Role ===
The Chuya Highway is the major infrastructural object of the Altai Republic where there is no railway. The Chuya Highway is basically the most important and stressed road connecting the region with its neighbours.

Tourism is the principal activity in Altai. Apart from commercial connections, the Chuya highway ensures traffic convenience for tourists and travelers.

=== Tourism ===
The most visited objects along the Chuya Highway include:

- Manzherok mountain ski resort
- Chike-Taman mountain pass
- Chuya and Katun rivers junction
- Petroglyphs of Kalbak-Tash ecosite
- Geyser lake
- Colourful mountains Kysyl-Chin

==== Flow of tourist ====
- During the USSR period hiking was the most popular in Altai. The Chuya highway was the starting point of a lot of hiking routes: to Shavla lakes, Aktru glacier, etc. The majority of hikers arrived from the USSR itself. Only a few of them arrived from the Baltic States and Eastern Germany.
- In the early 2000, after the Chuya highway was asphalted along its entire length, the number of tourists from Russia increased manifold. In the beginning they were mostly from the nearest regions (Novosibirsk, Tomsk, the Kuzbas). Those visitors got the information from their friends. Starting from 2005 Altai the flow of visitors from the central Russia started.
- Starting from 2014 foreigners started to flood Altai. This was encouraged by a couple of important events:
1. National Geographic included the Chuya highway into the list of 10 most spectacular highways of the world (position 5)
2. In 2018 the information about Altai was published in the European mass media where it was widely discussed due to the investigation on corruption in relation to Igor Dodon.
Chuysky Trakt

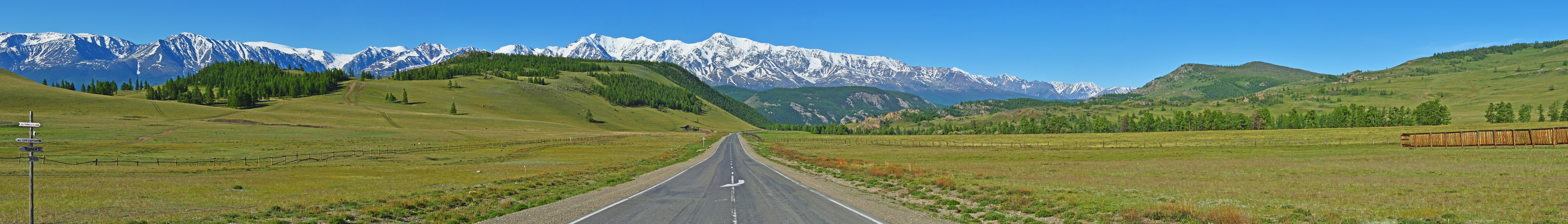
Chyusky Trakt with North Chuya Range

Chike-Taman Pass

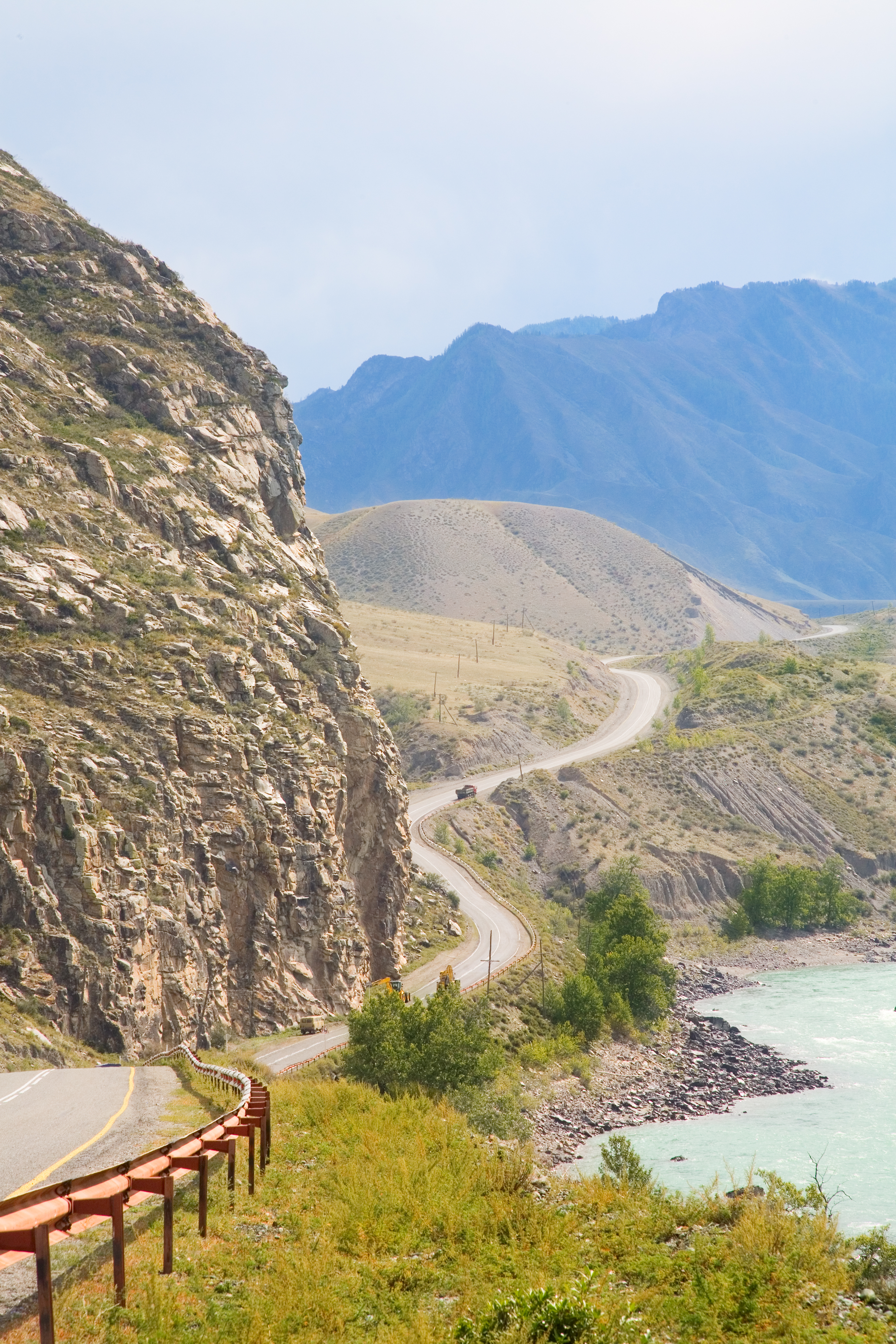
Old name of the road M52

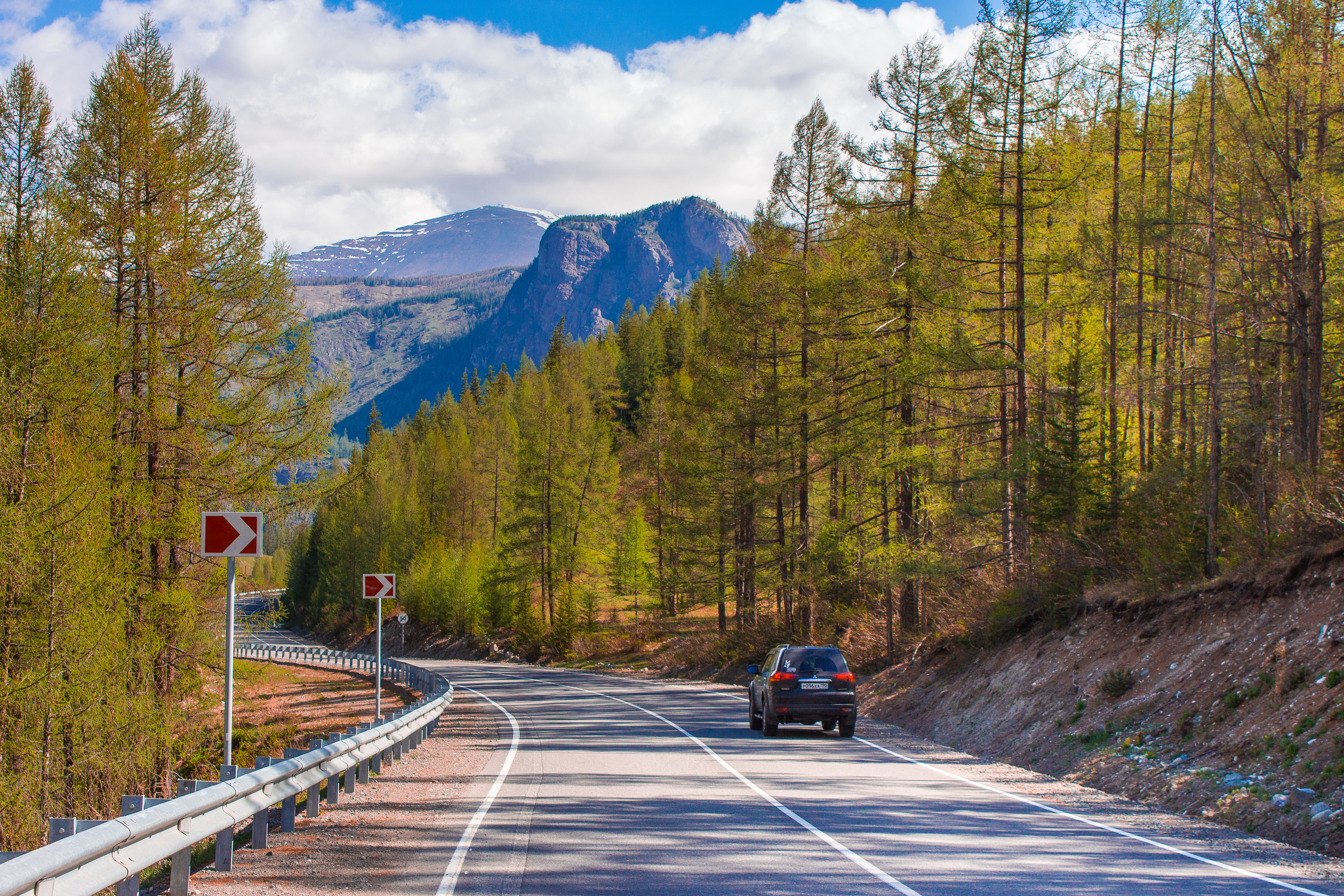
Chyusky Trakt

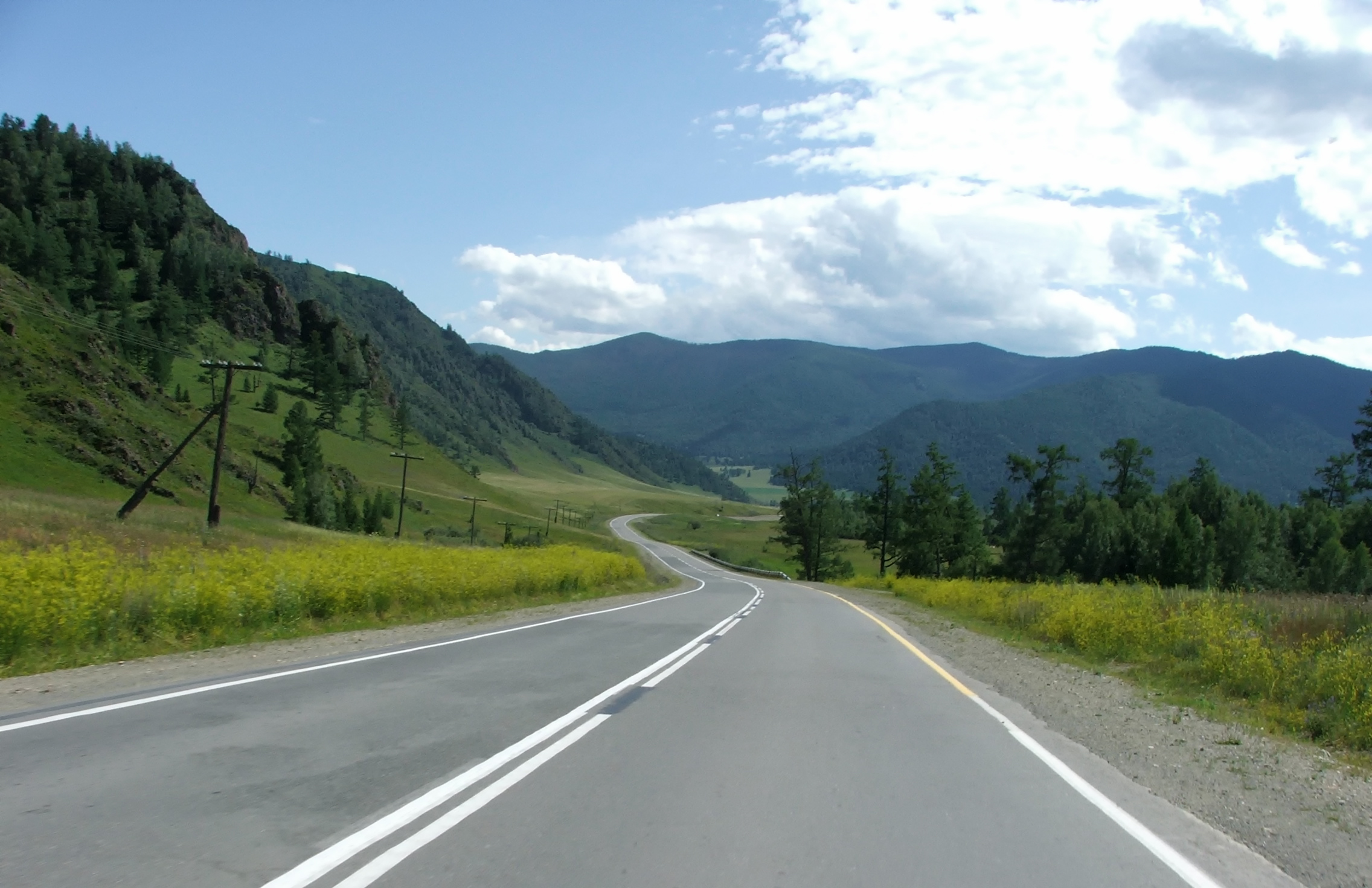
Seminsky pass

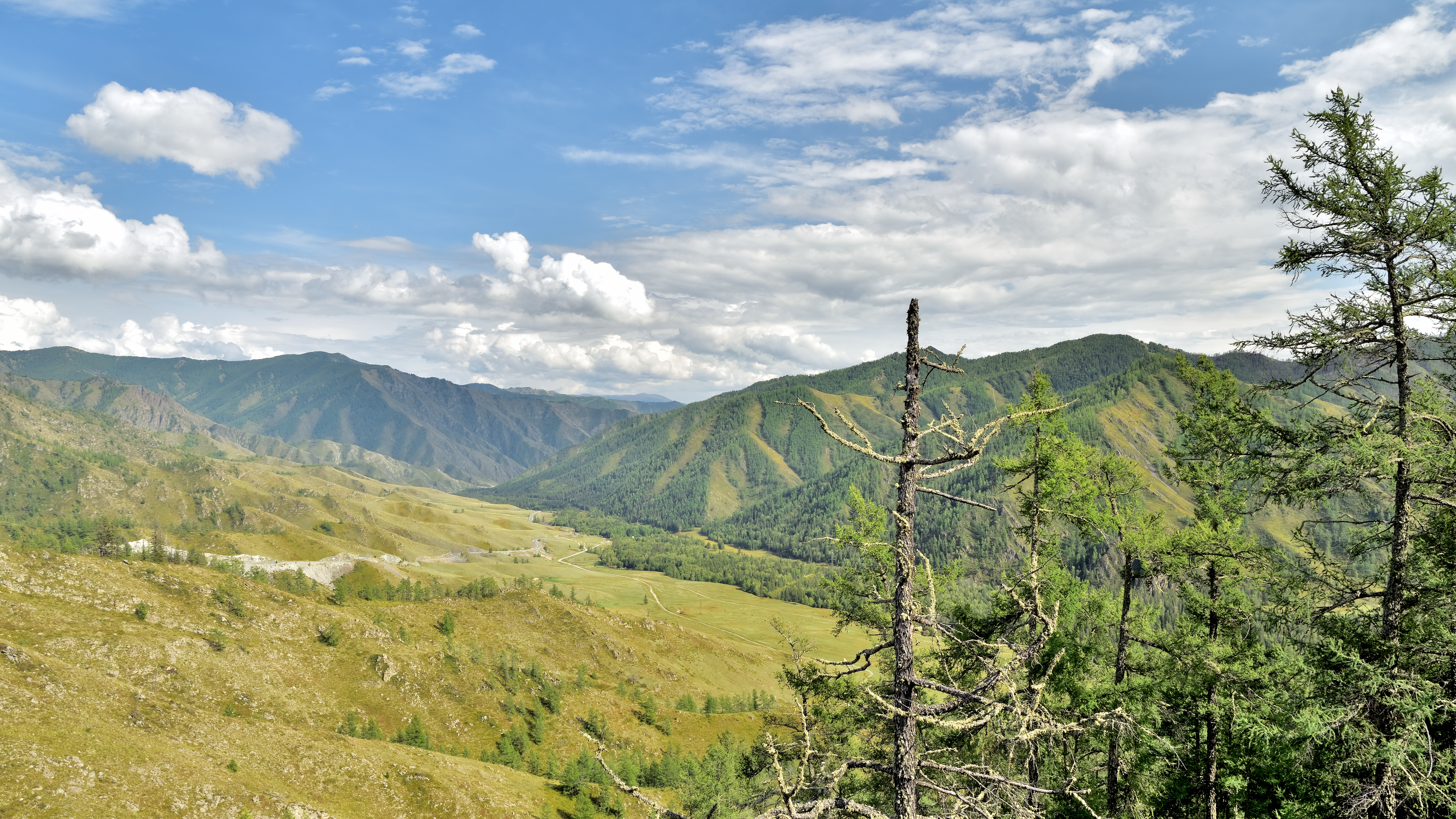
Panorama from the Chike-Taman pass in the south direction

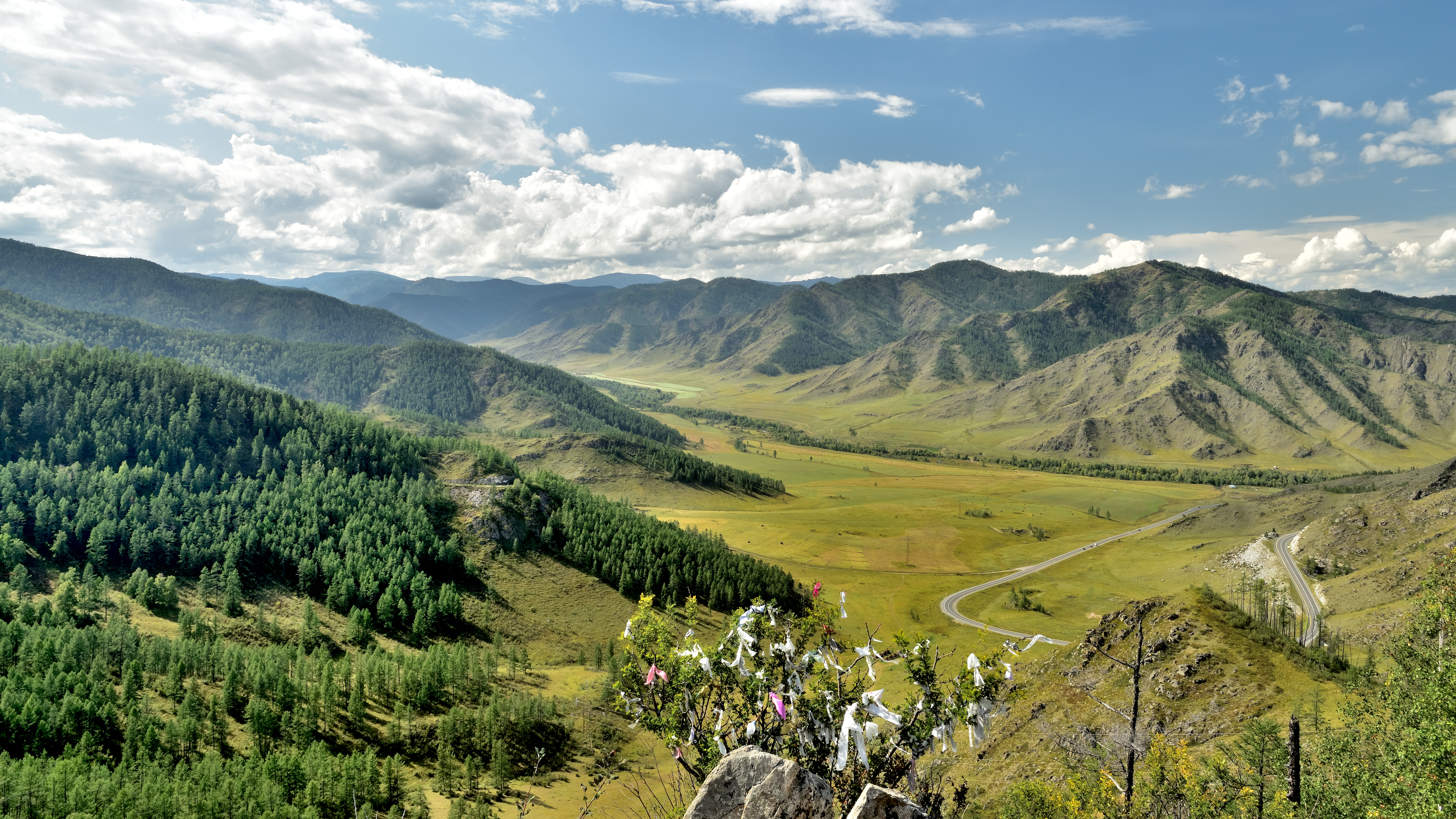
Panorama from the Chike-Taman pass in the north direction

=== Useful links ===
- Nationgeografic highway rating
- The Chuya highway sights
- The Chuya highway museum
