= Russian federal highways =

Russian federal highways M Motorway A Highway R Road (P in cyrillic) A Highway, under reconstruction

Typical Russian highway sign (M8)

R258

Russian federal highways (Russian: автомобильные дороги федерального значения Российской Федерации, romanized: avtomobil’nyye dorogi federal’nogo znacheniya Rossiyskoy Federatsii; lit. highways of federal importance of the Russian Federation) are the most important highways in Russia that are federal property. The following motorways are designated as federal.

- All highways
  - that connect Moscow with the capitals of the neighbouring countries and with the administrative centres of the subjects of the Russian Federation. They are identified by the prefix "M" in the national route signs;
  - that are parts of the international road networks: European and Asian, identified by prefixes "E" and "AH" in the international route signs used simultaneously with the national route signs.
- Some highways
  - that connect administrative centers of the subjects of the Russian Federation with each other (national route sign prefix "P," which is the Cyrillic "R")
  - that are branching and bridging roads (national prefix "A"):
    - access roads that lead to major transportation nodes and special objects
    - access roads from the administrative centers of the subjects of the Russian Federation which has no highway connection with Moscow to the nearest sea and river ports and to the international borders.
    - which interlink other federal highways.

The federal highways are classified in Russia into two categories:

- "motorways/Avtomagistral" (Russian: магистральная автомобильная дорога, автомагистраль), not the same as the English term motorway
- "other".

== Roads of regional and intermunicipal importance ==
The local importance roads in Russia are designated with a letter prefix and a number as well as the OKATO (Общероссийский классификатор объектов административно-территориального деления, Russian classification on objects of administrative division) code for the region.

These roads use the following prefixes:

- P: Highways of federal or regional significance connecting the administrative centers of the Russian Federation
- A: Highways that are branching and bridging roads:
  - access roads that lead to major transportation nodes and special objects
  - access roads from the administrative centers of the subjects of the Russian Federation which has no highway connection with Moscow to the nearest sea and river ports and to the international borders
  - which interlink other federal highways
- K: for other roads of regional importance
- N: for roads of intermunicipal significance

== Network map ==
Interactive map of highways of Russia

Some roads depicted here are in disputed territories outwith the Russian Federation

== Federal highways ==
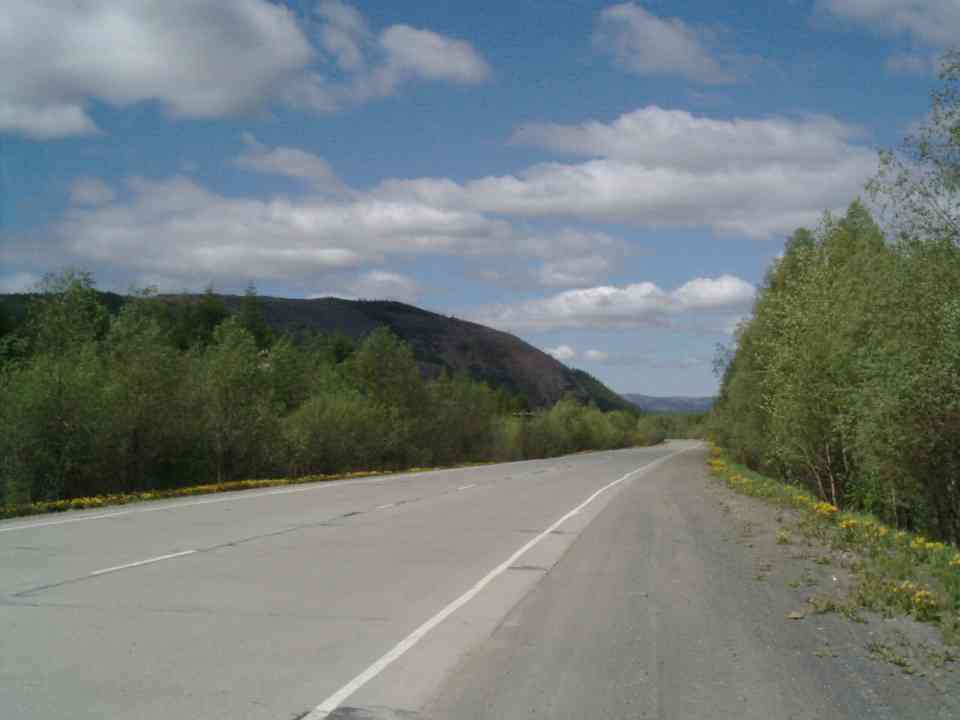
R504 "Kolyma"

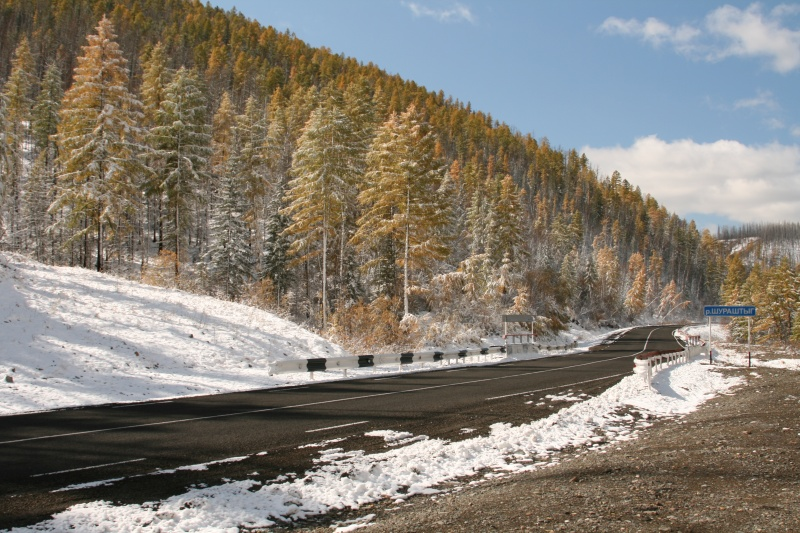
R257 "Yenisei"

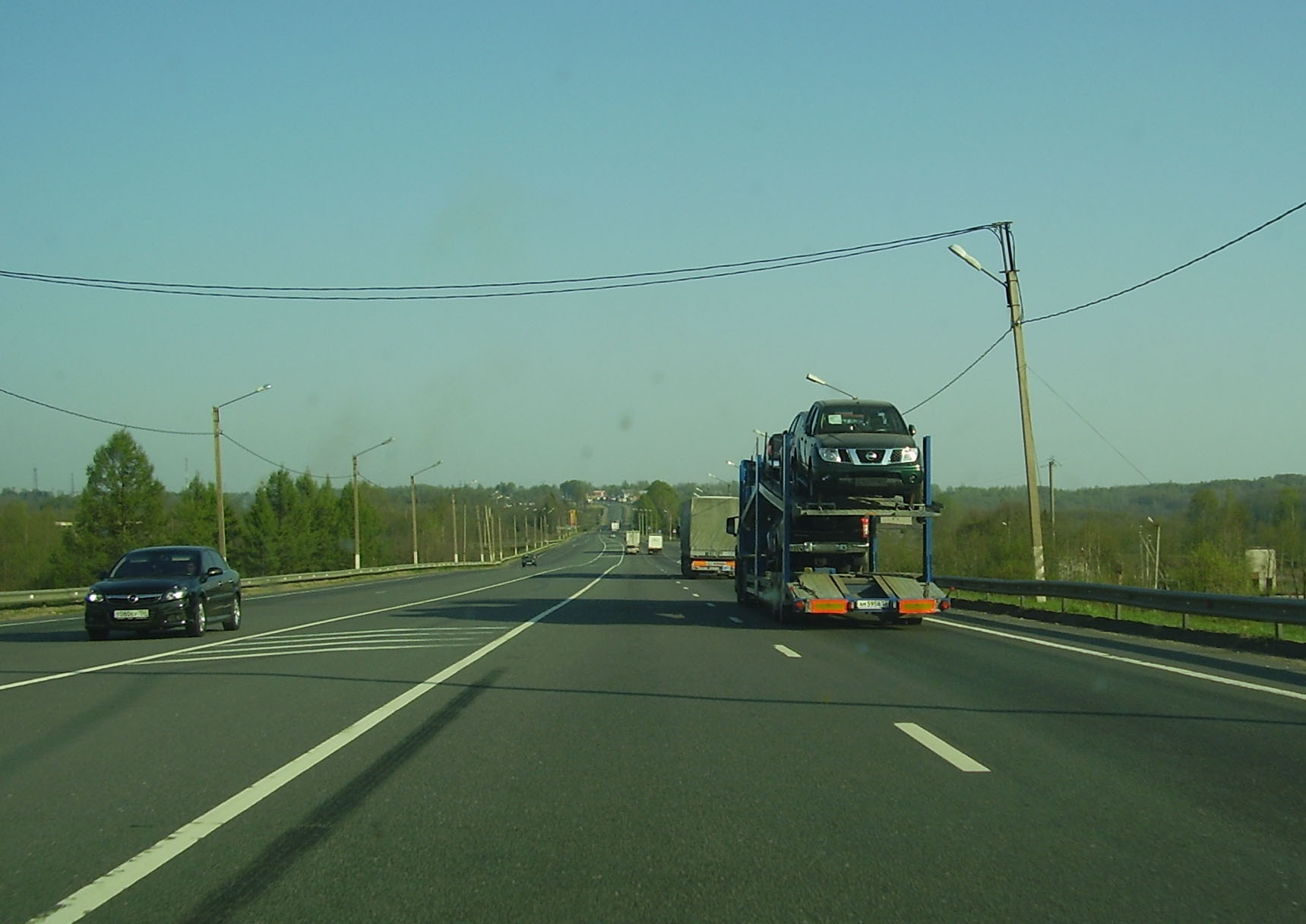
M10 "Rossiya"

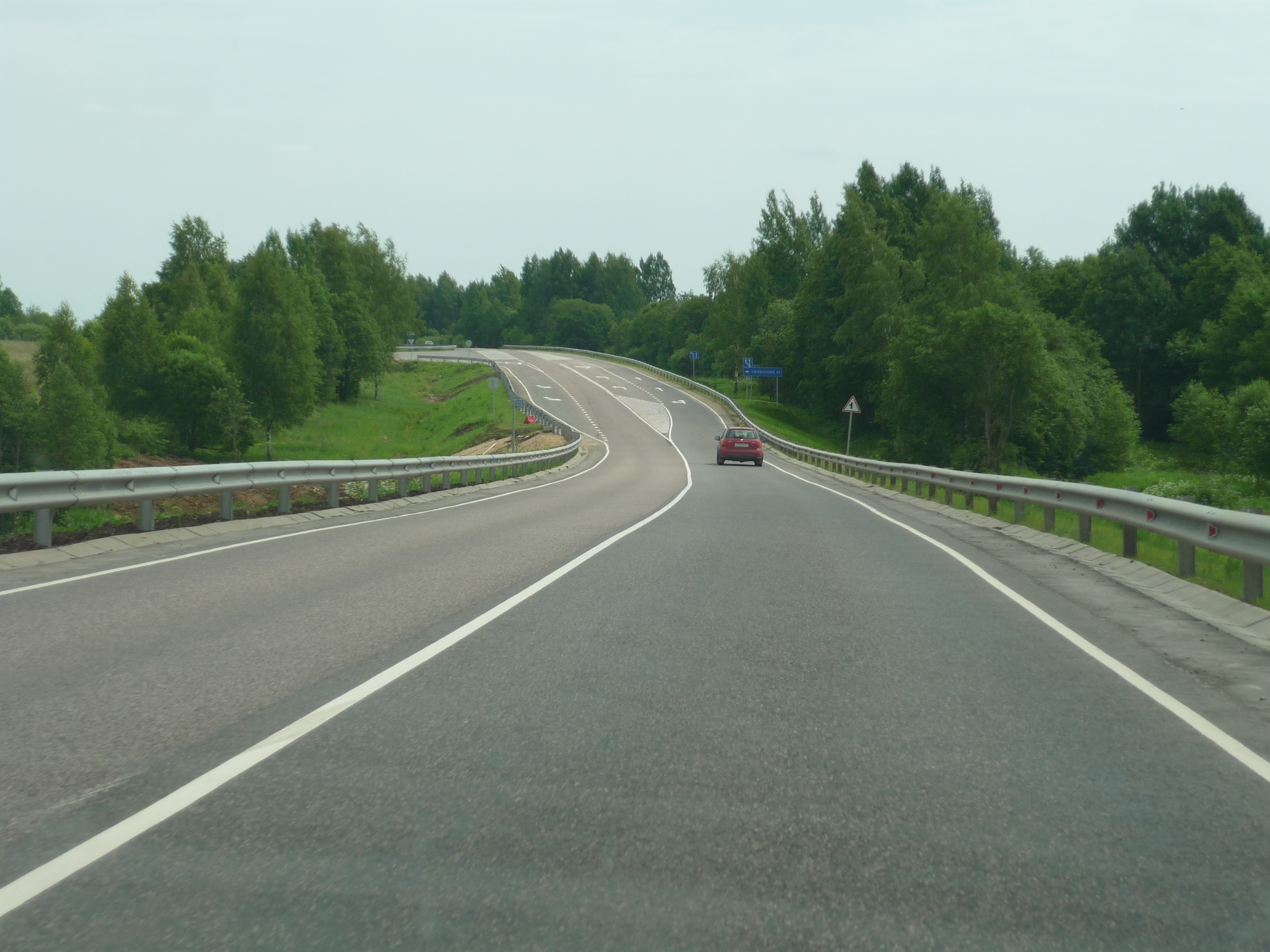
M9 "Baltiya"

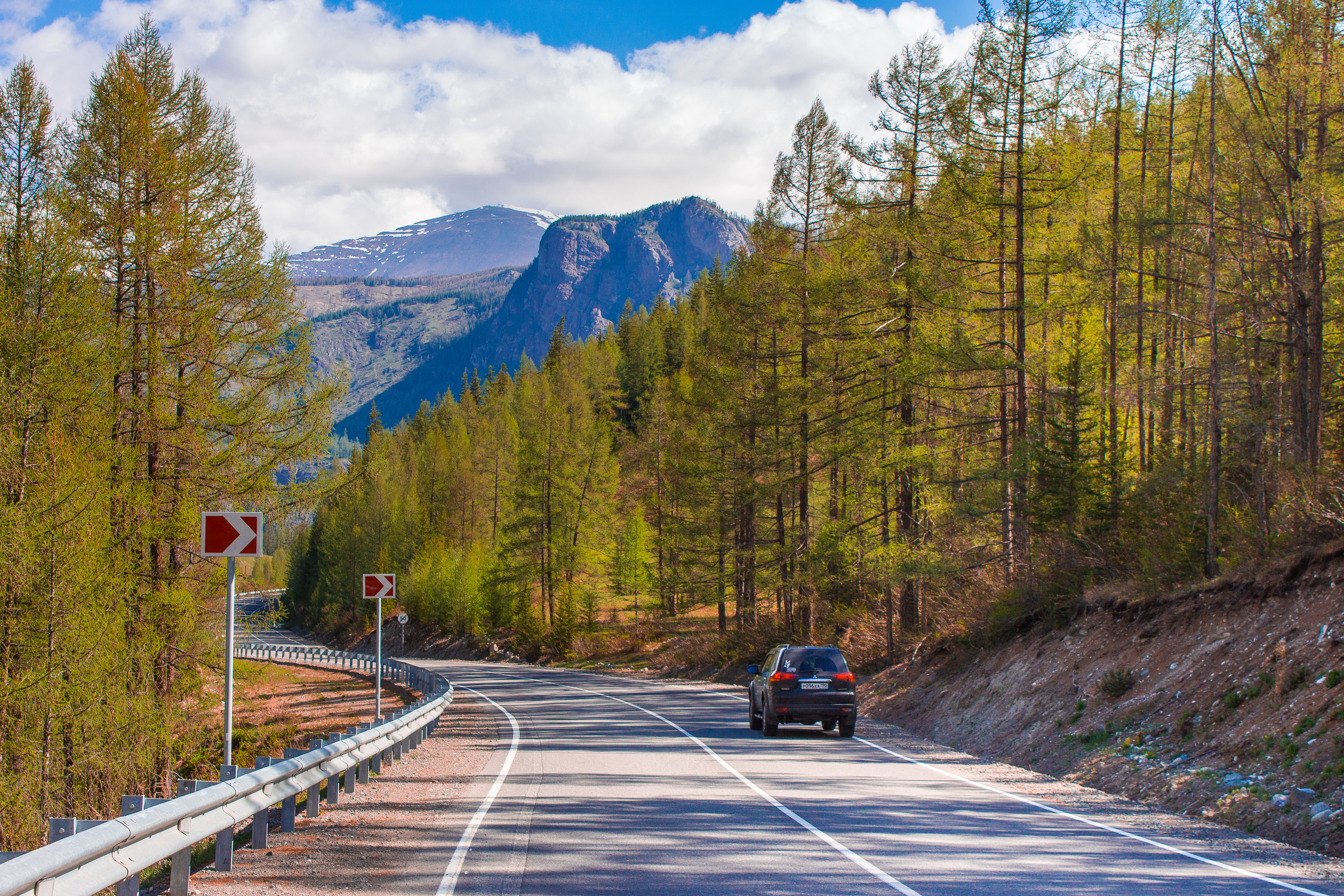
R256 highway

Highway	Route	Length	Notes
M1	Moscow - Belarusian border	440 km (270 mi)	
M2	Moscow - Tula - Orel - Kursk - Belgorod - Ukrainian border	720 km (450 mi)	
M3	Moscow - Kaluga - Bryansk - Ukrainian border	490 km (300 mi)	
M4	Moscow - Voronezh - Rostov-on-Don - Krasnodar - Novorossiysk	1,513 km (940 mi)	One of three fully-fledged nationwide motorways in Russia alongside M11 and M12 (all three are toll roads)
M5	Moscow - Ryazan’ - Penza - Samara - Ufa - Chelyabinsk	1,819 km (1,130 mi)	
M7	Moscow - Vladimir - Nizhny Novgorod - Kazan	1,342 km (834 mi)	Originally continued to Ufa; this is planned to become portions of M12, R240 and R243
M8	Moscow - Yaroslavl - Vologda - Arkangelsk	1,271 km (790 mi)	
M9	Moscow - Volokolamsk - Latvian border	610 km (380 mi)	
M10	Moscow - Tver’ - Velikiy Novgorod - Saint Petersburg	872 km (542 mi)	Originally continued to Finnish border, but this was redesignated A181 in 2018
M11	Moscow – Saint Petersburg	684 km (425 mi)	One of three fully-fledged nationwide motorways in Russia alongside M4 and M12 (all three are toll roads)
M12	Moscow - Nizhny Novgorod - Kazan - Yekaterinburg - Tyumen	811 km (504 mi) (currently in operation), ~1,600 km (990 mi) (proposed)	As of 2024, the 811 km (504 mi) stretch of M12 between Moscow and Kazan has been completed and put to operation; the rest of the motorway is under construction
R21	Saint Petersburg - Petrozavodsk - Murmansk - Pechenga - Norwegian border	2,038 km (1,266 mi)	Former M18
R22	Highway M4 - Tambov - Volgograd - Astrakhan	1,779 km (1,105 mi)	Former M6
R23	Saint Petersburg - Pskov - Pustoshka - Nevel - Belarusian border	544 km (338 mi)	Former M20
R56	Veliky Novgorod - Soltsy - Porkhov - Pskov	223 km (139 mi)	Former A116
R92	Kaluga - Peremyshl’ - Belev - Orel	181 km (112 mi)	
R119	Orel - Livny - Elets - Lipetsk - Tambov	390 km (240 mi)	
R120	Orel - Bryansk - Smolensk - Belarusian border	510 km (320 mi)	Former A141
R132	Yaroslavl - Kostroma - Ivanovo - Vladimir - Gus-Khrustalny - Ryazan - Mikhailov - Tula - Kaluga - Vyazma - Rzhev - Tver - Uglich - Yaroslavl	1,558 km (968 mi)	Bypass for M3; Russia's longest ring road
R158	Nizhny Novgorod - Saransk - Issa - Penza - Saratov		
R176	Cheboksary - Yoshkar-Ola - Kirov - Syktyvkar		Former A119
R177	Nizhny Novgorod - Yoshkar-Ola		
R178	Saransk - Surskoye - Ulyanovsk		Continues to Samara as 73R-178 and 36P-170
R193	Voronezh - Tambov		
R207	Penza - Balashov - Mikhailovka to route R260		
R208	Tambov - Penza		
R215	Astrakhan - Kochubey - Kizlyar - Makhachkala		
R216	Astrakhan - Elista - Stavropol		Former A154
R217	Route M4 "Don" - Vladikavkaz - Grozny - Makhachkala - Azerbaijani border		Former M29
R228	Syzran - Saratov - Volgograd		
R229	Samara - Pugachev - Engels - Volgograd		
R239	Kazan - Orenburg - Akbulak - Kazakh border		
	Ufa - Orenburg		
R241	Kazan - Buinsk - Ulyanovsk		
R243	Kostroma - Sharya - Kirov - Perm		
R254	Chelyabinsk - Kurgan - Omsk - Novosibirsk		Former M51
R255	Novosibirsk - Kemerovo - Krasnoyarsk - Irkutsk		Former M53
R256	Novosibirsk - Barnaul - Gorno-Altaysk - Mongolian border		Former M52
R257	Krasnoyarsk - Abakan - Kyzyl - Chadan - Khandagayty - Mongolian border		Former M54
R258	Irkutsk - Ulan-Ude - Chita		Former M55
R260	Volgograd - Kamensk-Shakhtinsky - Luhansk		Former M21 and A260; runs through occupied Ukraine
R280	Rostov-on-Don - Mariupol - Melitopol - Simferopol		Runs through occupied Ukraine
R297	Chita - Never - Svobodnyy - Arkhara - Birobidzhan - Khabarovsk		Former M58
R298	Kursk - Voronezh to route R22		Former A144
R354	Yekaterinburg - Shadrinsk - Kurgan		
R402	Tyumen - Yalutorovsk - Ishim - Omsk		
R404	Tyumen - Tobol’sk - Khanty-Mansiysk		
R504	Yakutsk - Magadan		Former M56 "Kolyma"
A103	Moscow - Shchëlkovo to route A107		
A104	Moscow - Dmitrov - Dubna		
A105	access road from Domodedovo Airport		Former portion of route M4
A106	Moscow-Zvenigorod		Former A105
A107	Iksha - Noginsk - Bronnitsy - Golitsyno - Istra - Iksha		
A108	Dmitrov - Sergiev Posad - Orekhovo-Zuevo – Voskresensk - Mikhnevo - Balabanovo - Ruza - Klin - Dmitrov		
A109	Krasnogorsk - Petrovo-Dalnee; connection to route A106 and entrance to state dacha No. 7 (in Petrovo-Dalnee)		
A110	access road from highway A108 to the "Semonovskoye" facility		
A111	access road from route M10 to the state complex "Zavidovo"		
A112	Chepelëvo - Velyaminovo		
A113	Circular roadway in Moscow Oblast and Moscow		
A114	Vologda - Tikhvin to highway R21		
A118	Beltway around Saint Petersburg		
A119	Vologda - Medvezhyegorsk to highway R21		Former R5
A120	Kirovsk - Mga - Gatchina - Bol’shaya Izhora		
A121	Saint Petersburg - Sortavala to route R21		Former A129
A122	Route A114 – Ustyuzhna - Kresttsy - Yazhelbitsy - Velikiye Luki - Nevel		One portion former M10
A123	Chekshino - Totma - Kotlas - Kuratovo		
A130	Moscow - Maloyaroslavets - Roslavl - Belarusian border		Former A101
A132	access road from highway M1 to Smolensk		
A133	access road from highway M4 to Lipetsk		
A134	access road from route M4 to Voronezh		
A135	access road from route M4 to Rostov-on-Don		
A136	access road from route M4 to Krasnodar		
A137	Route R21 - Tiksha - Ledmozero - Kostomuksha - Finnish border		
A142	Trosna - Kalinovka		
A146	Krasnodar - Verkhnebakansky		
A147	Dzhubga - Sochi - Abkhaz/Georgian border		Former M27
A148	Route A147 to the Sochi bypass		
A149	Adler - Krasnaya Polyana		Former A148
A151	Tsivilsk - Ulyanovsk		
A154	Urvan - Verkhnyaya Balkariya - Ushtulu		Former R291
A155	Cherkessk - Dombay - Abkhaz/Georgian border		
A156	Access roads from A155 to international holiday resort "Arkhyz" and the specialized Astrophysical Observatory of the Russian Academy of Sciences		Former portion of A155
A157	Mineralnye Vody Airport - Kislovodsk		
A158	Prokhladnyy - Baksan - Elbrus		One section former R289
A159	access road from Maikop to the Caucasian State Biosphere Reserve		Former R254
A160	Maikop - Bzhedugkhabl - Adygeysk - Ust-Labinsk - Korenovsk		Former R253
A161	Vladikavkaz - Nizhniy Lars - Georgian border		Former R301
A162	Vladikavkaz - Alagir		Former R297
A163	access road from highway R217 to Vladikavkaz Airport		
A164	Kardzhin - Alagir - Nizhniy Zaramag - South Ossetian/Georgian border		Former R297 and R298
A165	Lermontov - Cherkessk		Former A156
A167	Kochubey - Neftekumsk - Zelenokumsk - Mineralnye Vody		Former R263 and R285
A180	Saint Petersburg - Estonian border		Former M11
A181	Saint Petersburg - Vyborg - Finnish border		Former portion of M10
A212	Pskov - Izborsk - Estonian border		
A215	Lodeynoe Pole - Vytegra - Prokshino - Plesetsk - Brin-Navolok		Former R37
A216	Gvardeisk - Neman - Lithuanian border		
A217	Kaliningrad - Svetlogorsk		Primorsk Half Ring Road
A229	Kaliningrad - Chernyakhovsk - Nesterov - Lithuanian border		
A240	Bryansk - Novozybkov - Belarusian border		Former M13
A258	Highway M4 - Kantermirovka - Luhansk		
A270	Route M4 - Novoshakhtinsk - LPR/Ukrainian border		Former M19
A289	Krasnodar - Slavyansk-on-Kuban - Temryuk to route A290		Former 03K-579
A290	Novorossiysk - Kerch, entrances to Port Kavkaz and Anapa Airport		Former M25; runs through occupied Ukraine
A291	Kerch - Simferopol - Sevastopol		Former 35P-001, 35P-003 and 35N-113; runs through occupied Ukraine
A295	Yoshkar-Ola - Zelenodolsk to route M7		Former R175
A298	Route R208 - Saratov - Pristannoe - Ershov - Ozinki - Kazakh border		
A300	Samara - Bolshaya Chernigovka - Kazakh border		Former M32
A305	Orenburg - Ilek - Kazakh border		Former R335
A310	Chelyabinsk - Troitsk - Kazakh border		Former M36
A320	Omsk - Cherlak - Kazakh border		Former M38
A321	Barnaul - Pavlovsk - Kazakh border		
A322	Barnaul - Rubtsovsk - Kazakh border		Former A349
A331	Tulun - Bratsk - Ust’-Kut - Mirnyy - Yakutsk		Former R419
A333	Kultuk - Mondy - Mongolian border		Former A164
A340	Ulan-Ude - Kyakhta - Mongolian border		Former A165
A350	Chita - Zabaykalsk - Chinese border		Former A166
A360	Never - Yakutsk		Former M56 "Lena"
A361	Route A360 - Chinese border		
A370	Khabarovsk - Vladivostok		Former M60
A371	Vladivostok - Ostrov		
A375	Khabarovsk - Krasnyy Yar - Ariadnoe - Chuguevka - Nakhodka		
A376	Khabarovsk - Lidoga - Vanino - Komsomolsk-on-Amur		Former 08A-1
A384	access road from Anadyr to Anadyr Airport (Ugolny)		
A391	Yuzhno-Sakhalinsk - Korsakov		Former R488
A392	Yuzhno-Sakhalinsk - Kholmsk		Former R495
A393	Yuzhno-Sakhalinsk - Okha		Former R495
日本語版	Kurilsk - Burevestnik ( Shana - Tennei )		This area is a disputed territory with Japan
A401	access road from the Port of Petropavlovsk-Kamchatskiy to Elisovo Airport		

=== Former routes ===
- R-1: Brin-Navolok - Mirnyy - Kargopol' - Pesok - Prokshino; downgraded to 11P-001
- R-5: Vologda - Vitegra - Pudozh - Medvezhyegorsk, redesignated as A119
- R-10: Pechenga to the border with Norway; became a portion of M18 (now R21) in 2003
- R-12 "Lotta": Murmansk to the border with Finland; downgraded to 47A-059 in 2018
- R-35: Saint Petersburg - Keikino; downgraded to 41K-008
- R-37 "Lodeynoye Pole - Brin-Navolok": Lodeynoye Pole - Vytegra; upgraded to A215 in 2018
- R-124: Shatsk - Sasovo - Pitelino - Kasimov; downgraded to 61K-012
- 1R-175: Yoshkar-Ola - Zelenodolsk to route M7; redesignated as A295 in 2018
- 1R-209: Kirsanov - Penza; became a portion of R208
- R-216: Astrakhan - Liman; became a portion of R215
- R-242: Perm - Yekaterinburg; split into portions of R243 and M12
- R-253: Maikop - Labinsk - Korenovsk; redesignated as A160
- R-254: Maikop - Guzeripl’ - Caucasian state Biosphere Reserve; redesignated as A159
- R-263: Neftekumsk - Zelenokumsk - Mineral’nye Vody; became a portion of A167
- R-285: Kochubey - Neftekumsk; became a portion of A167
- R-289: Prokhladnyy - Baksan; became a portion of A158 in 2018
- R-291: Kizlyar - Makhachkala; became a portion of R215
- R-291: Route M29 - Verkhnyaya Balkariya - Ushtulu; redesignated A154
- R-297: Alagir - Nizhniy Zaramag - South Ossetia; became a portion of A164 in 2018
- R-297: Vladikavkaz - Alagir; redesignated as A162
- R-298: Kardzhin - Alagir; became a portion of A164 in 2018
- R-301: Vladikavkaz - Nizhniy Lars to the border with Georgia, redesignated A161 in 2017
- R-314: Ufa - Orenburg (including Ufa bypass); redesignated R240 in 2010
- 1R-335: Orenburg - Ilek to the border with Kazakhstan (on to Uralsk); redesignated A305 in 2018
- 1R-344: Nyvta - Kudymkar, redesignated A153 in 2018
- R-351: Yekaterinburg - Tyumen; became a portion of M12 in 2023
- R-409 "Yeniseyskiy trakt": Krasnoyarsk - Eniseisk; downgraded to 04K-044
- R-418: Irkutsk - Ust-Ordynskiy; redesignated as A332
- R-419: Route M53 - Bratsk - Ust’-Kut - Mirnyy - Yakutsk; redesignated A331 in 2007
- R-436: Ulan-Ude - Romanivka - Chita; downgraded to 81P-002 and 76A-138
- R-447: Nakhodka - Lazo - Kavalerovo; downgraded to 05N-131; later upgraded to A375
- R-454: Khabarovsk - Komsomolsk-on-Amur; downgraded to 08A-1; upgraded to A376 in 2018
- 1R-488: Yuzhno-Sakhalinsk - Korsakov; redesignated A391 in 2018
- R-495: Yuzhno-Sakhalinsk - Kholmsk; redesignated A392
- R-600: Kostroma - Ivanovo, designation cancelled in 2020
- A-100 "Mozhayskoe Road": Moscow to route R90
- A-102: Moscow - Lyubertsy - Zhukovsky - Ramenskoye
- A-113: Kostroma - Ivanovo; redesignated as R600
- A-115: Route M10 to Novaya Ladoga; downgraded to 49K-05
- A-117: Opochka to the border with Belarus; downgraded to 58K-284
- A-122 "Vyborg Highway": Pargolovo - Ogonki; downgraded to 41A-180 in 2020
- A-128: Saint Petersburg - Vsevolozhsk - Mor'ye; downgraded to 41K-064
- A-131: Access roads from route A130 to "Arkhangelsk" holiday resort, "Voskresenskoe" household plot and "Desna" sanatorium and holiday resort; designation cancelled in 2013 and transferred to state ownership
- A-138: Murmansk - Sputnik - Pechenga, became a portion of M18 (now R21) in 2003
- A-141: Bryansk - Smolensk to the border with Belarus (on to Rudnev, Vitebsk); entrance to the city of Smolensk; now part of R120
- A-143: Tambov - Morshansk - Shatsk
- A-144: Kursk - Voronezh - Borisoglebsk to route M6; redesignated as R298 and R22 in 2018
- A-148: Route M27 to Krasnaya Polyana; redesignated as A149
- A-153: Nytva - Kudymkar; former R344, absorbed into the R243 in 2023
- A-154: Astrakhan - Elista - Stavropol; redesignated as R216 in 2018
- A-156: Lermontov - Cherkessk; redesignated as A165 in 2018
- A-164: Kultuk - Mondy to the border with Mongolia; redesignated as A333 in 2010
- A-165: Route R297 (Ulan-Ude) - Kyakhta to the border with Mongolia; redesignated as A340 in 2018
- A-166: Chita-Zabaikalsk to the border with the People's Republic of China; redesignated as A350 in 2018
- A-181: Route A370 – Rudnaya Pristan; redesignated as 05N-100 in 2018
- A-182: Route A370 - Khorol' - Kamen'-Rybolov - Turiy Rog
- A-183: Route A370 - Yaroslavsky - Zharikovo - Kommissarovo
- A-184: Ussuriysk - Galenki - Lipovtsy to the border with the People's Republic of China
- A-188: Uglovoye - Artem - Fokino - Nakhodka
- A-189: Route A370 - Razdolnoe - Barabash - Kraskino - Hasan, border crossing into North Korea
- A-260: Volgograd - Kamensk-Shakhtinskiy to the border with LPR/Ukraine; former M21, upgraded to R260 in 2023
- A-280: Rostov-on-Don - Taganrog to the border with DPR/Ukraine; former M23, designation cancelled in 2023
- A-332: Irkutsk - Ust-Ordynskiy; former 1R-418, designation cancelled in 2012
- A-349: Barnaul - Rubtsovsk to the border with Kazakhstan (on to Semipalatinsk); redesignated as A322
- A-381: Naryan-Mar - Naryan-Mar Airport; designation cancelled in 2022
- A-382: Dudinka - Norilsk (Alykel Airport); designation cancelled in 2019
- A-383: Tura - Tura Airport (Gornyy); designation cancelled in 2019
- A-385: Ust'-Palana - Palana Airport; designation cancelled in 2011 and transferred to state ownership

== Regional routes ==
Cyrillic Р is used on signs.

- R-2: Dolmatovo - Nyandoma - Kargopol'
- R-6: Cherepovets - Belozyorsk - Lipin Bor
- R-7: Chekshino - Tot'ma - Nikolsk
- R-8: Ustyuzhna - Valdai
- R-15:
- R-16:
- R-17:
- R-18: Byelomorsk to route R21 "Kola"
- R-19: Petrozavodsk - Voznesen'ye
- R-20: Route A17 - Dzhankoy to the border with Ukraine
- R-25: Syktyvkar - Yemva - Ukhta
- R-26:
- R-27:
- R-28:
- R-33:
- R-34:
- R-36:
- R-38:
- R-39:
- R-40:
- R-41:
- R-42:
- R-47:
- R-48:
- R-49:
- R-50:
- R-51:
- R-52:
- R-53:
- R-57:
- R-58:
- R-59:
- R-60:
- R-61:
- R-62:
- R-63:
- R-68:
- R-71:
- R-72: Vladimir - Murom - Arzamas
- R-73:
- R-74:
- R-75:
- R-76:
- R-79:
- R-80:
- R-81: Kineshma - Elnat - Yuryevets - Puchezh - Tchkalovsk
- R-84: Tver - Bezhetsk - Krasnyy Kholm - Vesegonsk - Ustyuzhna
- R-85: Vishny Volochek - Maksatikha - Bezhetsk - Sonkovo
- R-87: Rzhev - Selizharovo - Ostashkov
- P-88:
- R-89: Ostashkov - Volgoverkhovye
- P-90: Route M1 "Belarus" - Tver
- R-93: Medyn - Kondrovo - Kaluga
- P-94:
- P-95:
- P-96:
- R-98: Kostroma - Sudislavl' - Makar'yev - Manturovo - Georgiyevskoye - Verkhnespasskoye
- P-99:
- R-100: Sudislavl - Galich - Chuhloma - Soligalich
- R-101:
- R-104: Sergiev Posad - Kalyazin - Uglich - Myshkin - Poshekhon'ye - Rybinsk - Cherepovets
- R-105 "Kasimovskoye Highway": Moscow - Kasimovo
- R-106:
- R-107:
- R-108:
- R-109:
- R-110 "Fryanovskoe Highway": Schelkovo - Fryanovo
- R-111 "Pyatnitskoye Highway": Moscow - Solnechogorsk
- R-112: Dmitrov - Taldom - Tempi
- R-113 "Rogachev Highway": Krasnaya Gorka - Lobnya - Kamenka - Fedorovka - Rogachevo
- R-114:
- R-115:
- R-116:
- R-123:
- R-125: Nizhny Novgorod - Ryazhsk
- R-126:
- R-127:
- R-130:
- R-133:
- R-134: Smolensk - Vyaz'ma - Zubtsov
- R-135:
- R-136:
- R-137:
- R-139: Belyov - Odoyev - Tula
- R-140:
- R-141:
- R-142:
- R-143:
- R-144:
- R-145:
- R-146:
- R-147:
- R-148:
- R-151: Yaroslavl - Rybinsk
- R-152: Rostov - Ivanovo - Shuya - Nizhny Novgorod
- R-156: Nizhny Novgorod, Arzamas-Saransk
- R-157: Uren - Shar'ya - Nikolsk - Veliky Ustyug - Kotlas
- R-159: Nizhny Novgorod - Krasnyye Baki - Shakhun'ya - Yaransk
- R-160:
- R-161:
- R-162: Rabotki - Poretskoe
- R-166:
- R-167:
- R-168:
- R-169:
- R-172:
- R-173:
- R-174:
- R-179:
- R-180: Saransk to route M5
- R-185:
- R-186:
- R-187:
- R-188: Stary Oskol - New Oskol
- R-189:
- R-190:
- R-191:
- R-194: Route A144 to Ostrogozhsk - Rossosh - Kantemirovka
- R-195:
- R-196: Route R194 to Podgorensky to route M4
- R-199:
- R-200: Ukrainian border near Gogolivka - Sudzha - Semenikhivka; extra unregistered portion from Semenikhivka to Kursk at European route E105 and European route E38
- R-203:
- R-204:
- R-205:
- R-214:
- R-219:
- R-220:
- R-221: Volgograd - Elista
- R-224: Samara - Busuluk - Orenburg
- R-225: Samara - Buguruslan
- R-226: Samara - Engels - Volzhskiy
- R-226: Samara - Saratov - Volgograd
- R-227: Syzran - Shigony - Usolye
- R-231:
- R-234:
- R-235:
- R-236:
- R-246: Bugul'ma - Buguruslan - Busuluk to the border with Kazakhstan
- R-262:
- R-264:
- R-265:
- R-301: Entrance to Vladikavkaz Airport
- R-316: Sterlitamak - Beloretsk - Magnitogorsk
- R-317: Birsk - Tastuba - Satka
- R-322: Izhevsk - Sarapul
- R-330: Shadrinsk to route P254 "Irytsh"
- R-336: Orenburg - Orsk
- R-337: Sara - Yuldybaevo
- R-352: Yekaterinburg - Nizhny Tagil - Serov
- R-355: Yekaterinburg - Polevskoy
- R-380: Novosibirsk - Kamen-na-Obi - Barnaul
- R-384: Novosibirsk - Zhuravlyovo - Leninsk-Kuznetsk - Kemerovo - Yurga
- R-384-1: Leninsk-Kuznetsk - Novokuznetsk
- R-400: Tomsk - Mariinsk
- R-401: Tyumen - Roshino Airport
- R-403:
- R-408:
- R-410:
- R-411:
- R-412:
- R-413:
- R-420:
- R-425:
- R-426:
- R-427:
- R-428:
- R-429:
- R-430:
- R-431:
- R-437: Romanovka - Bagdarin
- R-438 "Barguzinskiy trakt": Ulan-Ude - Kurumkan
- R-439:
- R-440 "Dzhidinskiy trakt": Gusinoozyorsk - Zakamensk
- R-441: Mukhorshibir - Bichura - Kyakhta
- R-442:
- R-448: Lazo - Preobrazheniye
- R-449: Route A370 to Lesozavodsk - Gornyye Klyuchi to route A370
- R-455: Birobidzhan - Leninskoye - Dezhnevo
- R-456: Birofeld - Amurzet
- R-461:
- R-463:
- R-464:
- R-465:
- R-466:
- R-467:
- R-468:
- R-469:
- R-474:
- R-475:
- R-481:
- R-482:
- R-487: Yuzhno-Sakhalinsk - Okha
- R-489:
- R-490:
- R-491:
- R-492:
- R-493:
- R-501:
- R-502:
- R-503:
- R-508:
- R-509:
- R-510:
- R-511:
- R-512:
- R-513:
- R-514:
- R-515:
- R-516:
- R-517:
- -: Yuzhno-Sakhalinsk, Kholmsk

Access roads to ports, airports and railroad stations from cities Petropavlovsk-Kamchatsky, Anadyr, Dudinka, Naryan-Mar, Salekhard, Khanty-Mansiysk and from the urban-type settlements of Palana and Tura.

=== Recent additions ===
- Ufa–Orenburg and the Ufa western bypass (published December 24, 2008, to be in force since January 1, 2010)
