= North-Western Chord =

Arterial road in Moscow, Russia

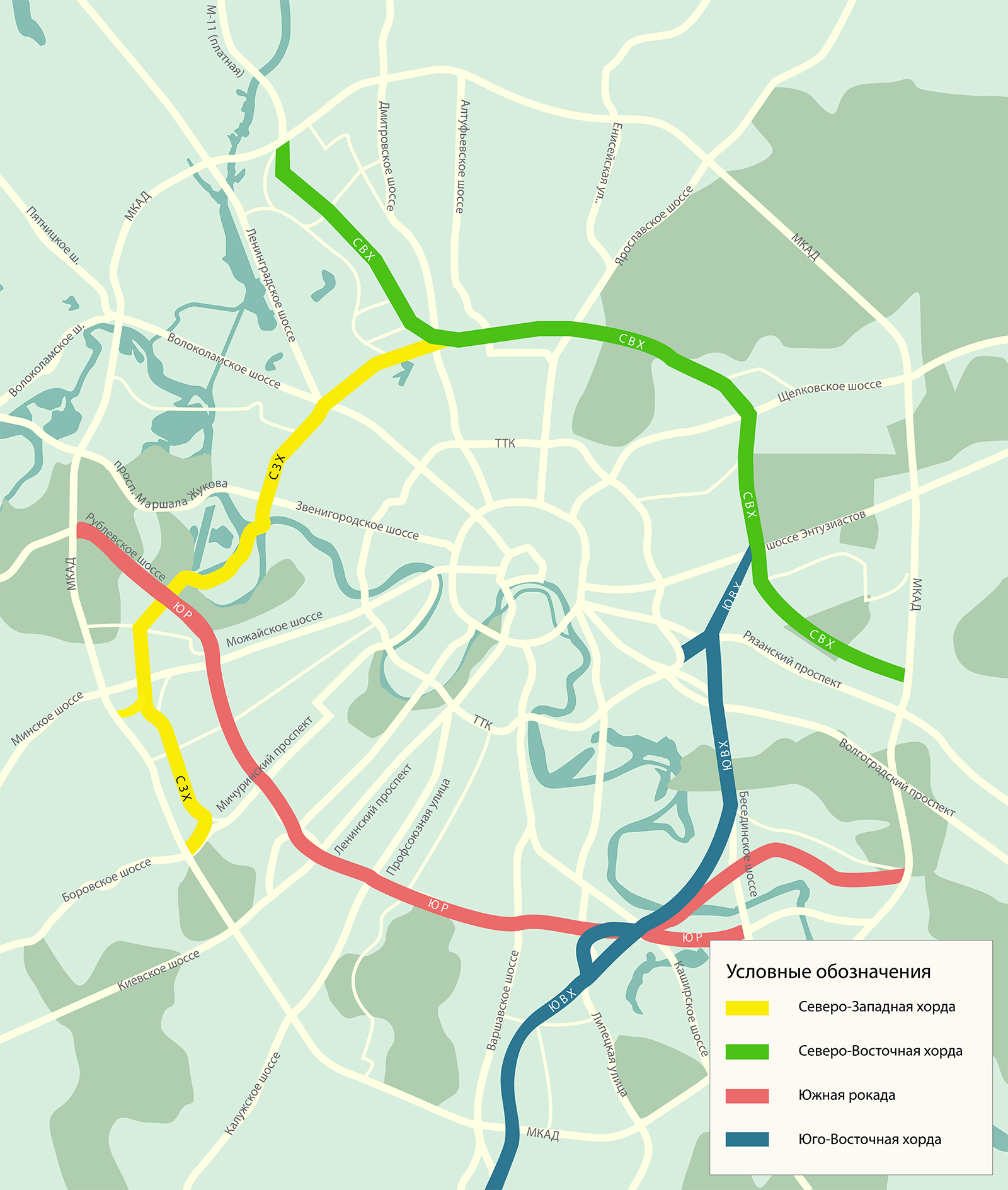
- North-Western Chord (yellow) is a part of Moscow Chord Ring

Route information
- Length: 30 km (19 mi)

Location
- Country: Russia

Highway system
- Russian Federal Highways

The North-Western Chord is an arterial road in Moscow which is a part of Moscow Chord Ring. Its length is about 30 km. It was fully opened on 29 November 2019, along with the opening of the New Karamyshevsky Bridge.

== Gallery ==
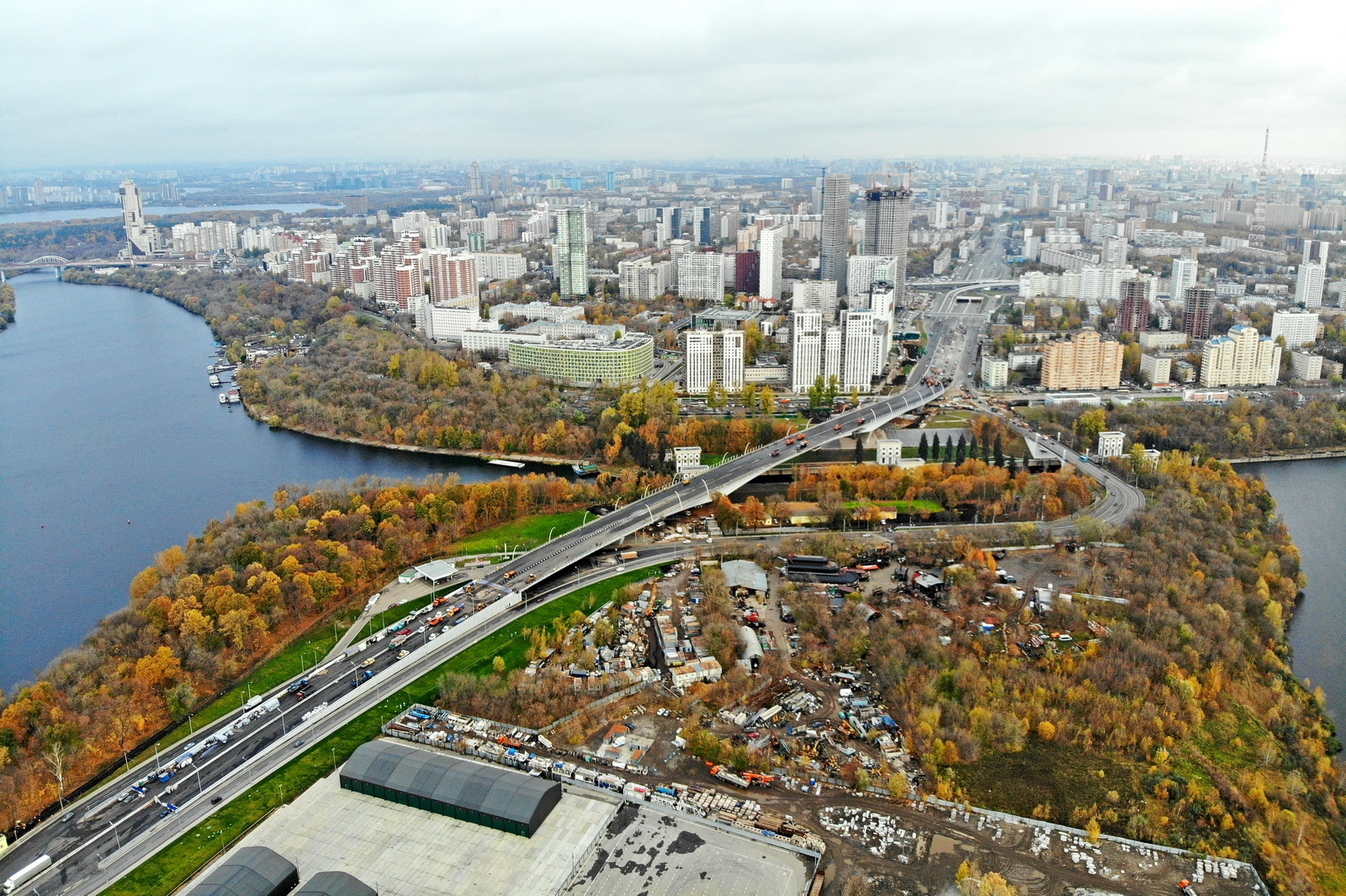
The New Karamyshevsky Bridge was the last unfinished section of the North-Western Chord and was opened in 2019.

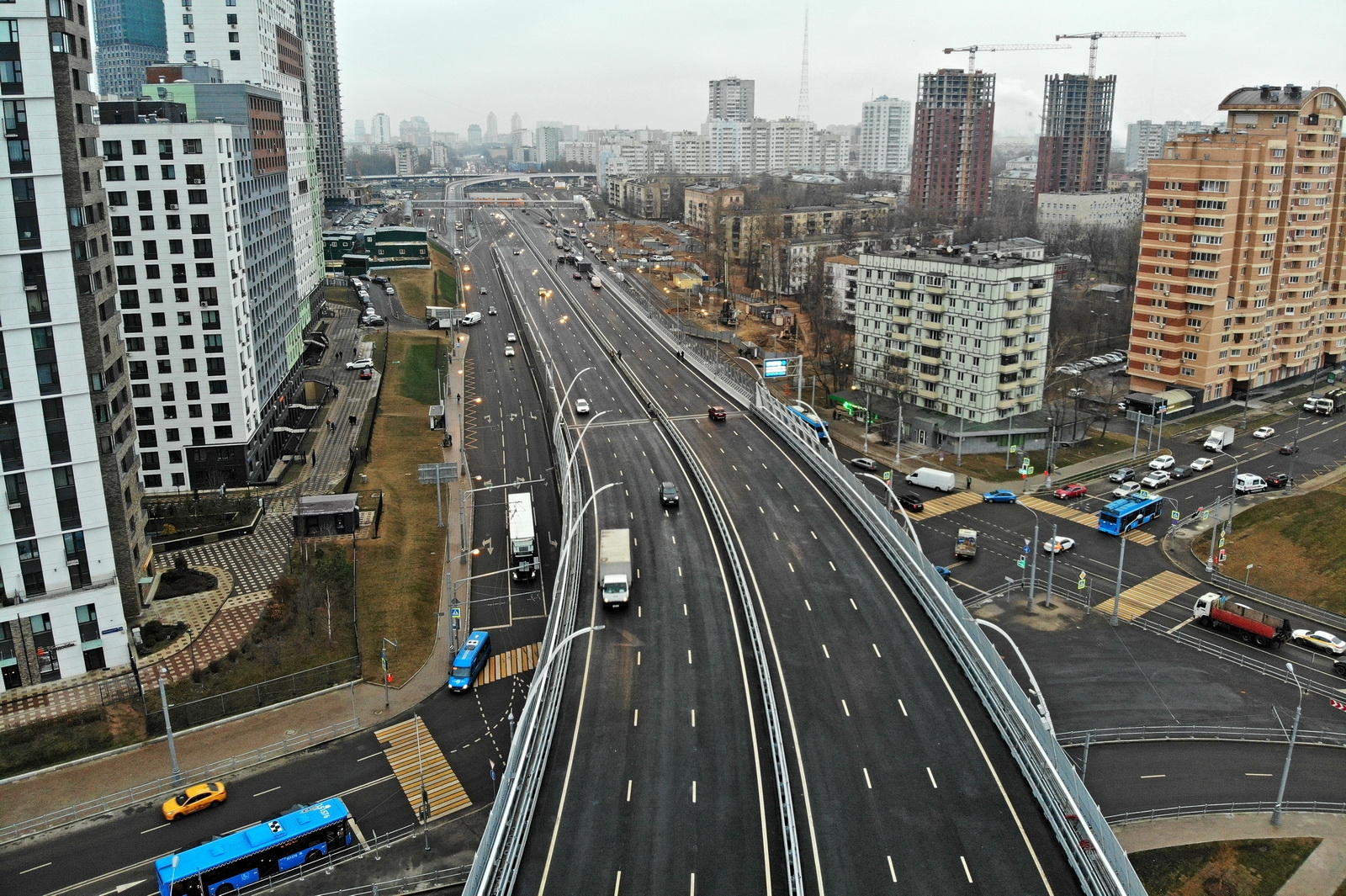
On the photo, Narodnogo Opolcheniya Street and Karamyshevskaya Embankment are in the lower level, beneath the North-Western Chord.

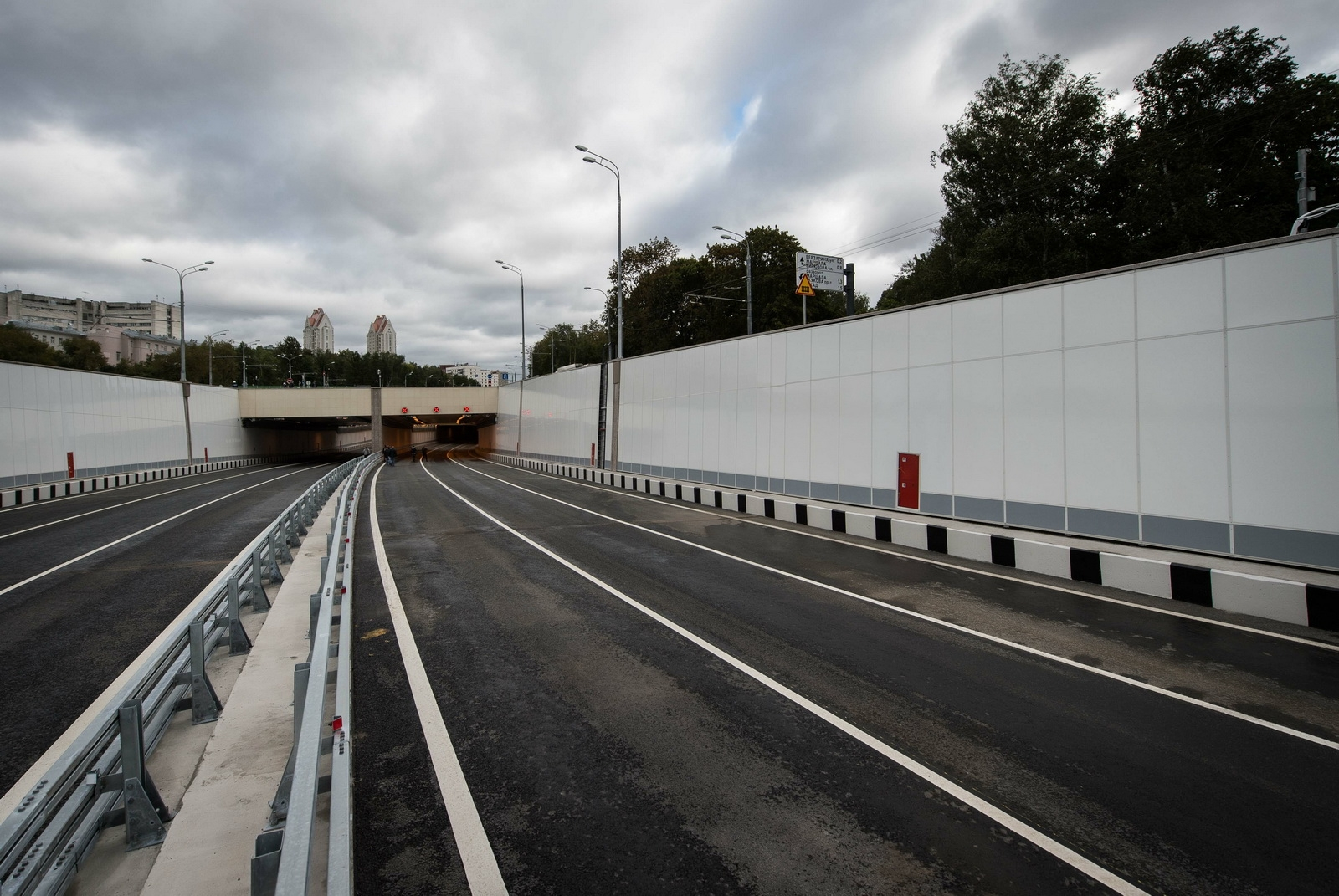
Moscow's first double-deck tunnel was opened in 2016 as part of the built section of the North-Western Chord.

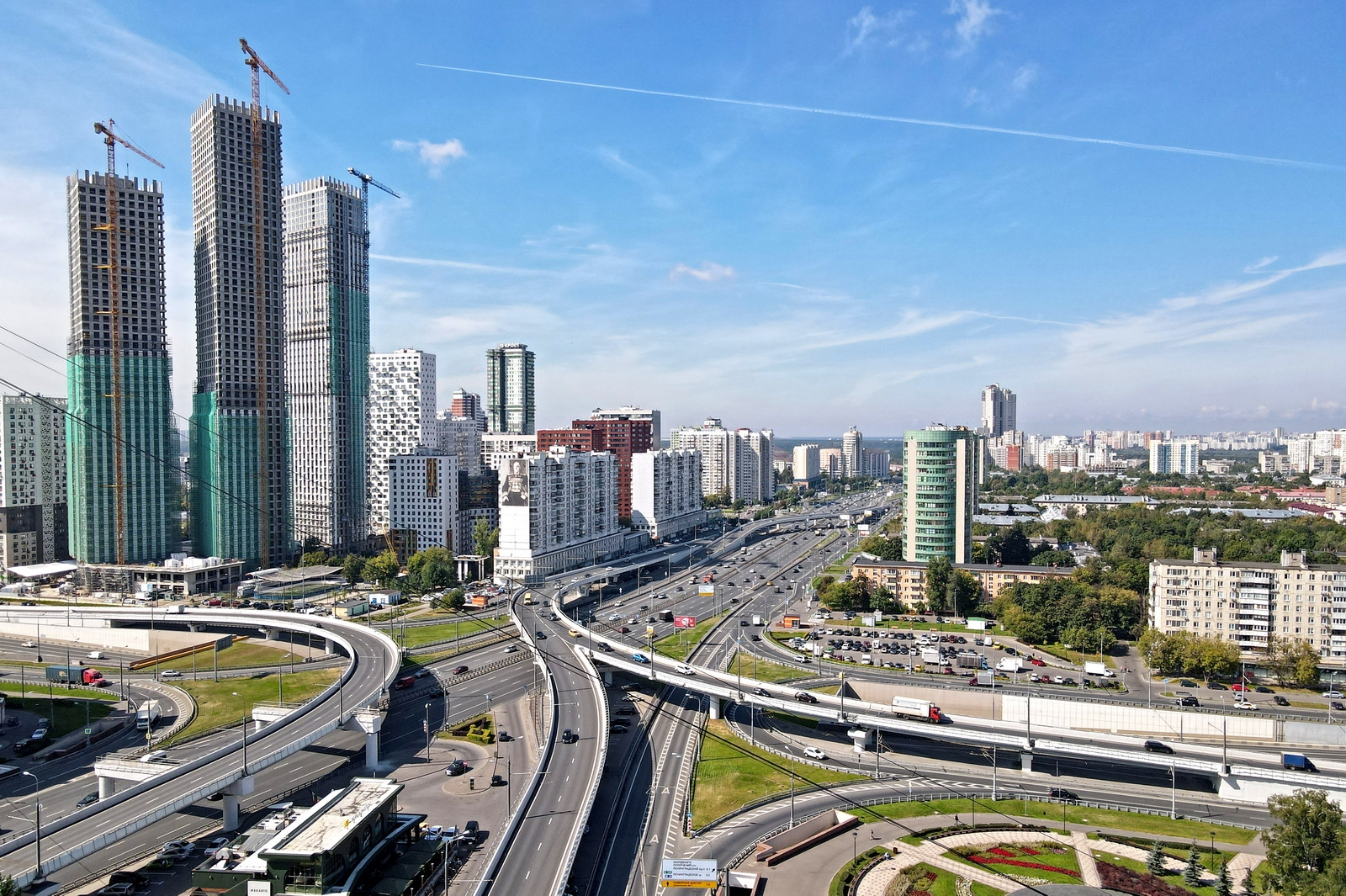
An interchange of Krasnopresnensky Prospekt and the North-Western Chord (passes through a tunnel).

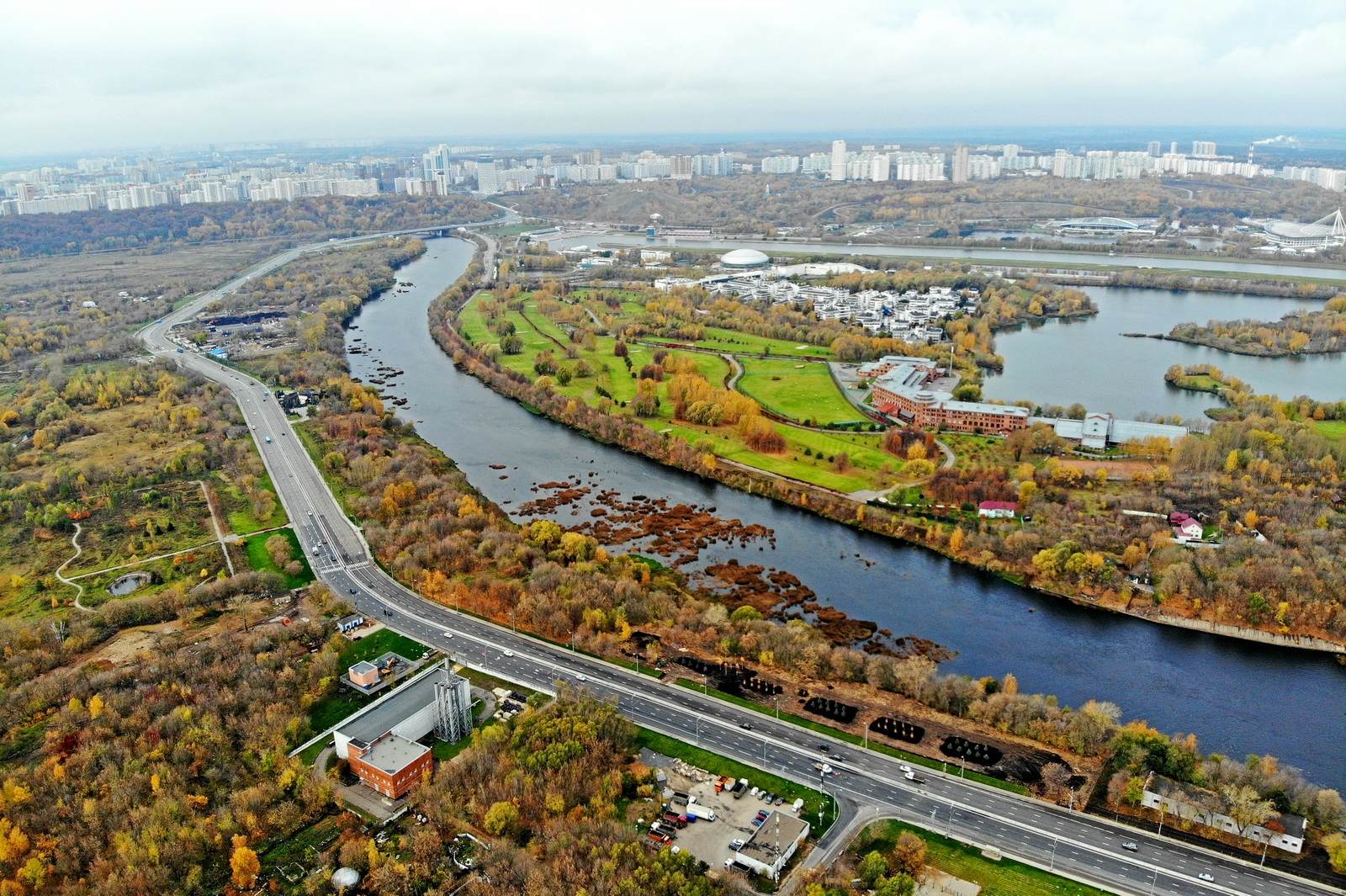
The North-Eastern Chord passes Mnyovnikovskaya floodplain.

== See also ==
- North-Eastern Chord
- South-Eastern Chord
