= List of motorways and expressways in Russia =

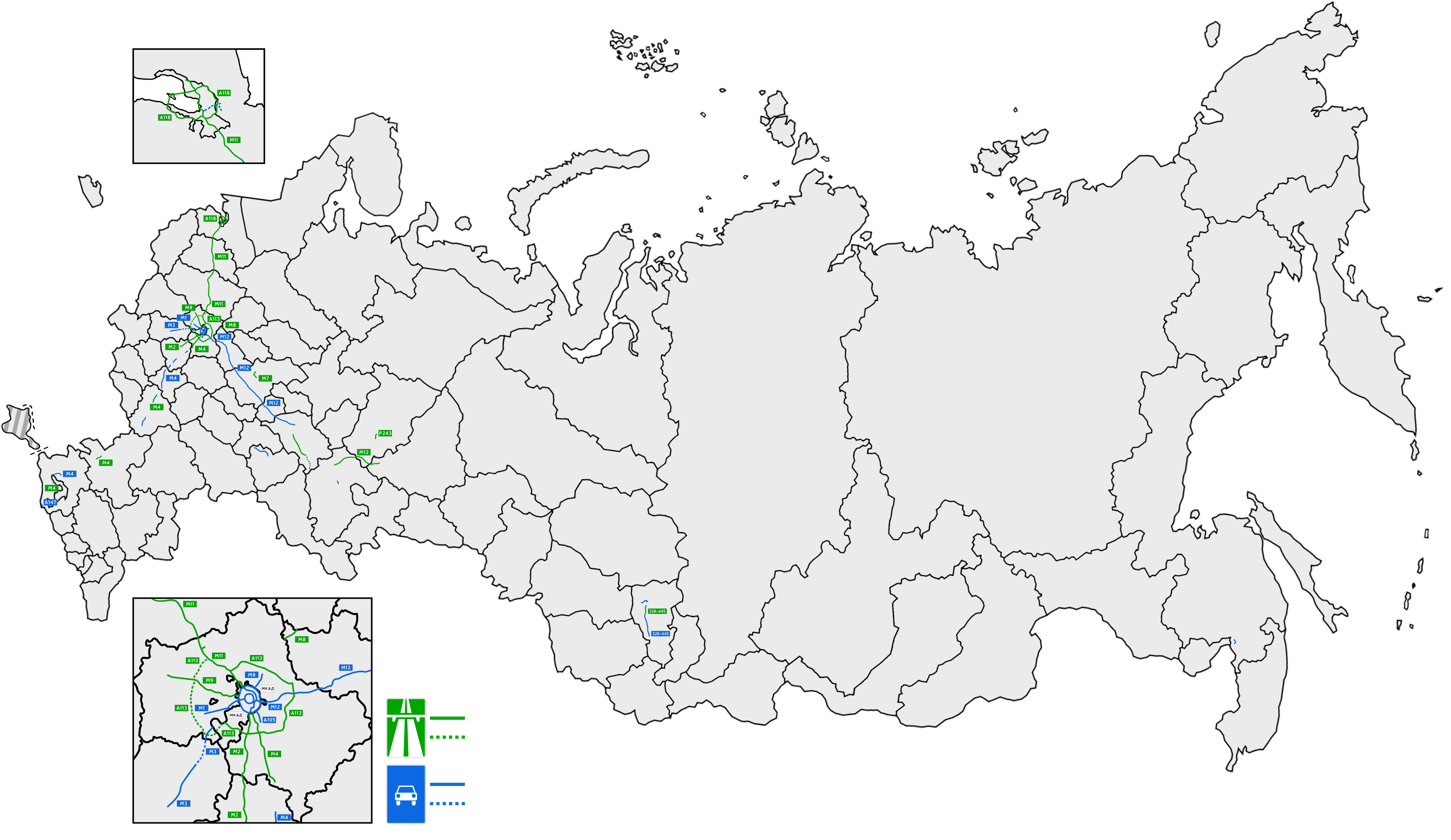
Motorways and expressways in Russia Motorway Motorway planned or under construction Expressway Expressway planned or under construction

This is a list motorway and expressway portions in Russia.

Note that Russian federal highways in their entirety have often been mistakenly called "motorways" in English, even though they are traditionally two-lane physically undivided roads (i.e. not controlled access highways), due to their traditional name "Avtomagistral" (Автомагистраль) which can be translated to "motorway".

The motorways and expressways have the numbering of the Russian federal highway network or their own name, as there is no separate numbering system for motorways and expressways and their sections are mostly part of the Russian federal highway network (however, Western High-Speed Diameter is a part of roads of regional importance network).

The legal speed limit on motorways and expressways is 110 km/h, and 130 km/h on some newly upgraded sections of motorway.

Sections that have been upgraded to motorway status are marked with green signs. Roads that have been upgraded to expressways or dual and single carriageway with road junction are marked with blue signs.

In the classification of roads in Russia, motorways are assigned to technical category IA and expressways to technical category IB.

In 2025, Russia will have a nationwide motorway network with a length of 2,140.9 km and expressway network of 2,773.4 km.

== Motorways ==

Motorways are designated as Category IA roads.

Name or road number	Total length of the road number	Motorway	Total length as motorway
Crimea	720 km	21–178 km (Moscow – Tula)	157 km
Don	1517 km	20–121 km (Moscow – Kashira) 516–544 km (Voronezh – Rogachevka) 1024–1072 km (Novopersianovka – Rostov-on-Don) 1362–1374 km (Psekups – Saratovskaya)	187.7 km
M5; Ural	2089 km	68–87 km (Ulianino - Nepetsino)	20.9 km
Volga	1342 km	0–45 km (Bypass Nizhny Novgorod)	45.2 km
Kholmogory	1271 km	94–112 km (Vladimir Oblast)	18 km
Baltia	610 km	19–114 km (Moscow – Volokolamsk)	95 km
Neva	684 km	15–684 km (Moscow – Saint Petersburg)	669 km
Vostok	1600 km	14–34 km (former , Perm – Zvyozdny) 1211–1486 km (Dyurtyuli – Achit)	295 km
Central Ring Road	525 km	0–251 km (Bukharovo – Lisintsevo)	251 km
Saint Petersburg Ring Road	142.2 km	Entire	142.2 km
	189 km	6–67 km (Kemerovo – Leninsk-Kuznetsky)	61 km
Spur route Klin	4 km	Entire	4 km
Mezhdunarodnoye shosse (Moscow)	3.3 km	Entire	3.3 km
Western Rapid Diameter	46.6 km	Entire	46.6 km
Motorway Shali – Bavly	299 km	52–197 km (Alexeyevskoye – Almetyevsk)	145 km
Total			2,140.9 km

== Former motorways ==
Name or road number	Total length of the road number	Motorway	Total length as motorway	Notes
Ural	1879 km	10 km in Samara Oblast; 24 km in Chelyabinsk Oblast	34 km	Downgraded to Dual carriageway in November 2020
Total			34 km	

== Expressways ==

Expressways are designated as Category IB roads.

Name or road number	Total length of the road number	Expressway	Total length as expressway
Belarus	515 km	0–66 km (Moscow – Kubinka) 380–383 km	73.4 km
Ukraine	474.5 km	3.2–15 km (Leo Tolstoy Village – Kaluga) 65–86 km (Selomovo – Korakovo) 106–194 km (Obninsk – Kaluga)	120 km
Don	1,517 km	170–194 km (Venyov – Karniki) 228–260 km (Bogoroditsk – Kusovka) 296–322 km (Zalesskoe – Pushkari) 339–460 km (Babarykino – Horse-Kolodezsky) 493–516 km (Voronezh International Airport) – Voronezh) 633–715 km (Losevo – Verkhny Mamon) 0–51 km (Krasnodar bypass section: Plastunovskaya – Maryanskaya)	359 km
Ural	3,287.7 km	130–194 km (Yekaterinburg - Cherkaskul) 199–221 km (Ulyanovsk Bypass) 233–235 km (Ulyanovsk Bypass) 1342–1351 km 1365-1380 km 1395-1480 (Ufa Bypass)	199 km
Kholmogory	1271 km	17–35 km (Moscow – Pushkino)	18 km
Russia	872 km	594–674 km (Saint Petersburg – Chudovo)	80.6 km
Vostok	810.3 km	27–837 km (Moscow – Kazan)	810.3 km
	23 km	24–42 km (Moscow – Moscow Domodedovo Airport)	18 km
	239 km	0–8 km 164–167 km 169–204 km (Sochi – Adler)	38.1 km
A157	46.9 km	0–37.5 km (Mineralnye Vody Airport - Yessentukskaya) 46–46.3 km (Kislovodsk)	36.8 km
Scandinavia	160.56 km	65–100 km (Ilyichevo – Kirillovskoye) 203–204 km (Torfyanovka)	36 km
A217 Primorskoye polukoltso	52.4 km	4–46 km	42 km
	178.6 km	3–13.5 km (Novorossiysk) 71.5–72.6 (Dzhiginka) 101–168.6 (Starotitarovskaya – Kerch)	79.2 km
A295	118.9 km	14.3–33.4 km (Yoshkar-Ola – Silikatniy) 114.5–126.3 km (Zelenodolsk – Kazan)	30.9 km
Kola	2,038.8 km	12–52 km (Saint Petersburg – Sinyavino) 68–75 km (Naziya)	46.4 km
Caspian Highway	1,785.2 km	0–7 km (Pushkari – Tambov)	7.4 km
R120	493.1 km	320.1–359.8 km (Smolensk – Pochinok)	39.7 km
Kavkaz	1118 km	1–6 km (Inozemtsevo bypass section) 92–103 km (Maykop) 602–622 km (In Chechnya) 656–659 km (In Chechnya) 708–718 km (In Chechnya) 1–27 km (Gudermes bypass section)	70 km
R228; Syzran - Saratov - Volgograd	714.1 km	661–669 km (Yerzovka)	8.2 km
R240; Ufa - Orenburg	336.8 km	8–112 km (Ufa – Sterlitamak)	104.1 km
	1,133.8 km	172.9–182.9 km (Sibirsky)	10 km
	960.6 km	11.7–30 km (Tyumen - Kaskara) 122.4–124.9 km (Cheganova) 143.5–145 km (Tobolsk)	22.4 km
	189 km	0–6 km (Kemerovo International Airport – Novostroyka) 67–189 km (Leninsk-Kuznetsky – Novokuznetsk)	128 km
Moscow Ring Road	108.9 km	Entire	108.9 km
North-Eastern Chord	40 km	Entire	40 km
South-Eastern Chord	36 km	Entire	26 km
Bagration Avenue (Moscow)	11 km	Entire	10.3 km
Third Ring Road	35.1 km	Entire	35.1 km
Tolyatti Bypass	98.3 km	Entire	98.3 km
Khabarovsk Bypass	52.8 km	13–41 km (Khabarovsk Novy Airport – Ilinka)	27.1 km
Kemerovo Northwestern bypass	47.6 km	Entire	47.6 km
Moscow High-Speed Diameter	68 km	Entire (together with North-Eastern and South-Eastern Chord)	(68 km)
Eastern Speed Diameter (Saint Petersburg)	2.6 km	0–2.6 km (Western Rapid Diameter – Vitebskiy Avenue)	2.6 km
Total			2,773.4 km

== Dual carriageways and toll roads (speed limit 100–110 km/h) ==
Dual carriageways with speed limits of 100–110 km/h are designated as Category IB and IW roads. However, they are not officially signposted as expressways, as some sections are regulated to a speed limit of 90 km/h by lane control lights in winter and some sections are classified as Category IW. Some sections are toll roads.

Name or road number	Total length of the road number	Dual carriageways	Total length as Dual carriageways
Don	1517 km	715–777 km (Boguchar bypass section) 777–933 km (In Rostov Oblast) 1091–1119 km (In Rostov Oblast)	246 km
Ural	2089 km	28–37 km (Oktyabrskoye-Ostrovets bypass section) 982–1031 km (Tolyatti – Samara)	58 km
Volga	858 km	879–896 km (Kazan - Naberezhnye Chelny) 975–985 km (Kazan - Naberezhnye Chelny)	27 km
Vostok	~1600 km	33–47 km (Bershet - Kukushtan, former P242 Perm — Yekaterinburg)	14 km
Orenburgsky Trakt	900 km	14–20 km (Kazan - Kazan International Airport)	6 km
Sortavala	512.7 km	1–72 km (A118 - Varshko)	71 km
A229	25 km	10–25 km (Kaliningrad - Chernyakhovsk - Chernyshevskoye)	15 km
A289	119 km	14–133 km (Crimean Bridge - Krasnodar bypass section)	119 km
Ussuri	760 km	622–637 km 675-690 km	30 km
05A-614	14 km	0–14 km (from to Amur Bay Bridge)	14 km
27A-007	15.3 km	0–15.3 km (Kaliningrad north bypass)	15.3 km
Mytishchi High-Speed Chord	16.1 km	Entire	16.1 km
Total			631.4 km

== Motorways or expressways under construction or planned ==
Name or road number	Section	Technical category	Total length	Notes
Belarus	66–160 km (Moscow Oblast)	IB (Expressway)	94 km	Reconstruction of M1 to 2030
Crimea	178–456 km (Tula western bypass)	IA (Motorway)	54 km	Section between Aleshnya and Lapotkovo near Shchekino is planned
Ukraine	86–124 km (Korakovo – Maloyaroslavets)	IB (Expressway)	38 km	Reconstruction of M3 from 2024 to 2026
Central Ring Road	251–403 km (Lisintsevo – M11)	IA (Motorway)	152 km	Start of construction in 2025
	0–171 km (Dzhubga – Sochi)	IB (Expressway)	171 km	The section will be completed in 2029
Motorway Shali – Bavly	197–299 km (Almetyevsk – Bavly)	IA (Motorway)	102 km	Section is planned
Adler bypass	0–7.8 km (North of Adler)	IB (Expressway)	7.8 km	The section will be completed in 2026
Eastern Speed Diameter	2.6–27.4 km (Vitebskiy Avenue – R21)	IB (Expressway)	24.8 km	Section is planned
Total			643.6 km	

== See also ==
- Russian federal highways
- Transport in Russia
