= Moscow Chord Ring =

Ring road under construction in Moscow

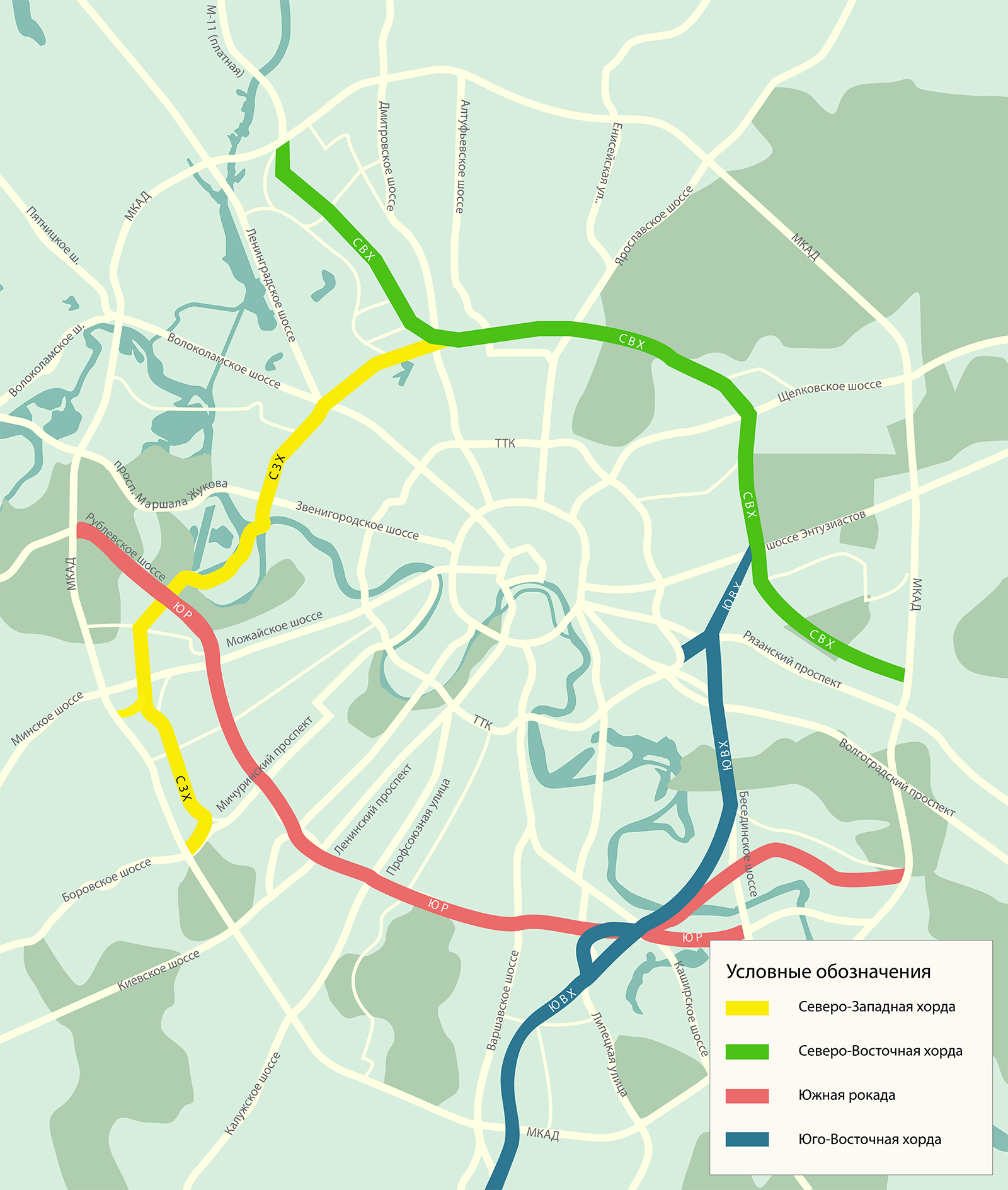
- North-Western Chord (yellow); North-Eastern Chord (green); South-Eastern Chord (blue); Southern Rocade (pink)

Route information
- Length: 133 km (83 mi)

Location
- Country: Russia

Highway system
- Russian Federal Highways

The Chord Ring of Moscow is a ring road under construction between the Third Ring Road and the Moscow Ring Road, formed of four separate chords and bypasses: the North-Eastern, North-Western and South-Eastern chords, as well as the Southern Rocade. Currently, some sections of the chord ring are ready, others are in the phase of design and active construction. The total cost of the road ring is estimated at 630 billion rubles. Completion of construction is scheduled for 2024.
