= Southern Rocade =

Bypass arterial road under construction in Russia

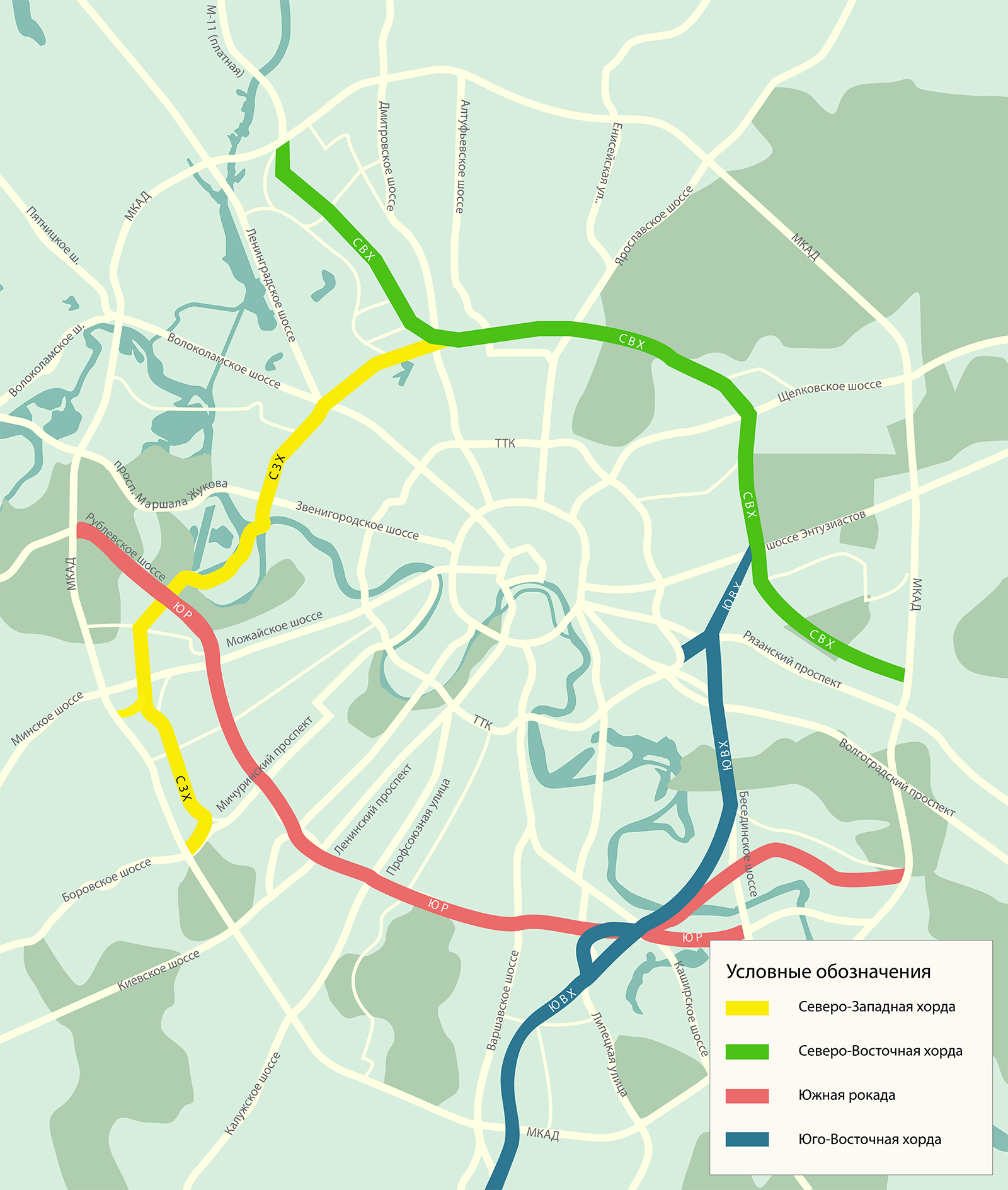
- The Southern Rocade (pink) is a part of Moscow Chord Ring.

Route information
- Length: 40 km (25 mi)

Location
- Country: Russia

Highway system
- Russian Federal Highways

The Southern Rocade (Russian: Южная рокада) is a planned bypass arterial road in Moscow which is a part of Moscow Chord Ring. Its completion is scheduled for 2023.

== Gallery ==
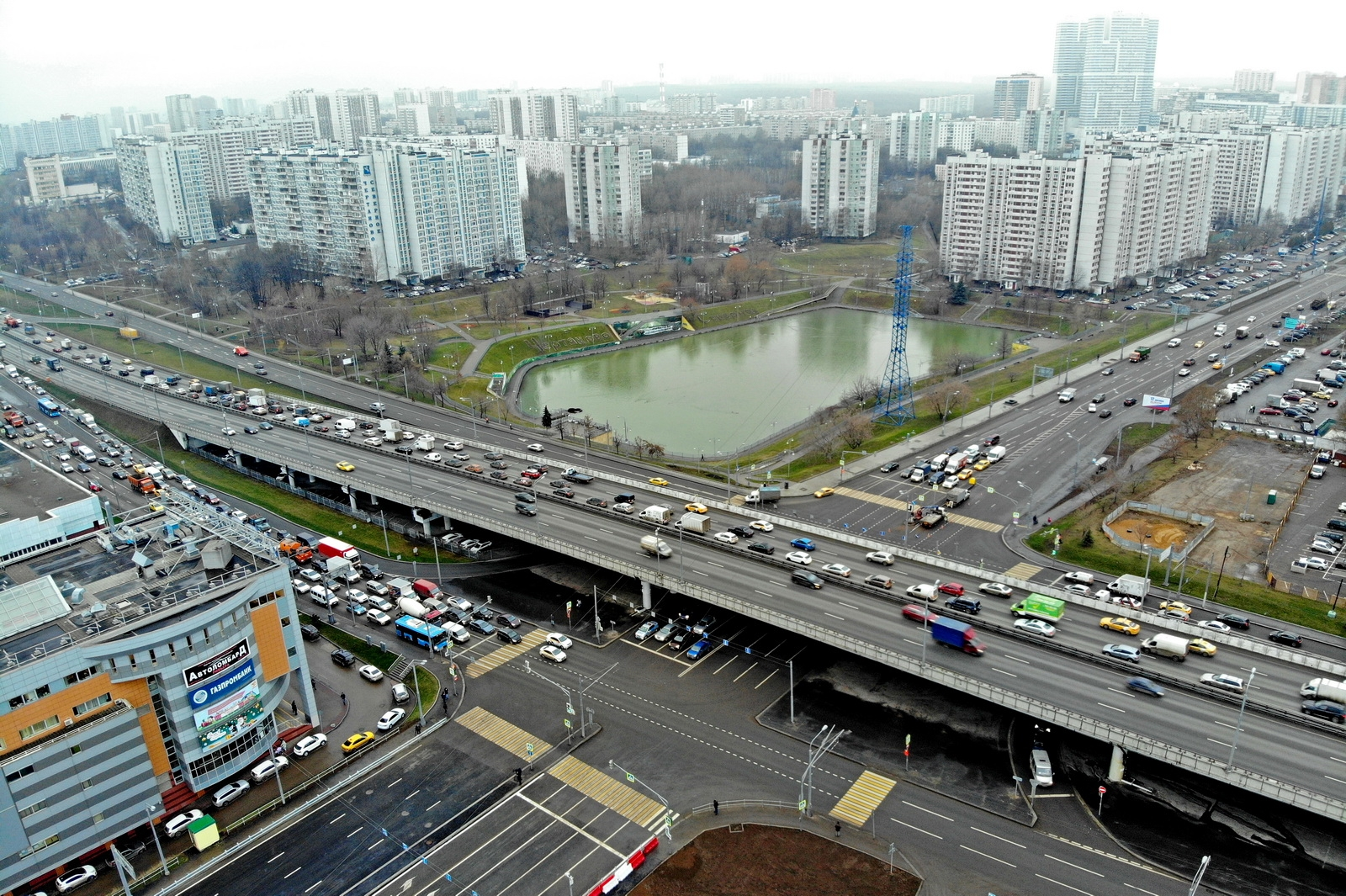
An interchange with Varshavskoye Highway (in the upper level) opened in 2019.

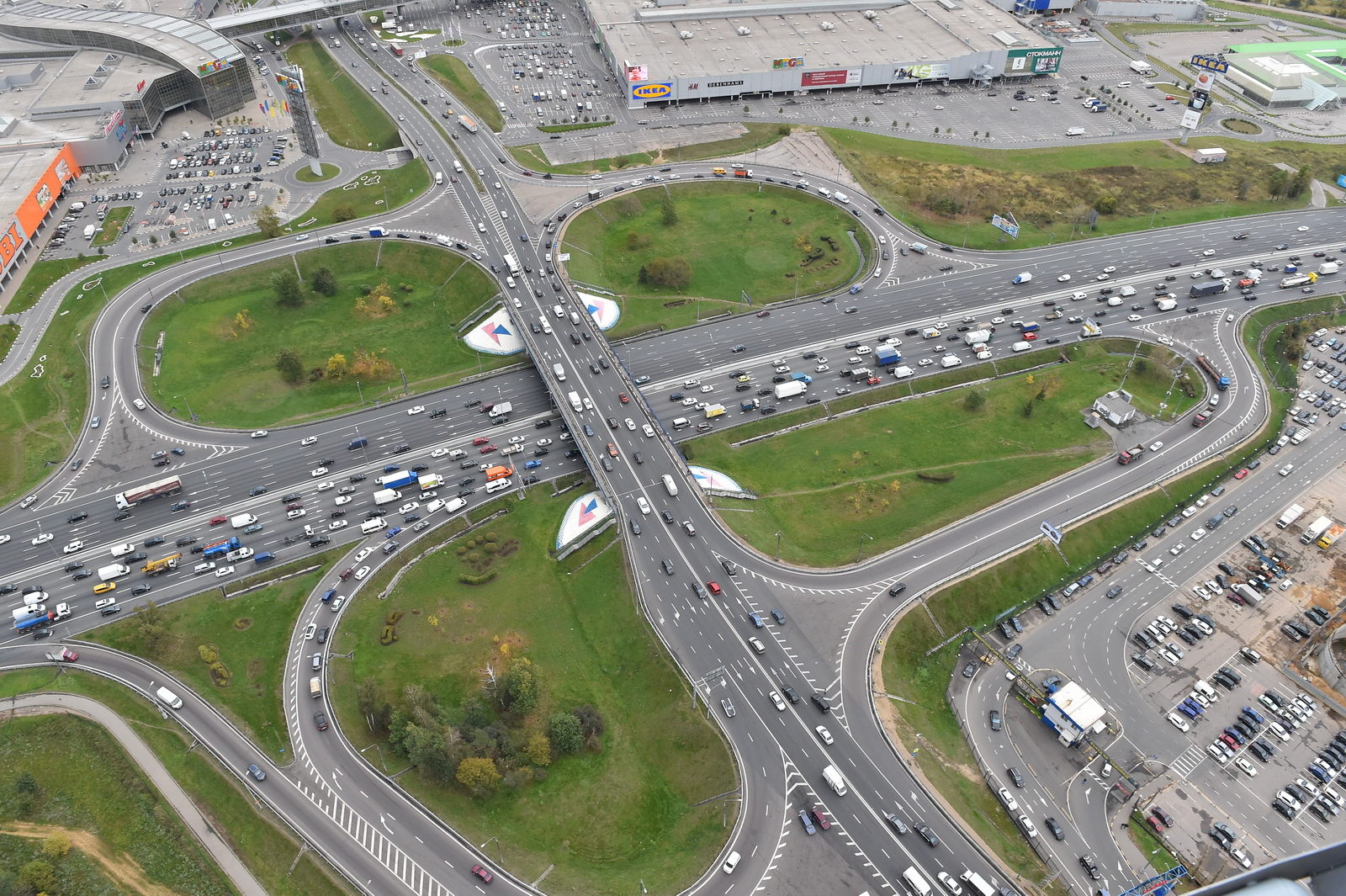
An interchange of the future Southern Rocade with the Moscow Ring Road in the South-East of Moscow. This interchange will be rebuilt to allow more intensive traffic.

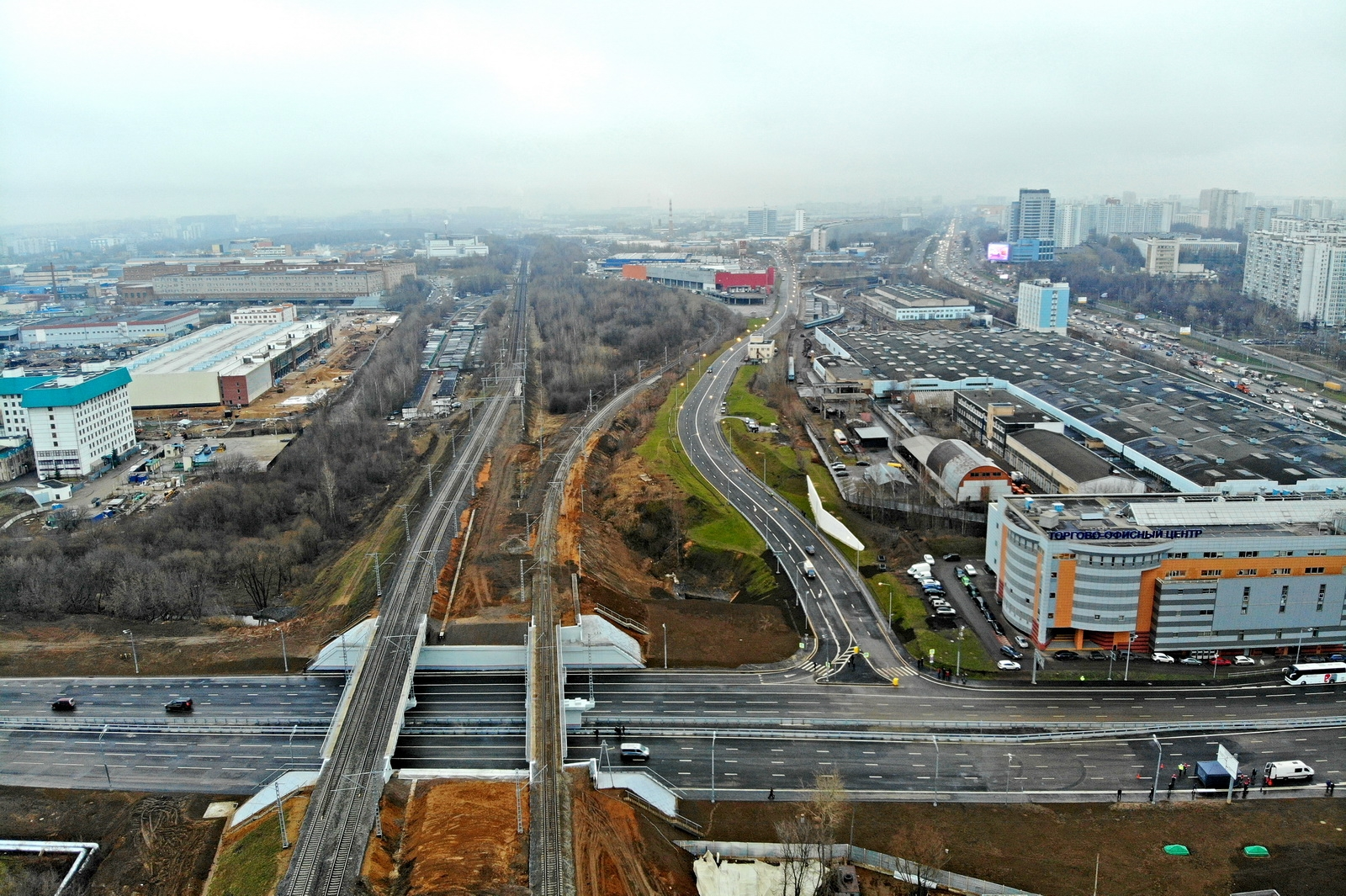
In the photo, the Paveletsky suburban railway line crosses the Southern Rocade from the top. A little to the right is the exit from the Rocade to Dorozhnaya Street.

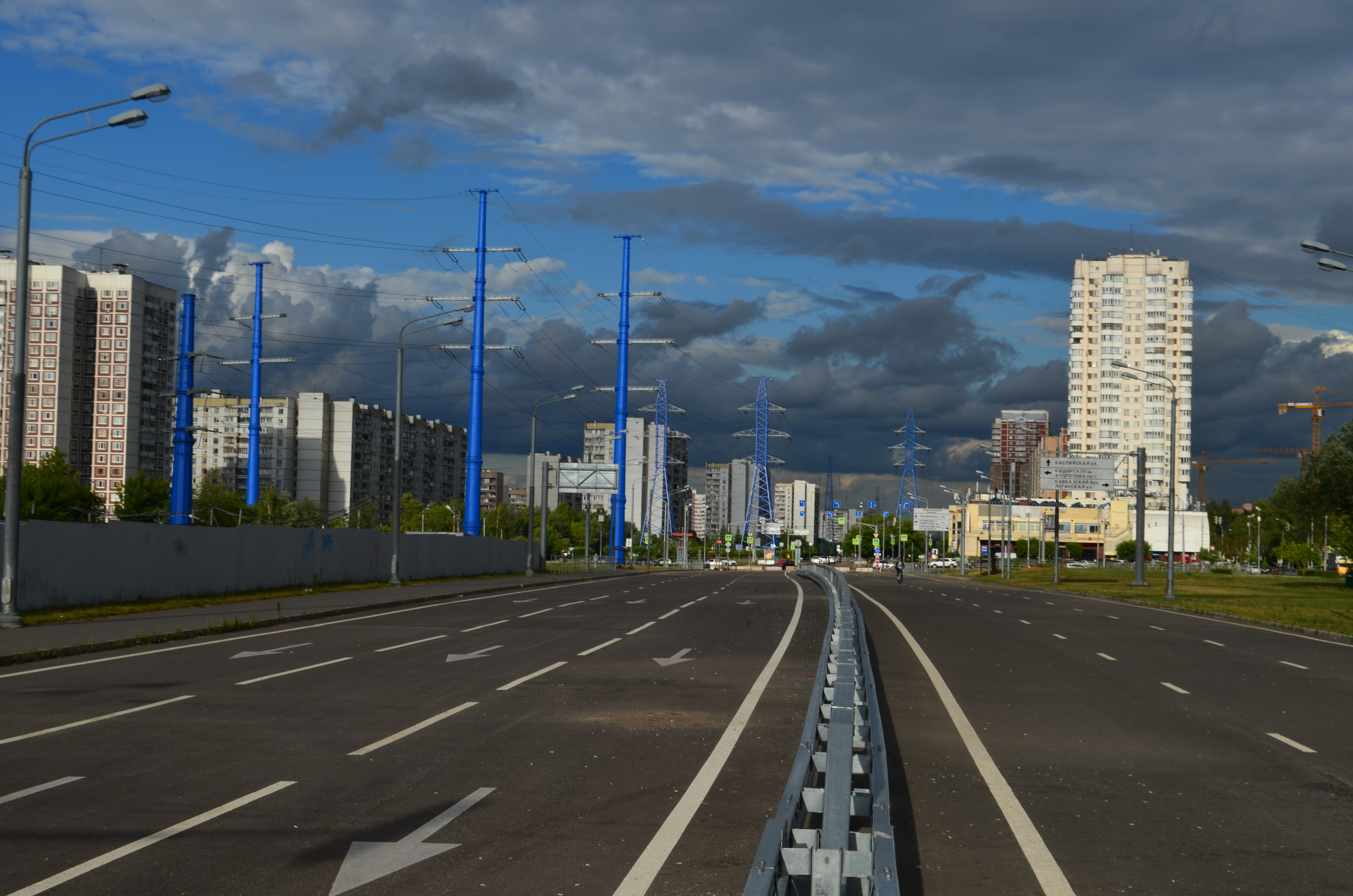
A part of the planned Southern Rocade near Kantemirovskaya metro station before opening in June 2019
