= M12 highway (Russia) =

Future Russian federal highway

Vostok Highway
- Федеральная автомобильная дорога М12
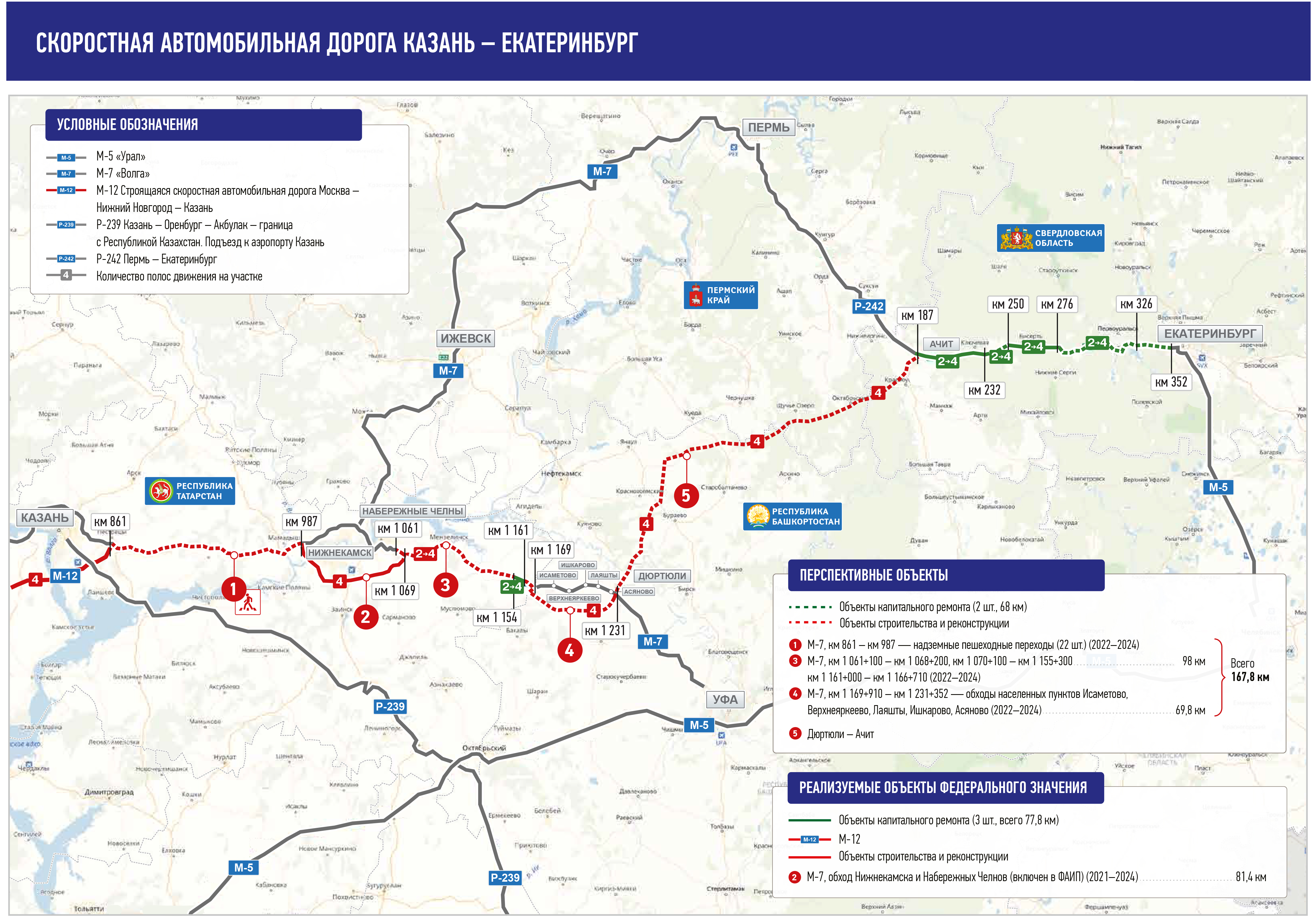

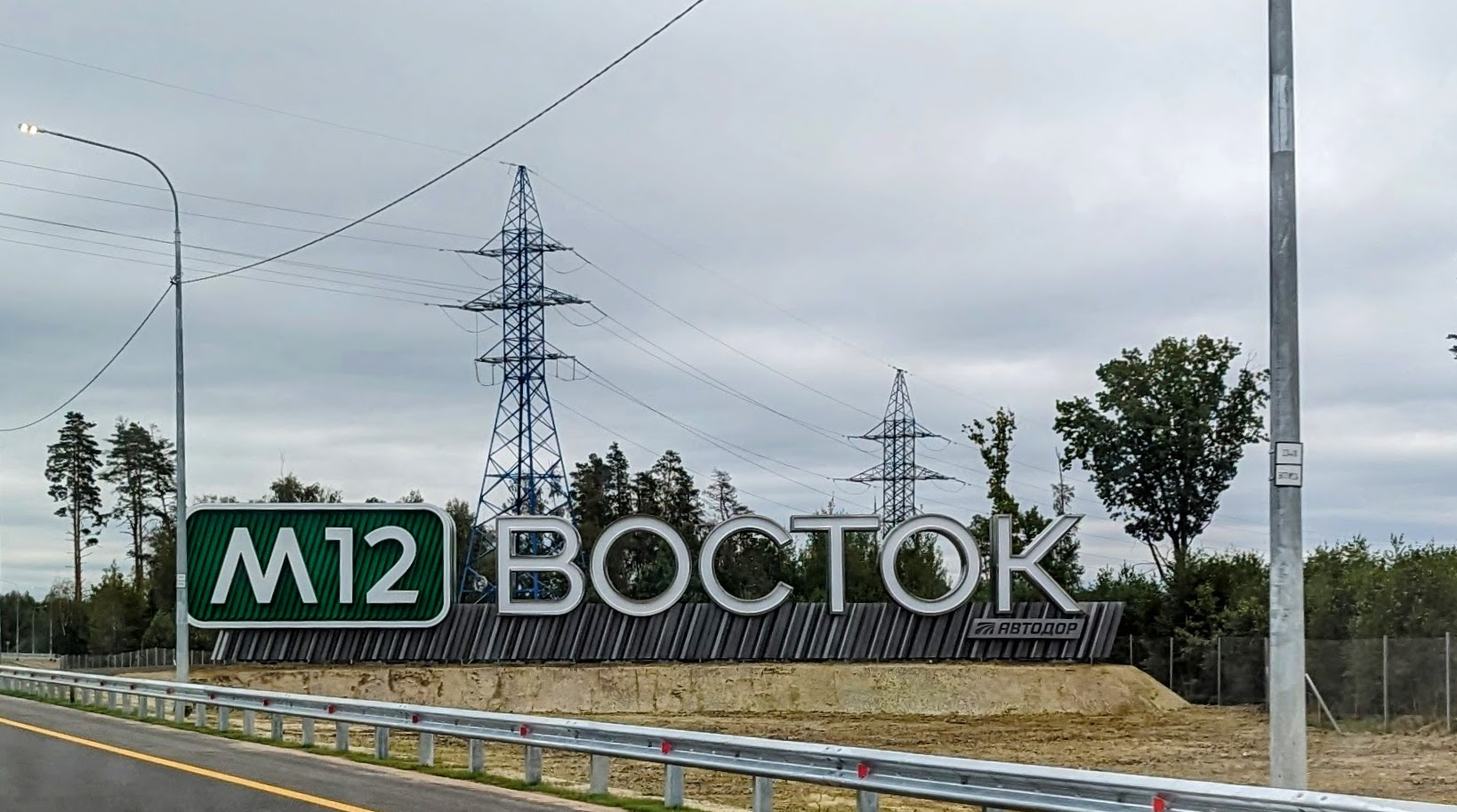

Route information
- Length: 794 km (493 mi)
- Existed: c.2022–present

Major junctions
- West end: Moscow
- East end: Tyumen

Location
- Country: Russia

Highway system
- Russian Federal Highways
← M 11

The Federal Motorway М12 "Vostok" (Russian: Скоростная федеральная автомобильная дорога М12 «Восток»), is a highway under construction in the European part of Russia, running between the M7 and M5 highways, serving from the federal city of Moscow to Tyumen. Its construction will be finished by 2027 and will cost around 612 billion rubles. On 23 May 2020, it became known that according to the latest plans, it is planned to speed up the construction of the highway and hand it over in 2024. The M12's total length will be 1600 km.

== History ==
On 10 July 2020, Russian Prime Minister Mikhail Mishustin said at a meeting on the construction of the Western Europe – Western China Highway in Yelabuga that the government of Russia had determined the terms of tender procedures and the amount of funding for the construction of the Moscow–Kazan motorway.

On July 27, tenders were announced for the construction of 729 km of the motorway.

On 8 September 2022, the first section (21 km long) was opened for traffic, connecting the Central Ring Road (ЦКАД) and the Moscow Big Ring.

The implemention of nickname "Vostok" has de facto tentatively placed at some construction places of M12, on 1 October 2023, Russian Federal Government decided to officially name the M12 highway as Vostok highway, replaced A375's same nickname.
