= Central Ring Road (Russia) =

Road in Russia

Central Ring Road
- Центральная кольцевая автомобильная дорога
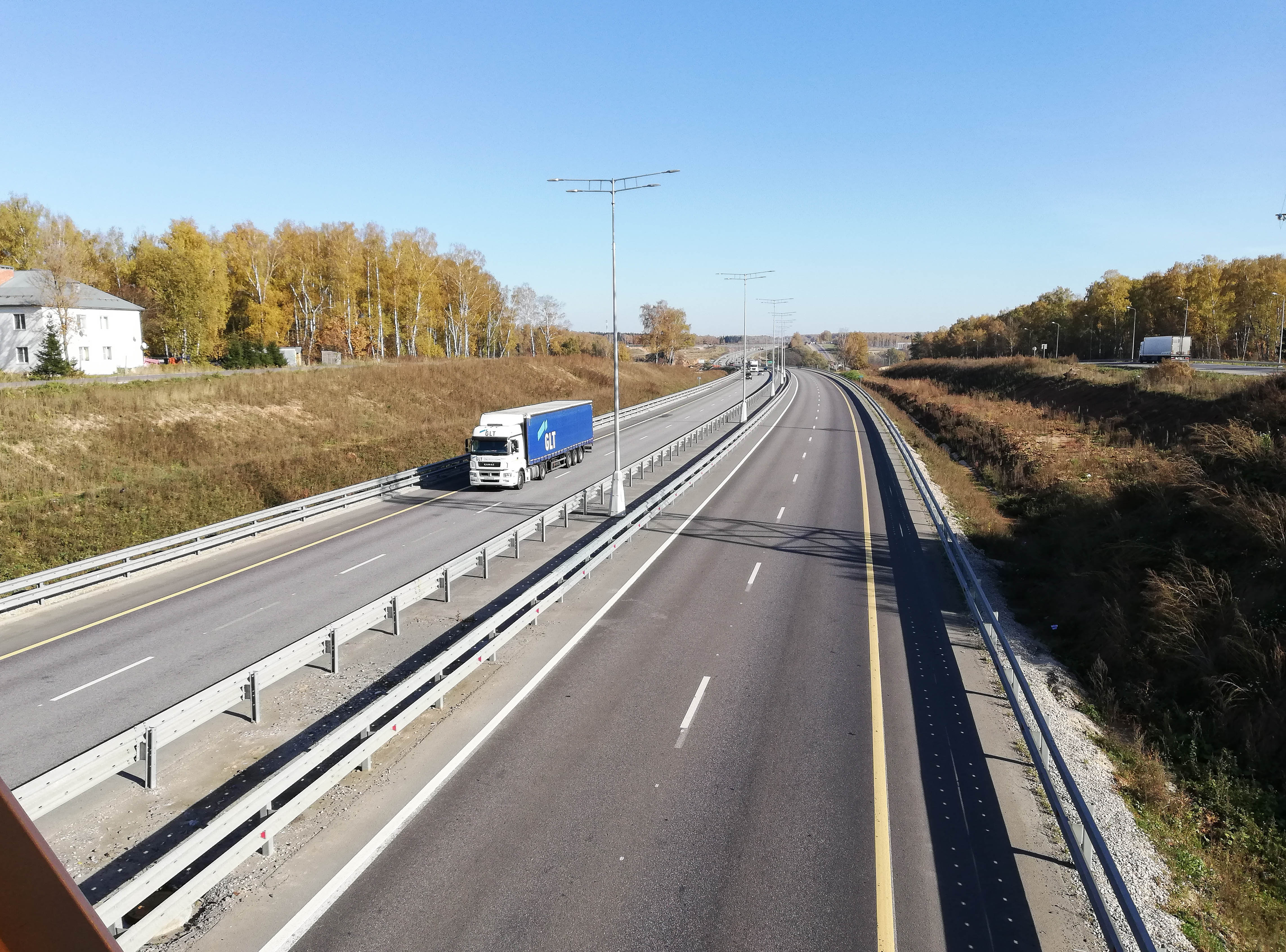

Route information
- Length: 525 km (326 mi)

Location
- Country: Russia
- Major cities: Moscow

Highway system
- Russian Federal Highways
← A 112	→ A 114

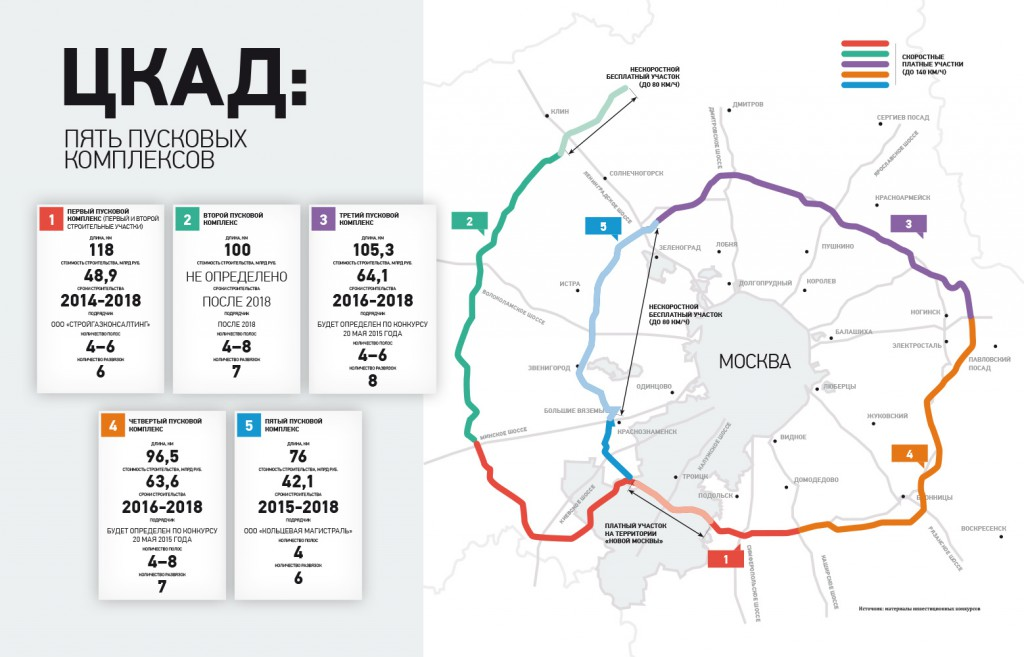
Map of the Central Ring Road

Central Ring Road (Russian: Центральная кольцевая автомобильная дорога, ЦКАД) is a Russian federal highway in Moscow Oblast and Moscow. It runs well outside the Moscow Ring Road.

The main purpose of the Central Ring Road is to unload federal roads and the Moscow Ring Road by redistributing the transit flow of vehicles bypassing Moscow.

== Characteristics ==
- Length: 525 km
- Average speed: 80–140 km/h
- Number of interchanges: 34
- Number of bridges and overpasses: 278
- Number of lanes: from 4 to 8
