= North-Eastern Chord =

Highway in Moscow

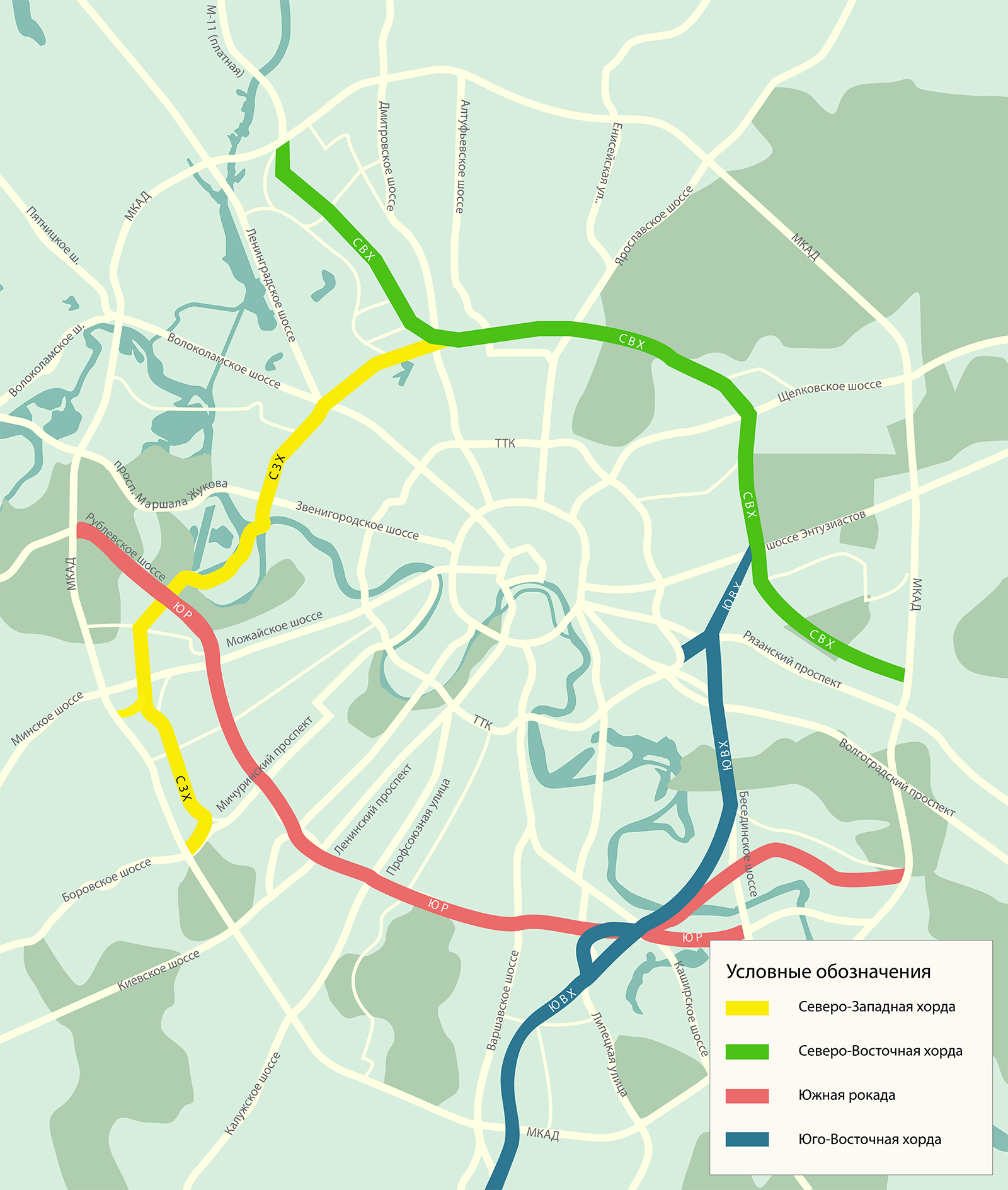
- North-Eastern Chord (green) is a part of Moscow Chord Ring

Route information
- Length: 29 km (18 mi)
- History: Completed September 22, 2022

Location
- Country: Russia

Highway system
- Russian Federal Highways

The North-Eastern Chord (Russian: Северо-Bосточная Xорда, romanized: Severo-Vostochnaya Khorda), abbreviated as CBX, is a motorway in Moscow that was completed and opened on September 22, 2022.

The 29 kilometres (18 mi) motorway starts from the south end of the Moscow-Saint Petersburg motorway to along the Little Ring of the Moscow Railway, and ends at the Veshnyaki-Lyubertsy interchange with the Moscow Ring Road (MKAD), where east-bound the expressway gives access to Kosinskaya Highway and ultimately the M12 highway. The motorway links the Northern Administrative Okrug and the South-Eastern Administrative Okrug and will help unload traffic at the MKAD by 20—25% and redistribute traffic flows at the Third Ring Road, Shchelkovsky highway, Entuziastov highway, Ryazansky Avenue, and Volgogradsky Avenue.

== Route description ==
The completed sections of the CBX begins at the Veshnyaki-Lyubertsy interchange with the Moscow Ring Road (MKAD) where east-bound the expressway gives access to Kosinskaya Highway and ultimately the M12 highway. The CBX then runs under an interchange with Papernika Street and then running adjacent to Kosino-Ukhtomsky Lesopark. It then overpasses the Gorkovsky suburban railway line and later is interchanged with Kuzkovskaya Street where access to the street is only from the north-west of the CBX. The interchange of the CBX and the South-Eastern Chord (ЮBX) directs the CBX to a ramp that leads northward, becoming the northern end of the ЮBX, while the central lanes ending at Budennogo Avenue.

Shortly north of the interchange with ЮBX, the CBX runs adjacent to the Moscow Central Circle (MCC) before running over an interchange with Entuziastov Highway. The expressway runs northward still adjacent to the MCC where it runs under an interchange with Bolshaya Cherkizovskaya Street. Still adjacent to the MCC. the CBX curves north-west where the expressway has ramps to Otkrytoye Highway, Ivanteyevskaya Street via the 5-Y Podbel'skogo Passageway, and Losinoostrovskaya Street. The CBX through a forest until it runs under two railway overpasses and over the Yaroslavsky suburban railway line where it then runs an interchange with Mira Avenue.

== Gallery ==
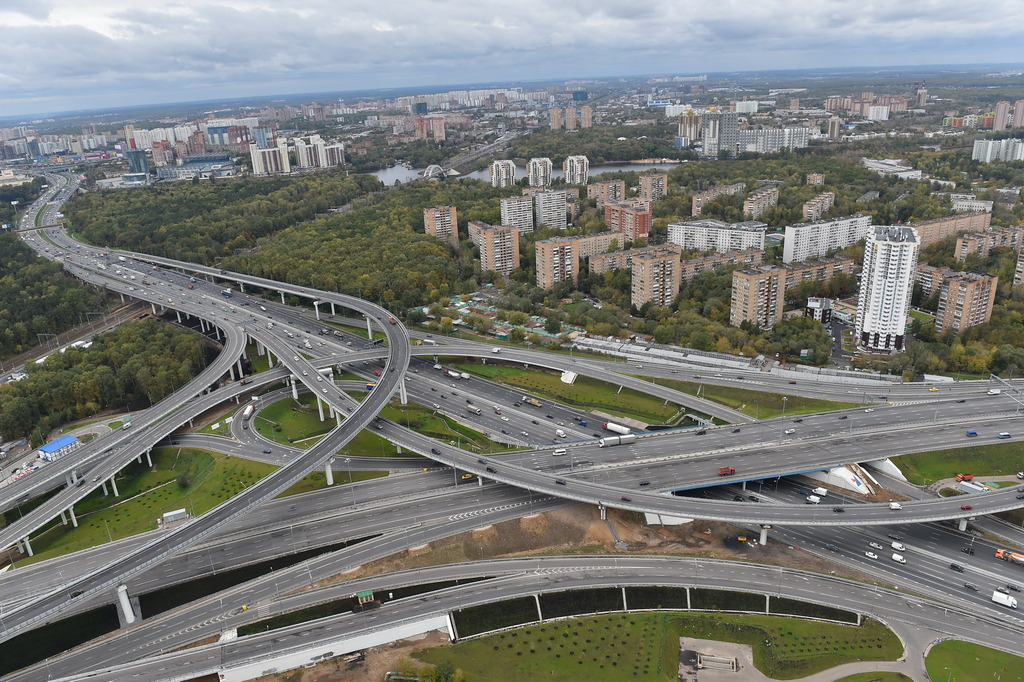
Businovskaya interchange of North-Eastern Chord and Moscow Ring Road. It is the biggest interchange in Russia.

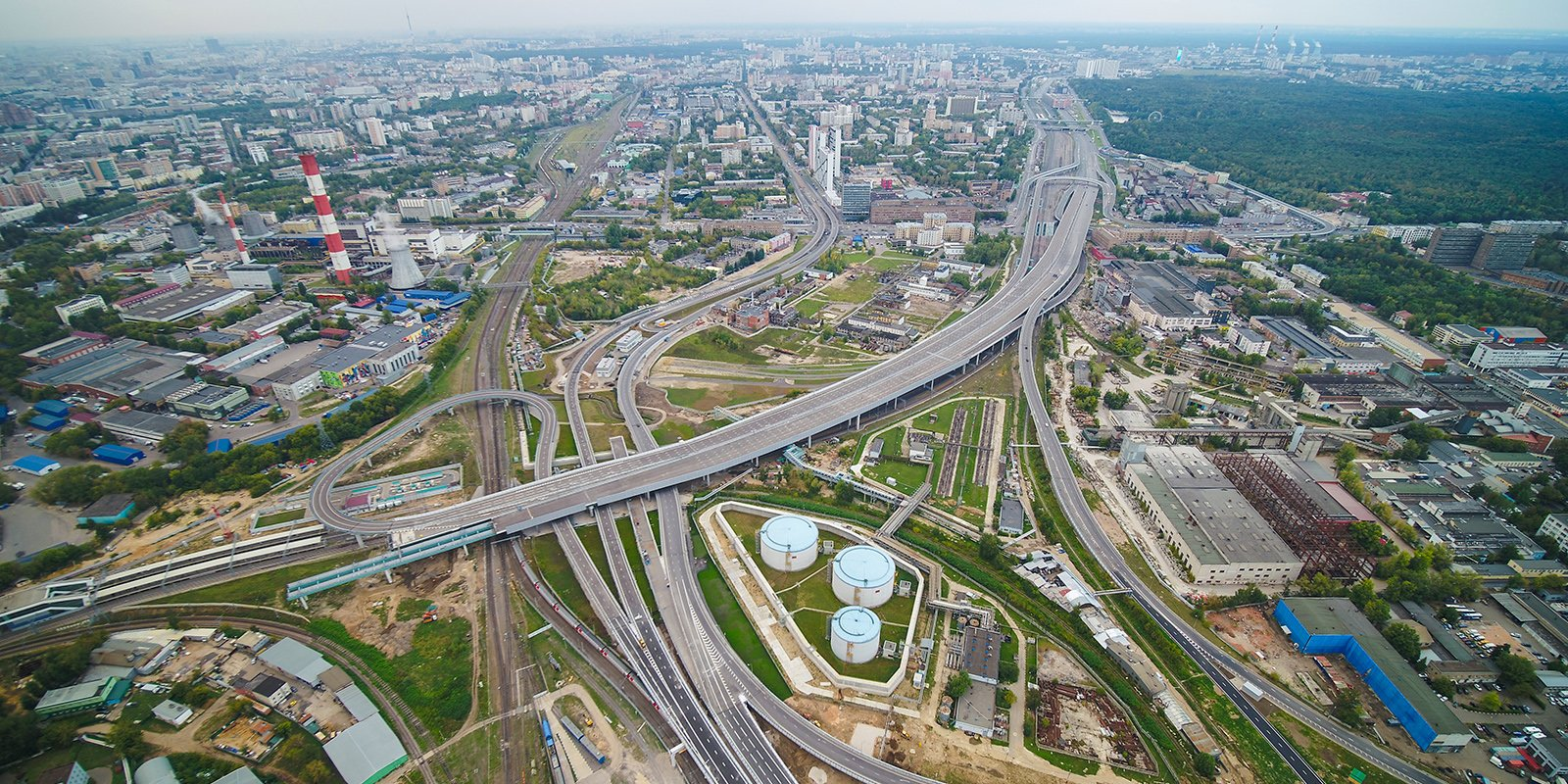
Interchange of North-Eastern Chord and future South-Eastern Chord near Andronovka station

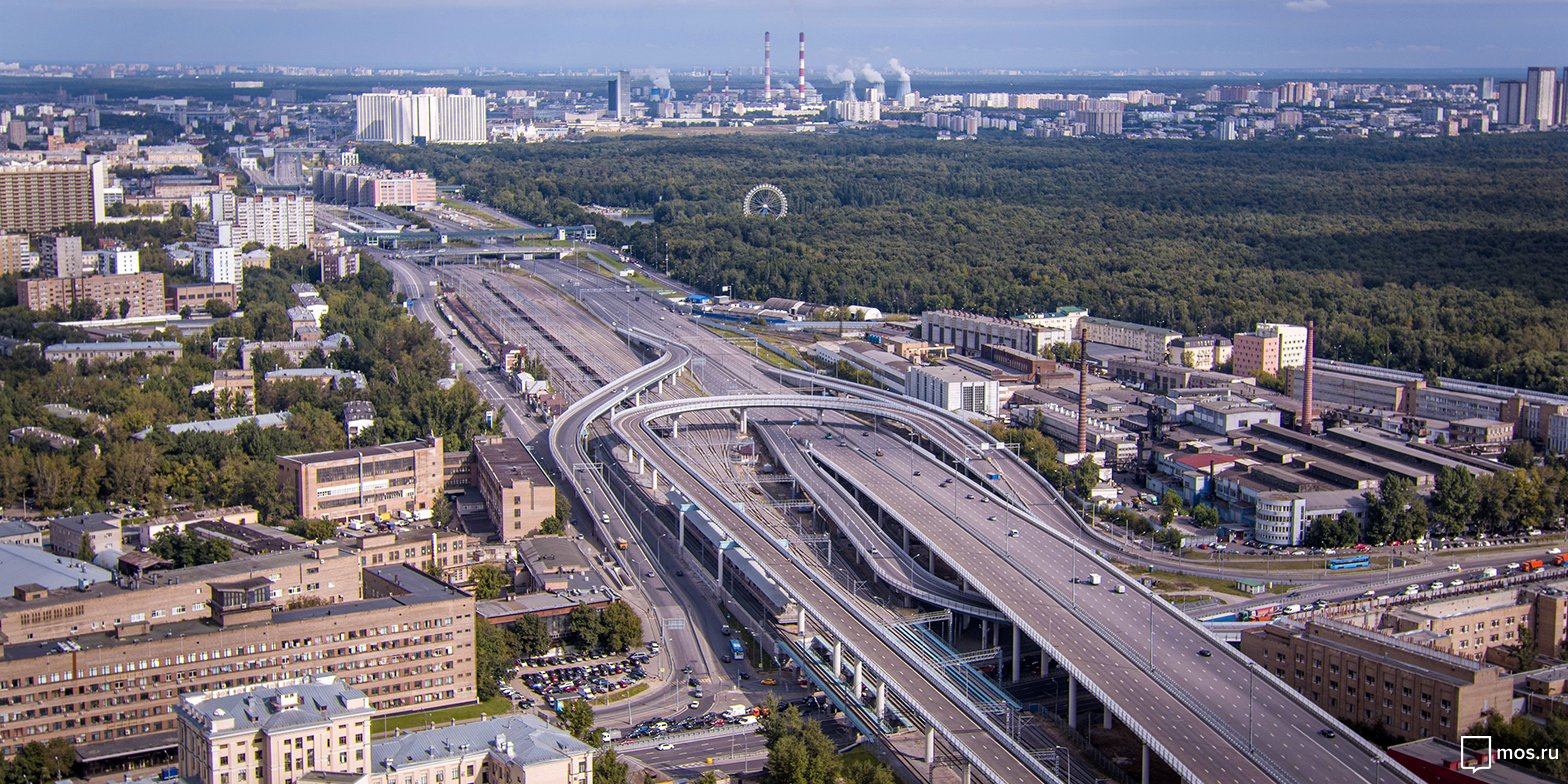
Interchange of North-Eastern Chord and Entuziastov Highway
