= South-Eastern Chord =

Expressway under construction in Moscow

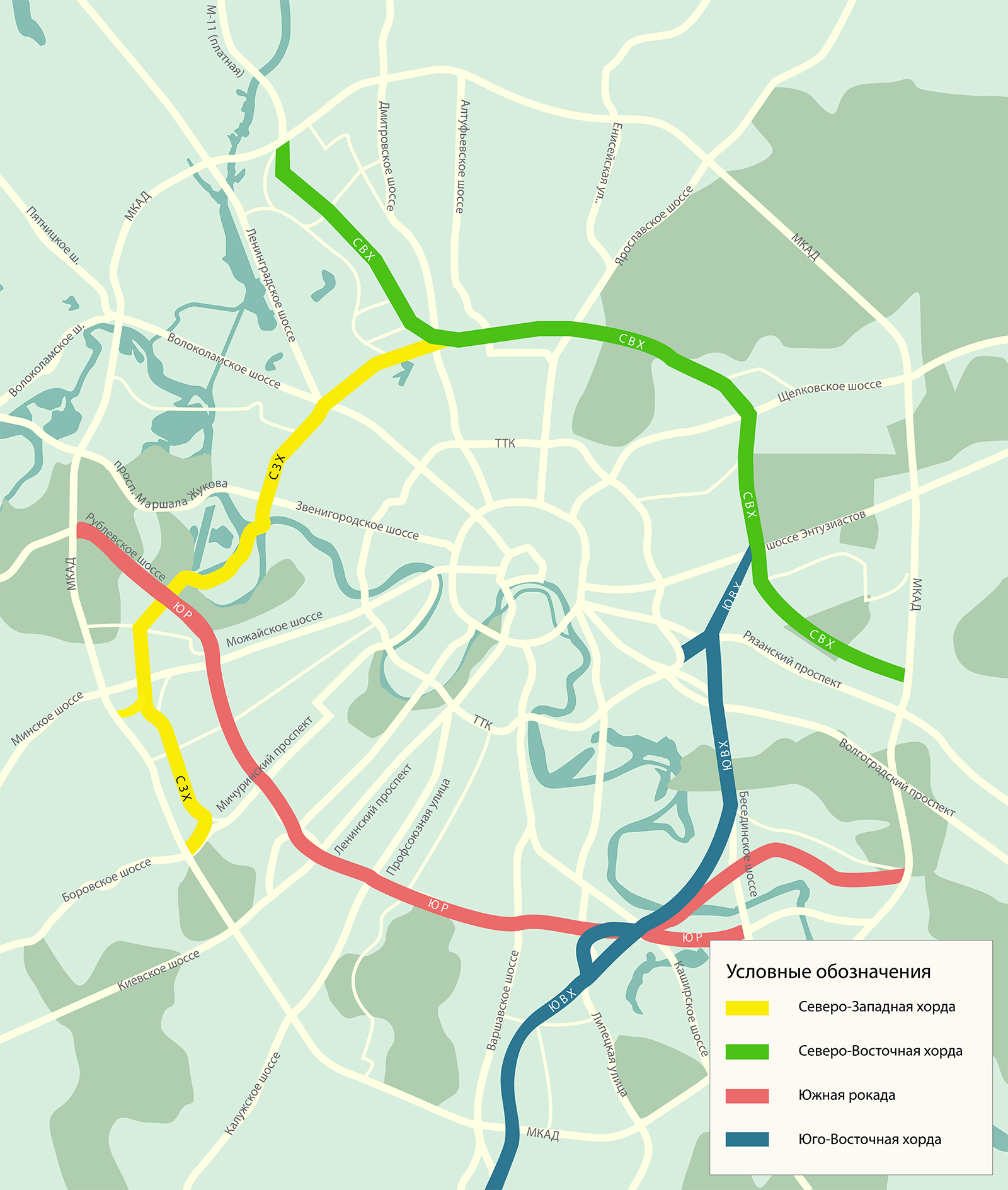
- South-Eastern Chord (blue) is a part of Moscow Chord Ring

Route information
- Length: 36 km (22 mi)
- History: Under construction

Location
- Country: Russia

Highway system
- Russian Federal Highways

The South-Eastern Chord (Russian: Юго-Восточная хорда, romanized: Yugo-Vostochnaya Khorda), abbreviated as ЮВХ, is an expressway under construction in Moscow. The South-East Chord will be connected with the North-East Chord and the Southern Rocade, as well as with the Third Ring Road in the area of Novokhokhlovskaya railway station of the Kursky line of the Moscow Railway. It will be located in the South-Eastern, Southern and partially Eastern Administrative Okrugs of Moscow.
