= Moscow Ring Road =

Circumferential artery around Russia's capital

Moscow Ring Road (MKAD) Московская кольцевая автомобильная дорога

- MKAD on Moscow map

Route information
- Part of E22 E30 E101 E105 E115 E119
- Length: 108.9 km (67.7 mi)
- Existed: 1961–present

Location
- Country: Russia
- Major cities: Moscow

Highway system
- Russian Federal Highways

The Moscow Automobile Ring Road (Russian: Московская кольцевая автомобильная дорога, romanized: Moskovskaya koltsevaya avtomobilnaya doroga), or MKAD (Russian: МКАД), is a ring road running predominantly on the city border of Moscow, with a length of 108.9 km (67.7 mi) and 35 exits (including ten interchanges). Completed in 1962, the road has a speed limit of 100 km/h.

== History ==
The growth of traffic in and around Moscow in the 1950s made city planners realise that Russia's largest metropolis needed a bypass to reroute incoming traffic from major roads that run through the city. Construction started in 1956. Opened in 1962, the MKAD had four asphalt lanes and ran 108.9 kilometres along the city's borders. Although not then a freeway, it featured interchanges at major junctions, very few traffic lights, and a speed limit of 100 km/h (62 mph).

From 1960 to 1984 the MKAD ran around the administrative boundary of Moscow, but in the 1980s the city began annexing territory outside the beltway. In December 2002, Bulvar Dmitriya Donskogo became the first Moscow Metro station to open beyond the limits of the MKAD.

The road was widened from four lanes to ten between 1995 and 1999; all intersections became grade-separated, pedestrian bridges were built, traffic lights were removed, and a solid concrete barrier was installed in the median. In 2001, slow-moving vehicles were banned from entering the MKAD, and the renovated road received a freeway designation from the mayor's office.

== Route ==
The kilometre numbering begins at the junction with Entuziastov Highway and increases clockwise around the ring. A new exit numbering system was introduced on 10 February 2014, with even-numbered exits leading towards central Moscow and odd-numbered exits towards Moscow Oblast.

km	Destinations	Notes
0	M 7 (Entuziastov Highway) – Nizhny Novgorod	Eastern beginning of the MKAD
2	Sayanskaya Street, Pobeda Street – Reutov	
4	Ketcherskaya Street, Nosovikhinskoye Highway – Balashikha, Elektrougli	
6	Nikolaya Starostina Street	
7	Moldagulovoy Street, Novoukhtomskoye Highway	
8	North-Eastern Chord, Kosinskoye Highway	
8	Ryazansky Prospekt, Lermontovsky Prospekt – Lyubertsy	
11	M 5 (Volgogradsky Prospekt, Novoryazanskoye Highway) – Ryazan, Bykovo Airport	
14	Verkhniye Polya Street, Novoyegoryevskoye Highway – Kotelniki	
16	Kapotnya Street, Energetikov Street – Dzerzhinsky, Kapotnya	
20	Besedinskoye Highway – Besedy	
24	Kashirskoye Highway	
27	M 4 (Lipetskaya Street) – Domodedovo Airport, Vidnoye, Kashira, Rostov-on-Don	
30	Vostryakovsky Proyezd, 46N-04887	
30	Podolskikh Kursantov Street	
32	Southeastern Chord	
33	M 2 (Varshavskoye Highway) – Ostafyevo International Airport, Podolsk	
35	Polyany Street – Butovo	
38	Pavla Fitina Street	
40	Kommunarka Highway	
41	A 130 / Kaluzhskoye Highway	
45	M 3 (Kiyevskoye Highway) / Leninsky Avenue – Vnukovo Airport, Bryansk, Kyiv	
48	Ozyornaya Street, Borovskoye Highway	
50	Generala Dorokhova Prospekt, Torgovaya Street – Zarechye	
53	Skolkovskoye Highway	
55	M 1 (Mozhayskoye Highway) / Minskoye Highway – Smolensk, Brest, Belarus	
56	Gorbunova Street, Moskovskaya Street – Nemchinovka	
57	Molodogvardeyskaya Street	
60	A 106 (Rublevo-Uspenskoye Highway) – Uspenskoye	
61	Rublevskoye Highway – Rublevo	
63	M 9 (Novorizhskoye Highway) / Marshala Zhukova Prospekt – Riga, Velikiye Luki	
65	Myakininsky Proyezd, Proyektiruyemy proyezd No. 5019	
68	A 109 (Volokolamskoye Highway) / Pyatnitskoye Highway – Dedovsk, Petrovo-Dalneye	
73	Novokurkinskoye Highway – Kurkino	
74	Svobody Street, Molodezhnaya Street – Kurkino	
75	M 10 – Sheremetyevo International Airport, Khimki, Saint Petersburg	
77	North-Eastern Chord, M 11	Businovskaya interchange; five-level interchange
79	Businovsky Proyezd, Likhachevskoye Highway – Dolgoprudny	
82	A 104 (Dmitrovskoye Highway) – Dubna, Dmitrov	
85	Altufyevskoye Highway – Veshki	
90	Ostashkovskoye Highway	
94	M 8 (Yaroslavskoye Highway) – Yaroslavl	
103	Khabarovskaya Street – Abramtsevo	
105	A 103 (Shchelkovskoye Highway) – Shchyolkovo	
1.000 mi = 1.609 km; 1.000 km = 0.621 mi

== Gallery ==
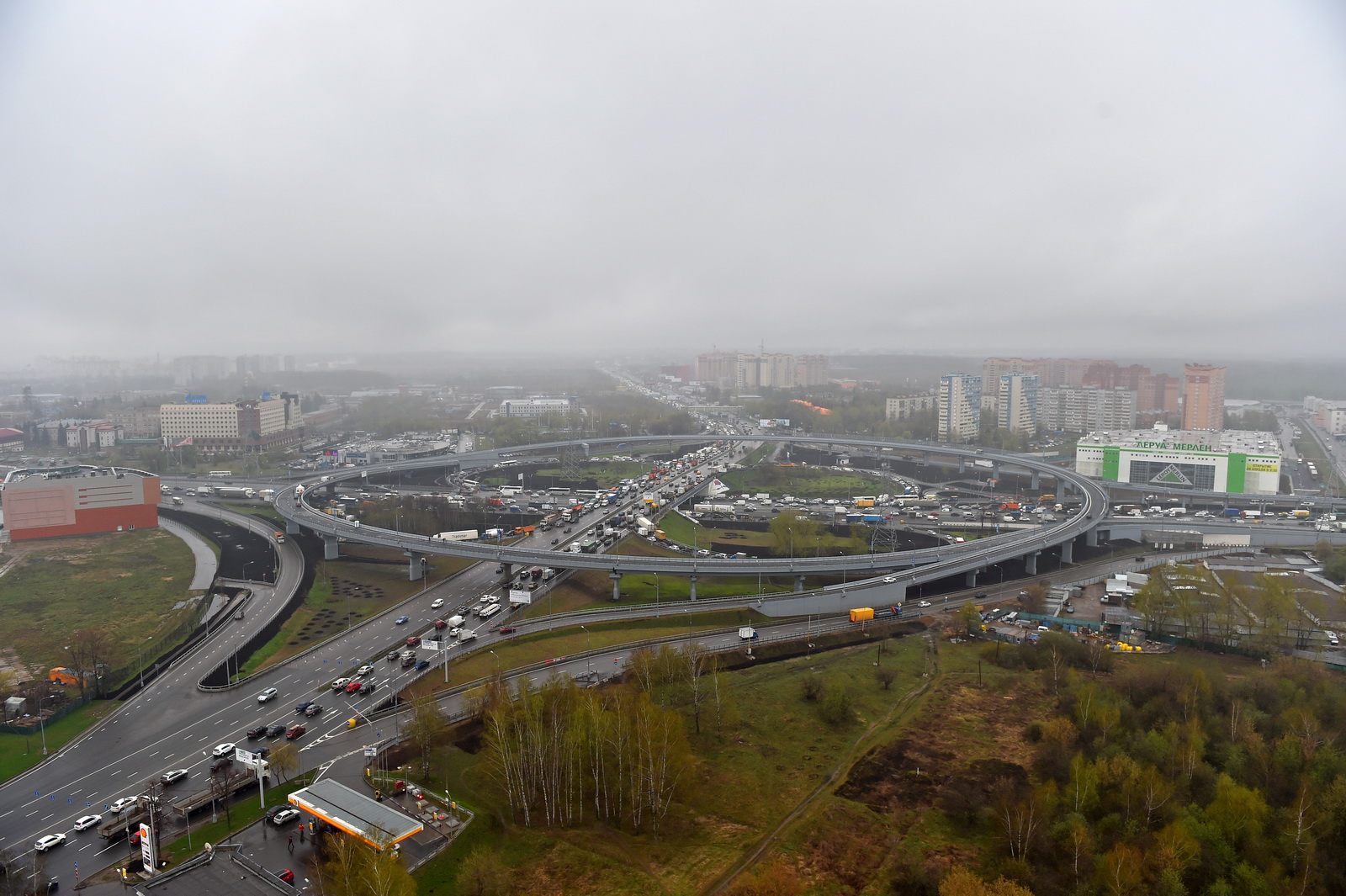
Interchange with Kashirskoye Highway

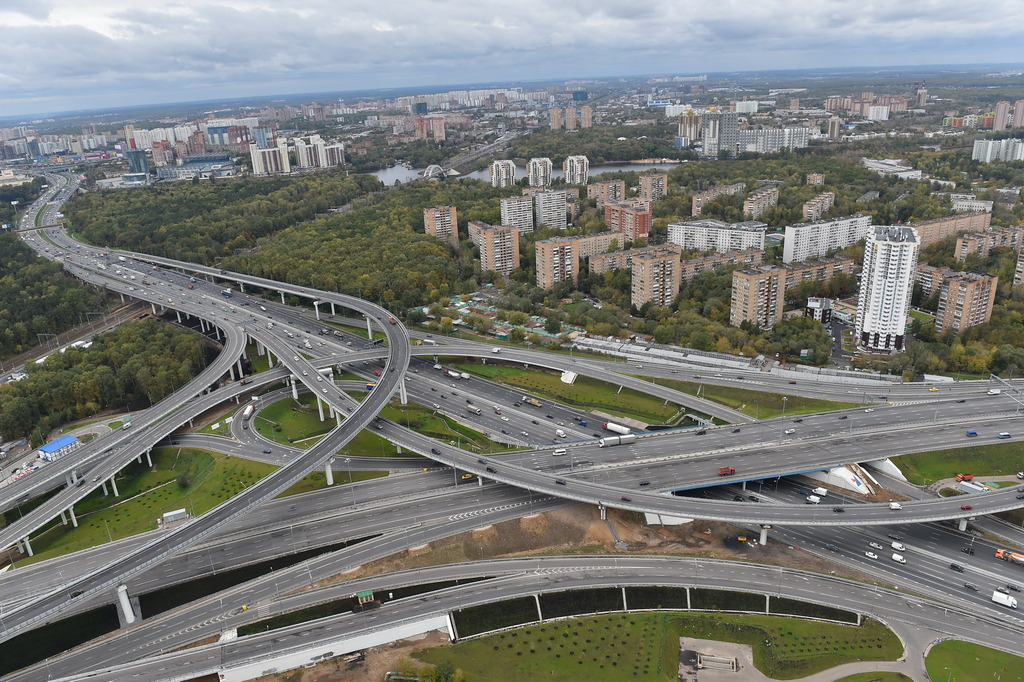
Interchange with Moscow–Saint Petersburg motorway

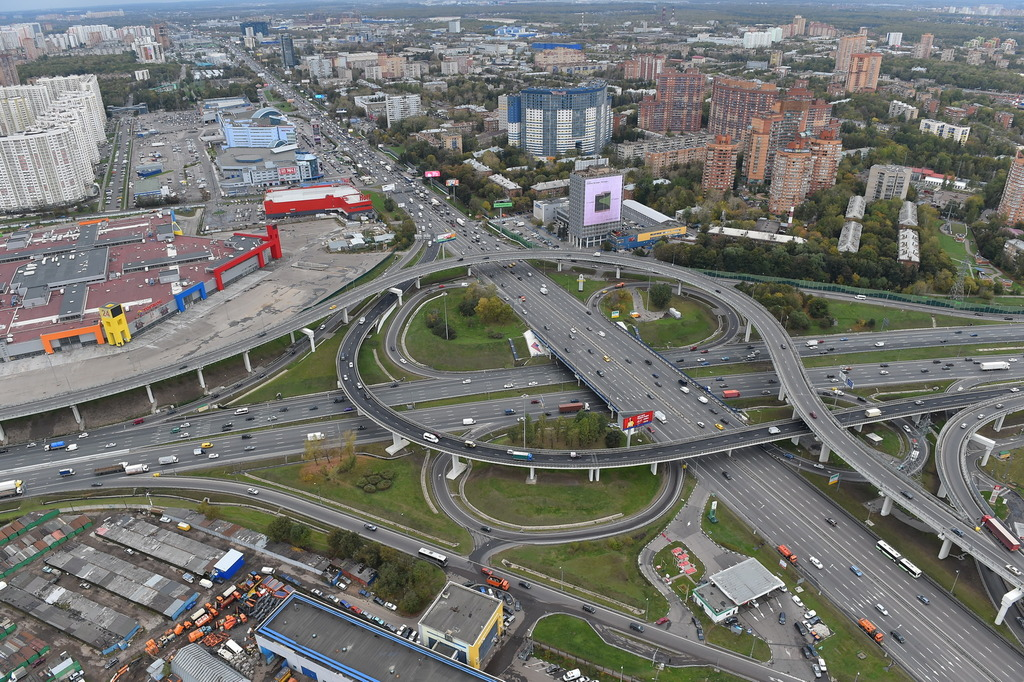
Interchange with Leningradskoye Highway

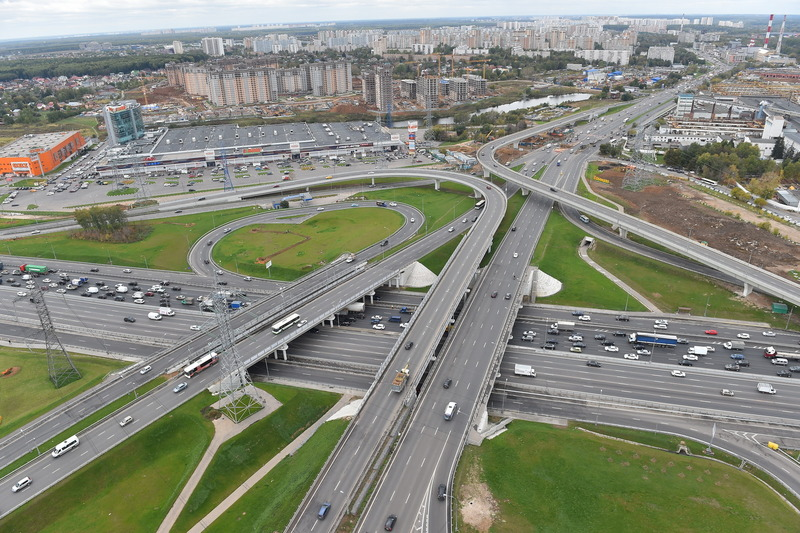
Interchange with Borovskoe shosse

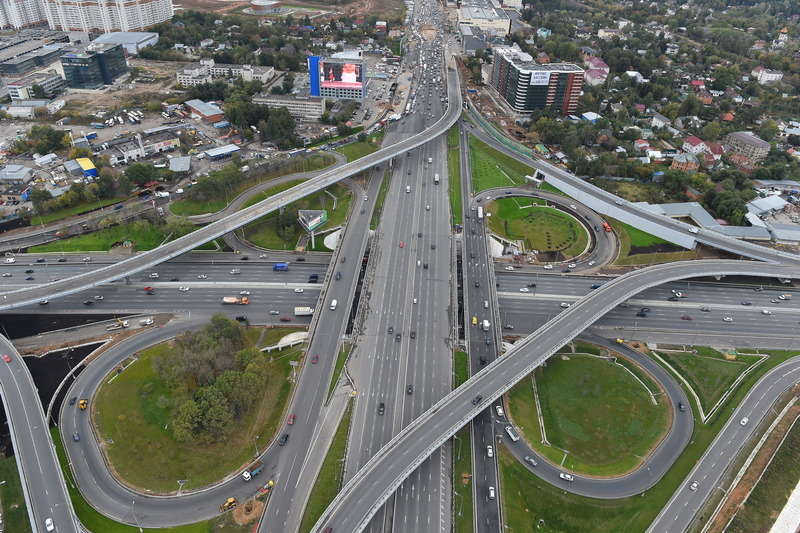
Interchange with Mozhayskoe shosse

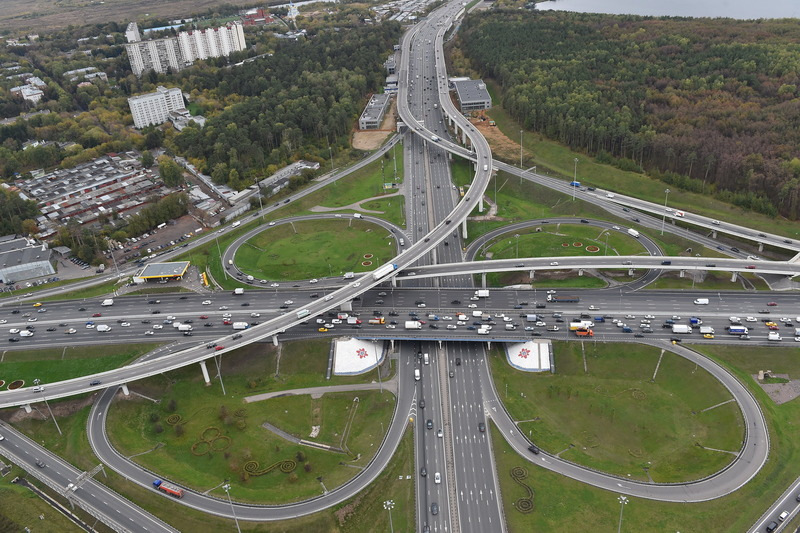
Interchange with Novorizhskoe shosse

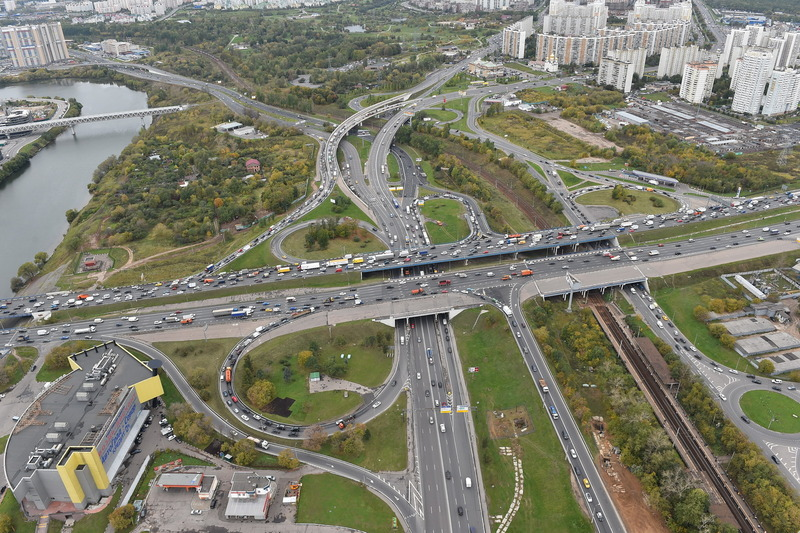
Interchange with Volokolamskoe shosse

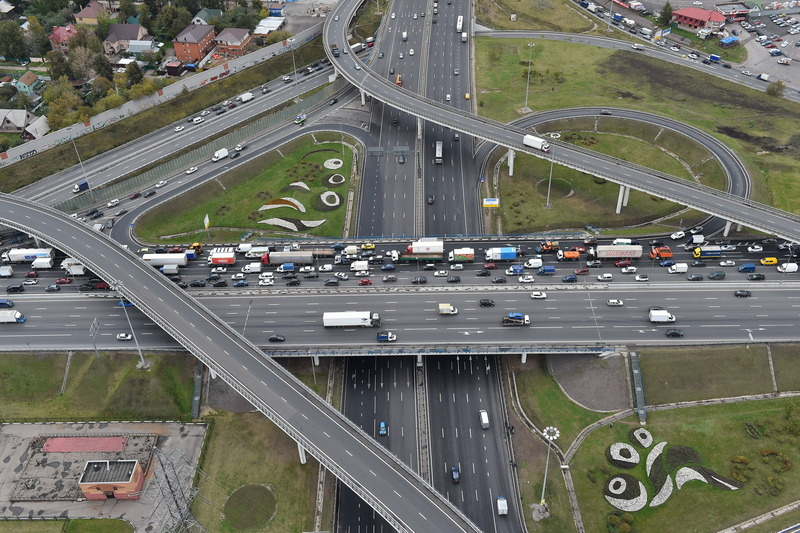
Interchange with Yaroslavskoe shosse

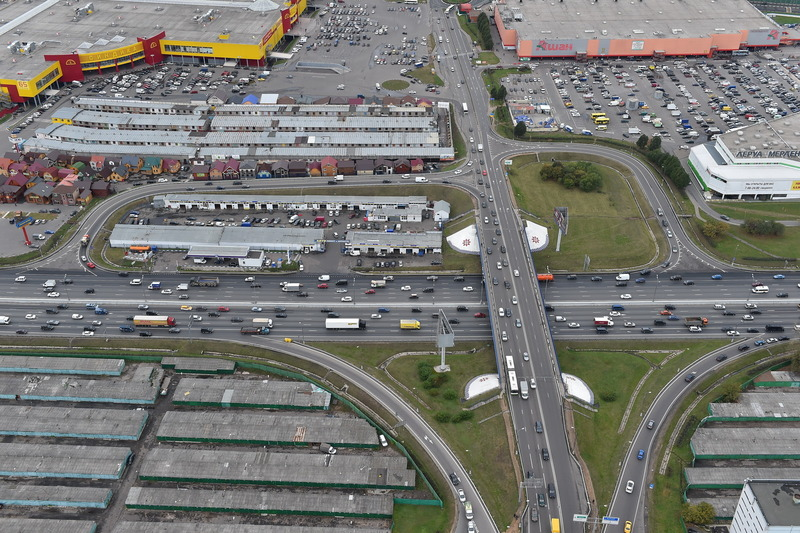
Interchange with Myakininsky proezd

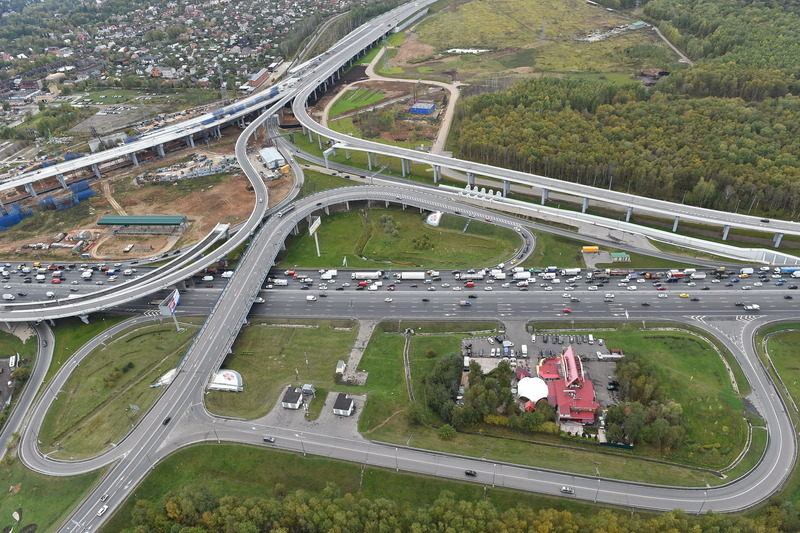
Interchange with Molodogvardeyskaya street

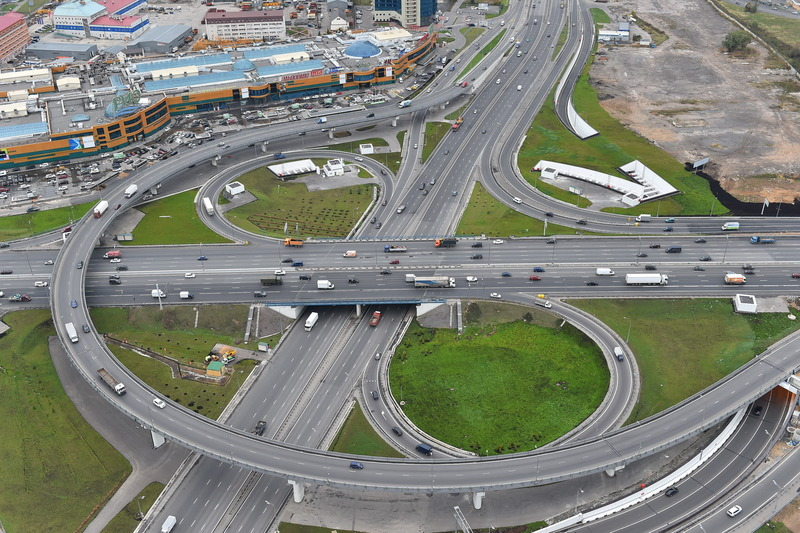
Interchange with Dmitrovskoe highway

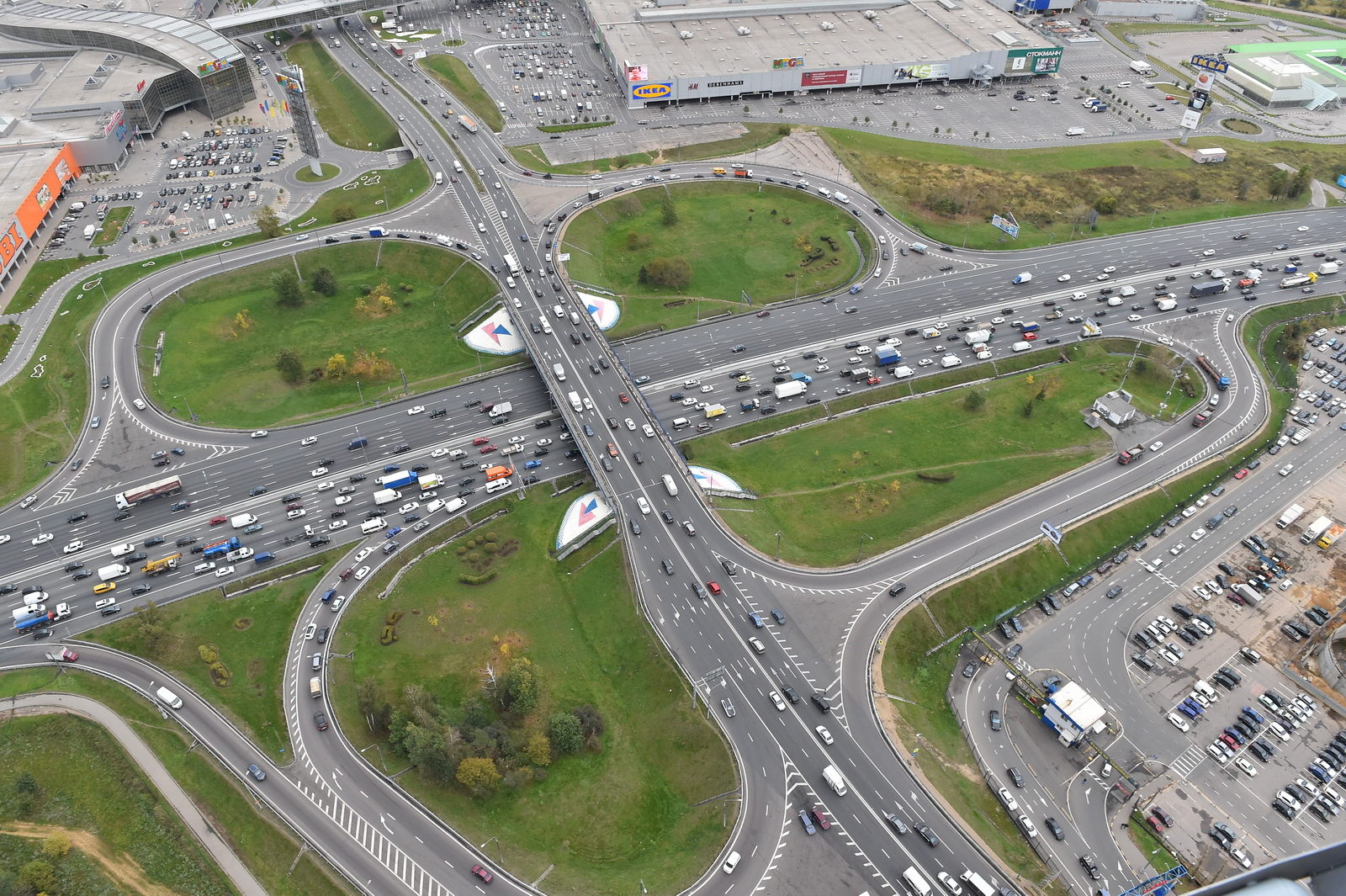
Interchange with Verkhniye polya street

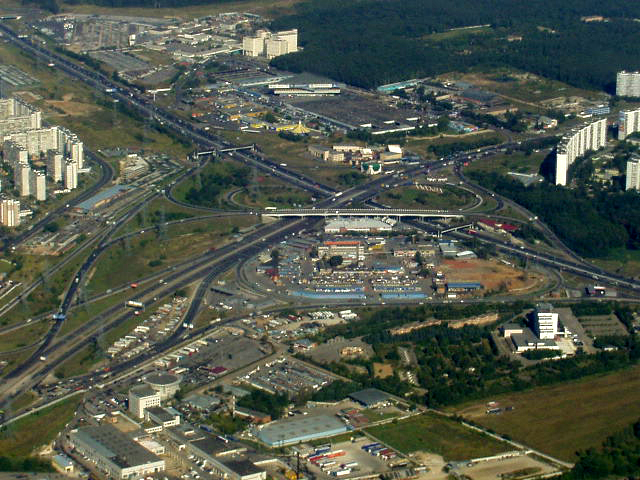
Interchange with M2

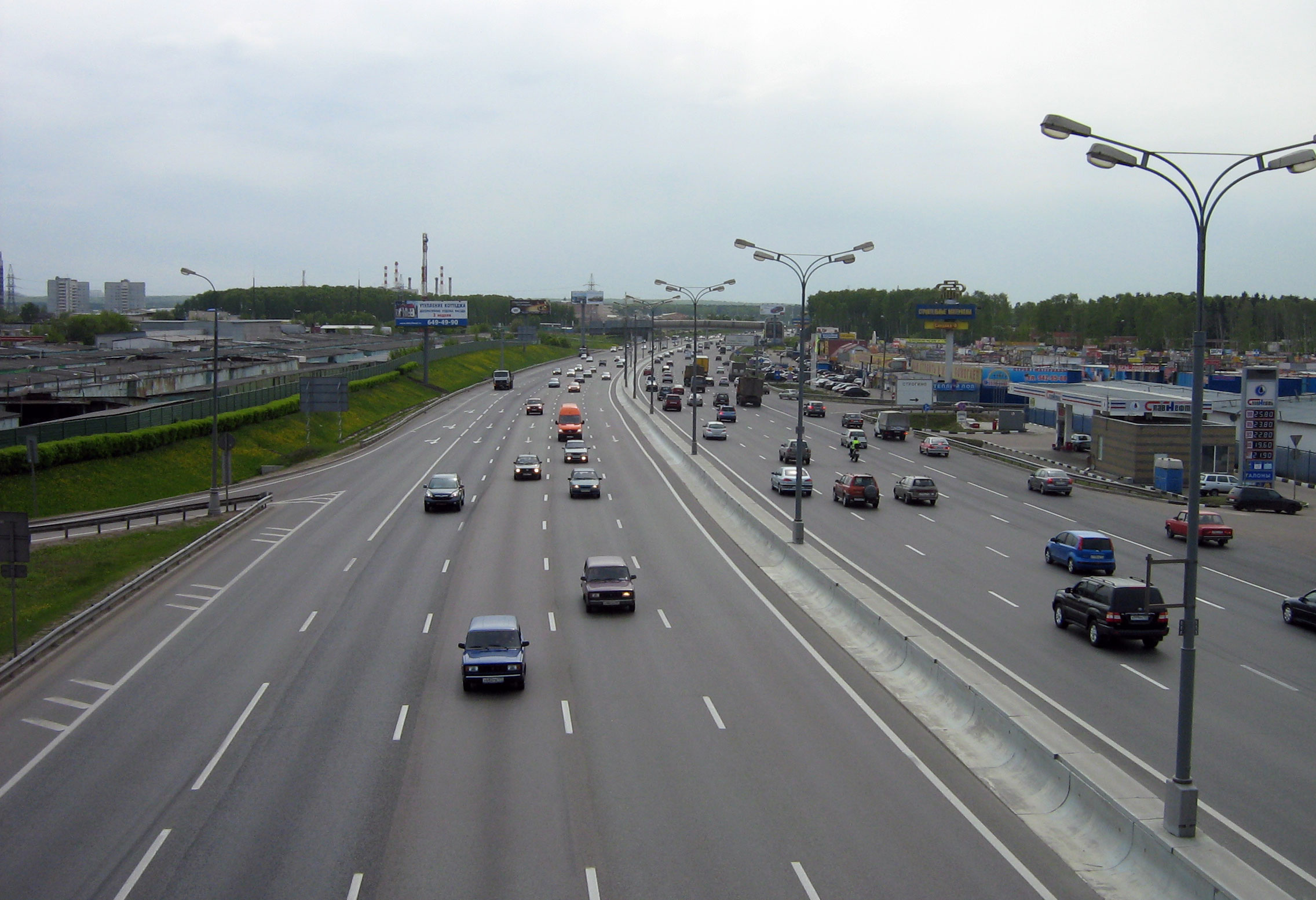
MKAD near Strogino District

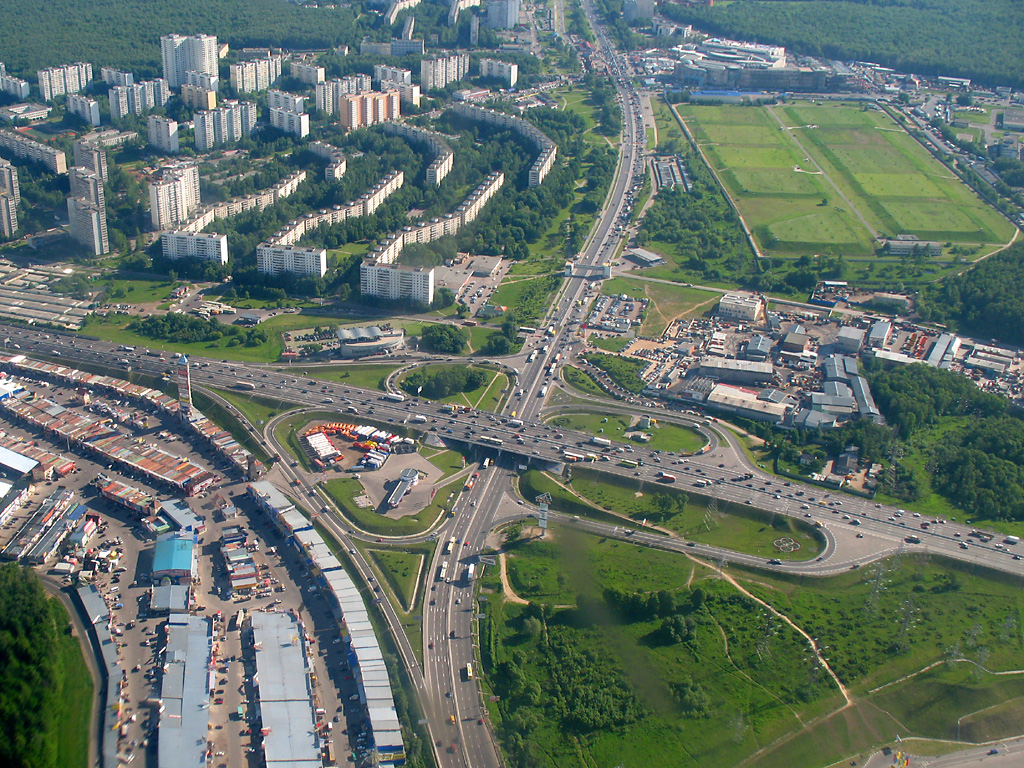
Interchange with Profsoyuznaya street/A-101 (Kaluzhskoe shosse)

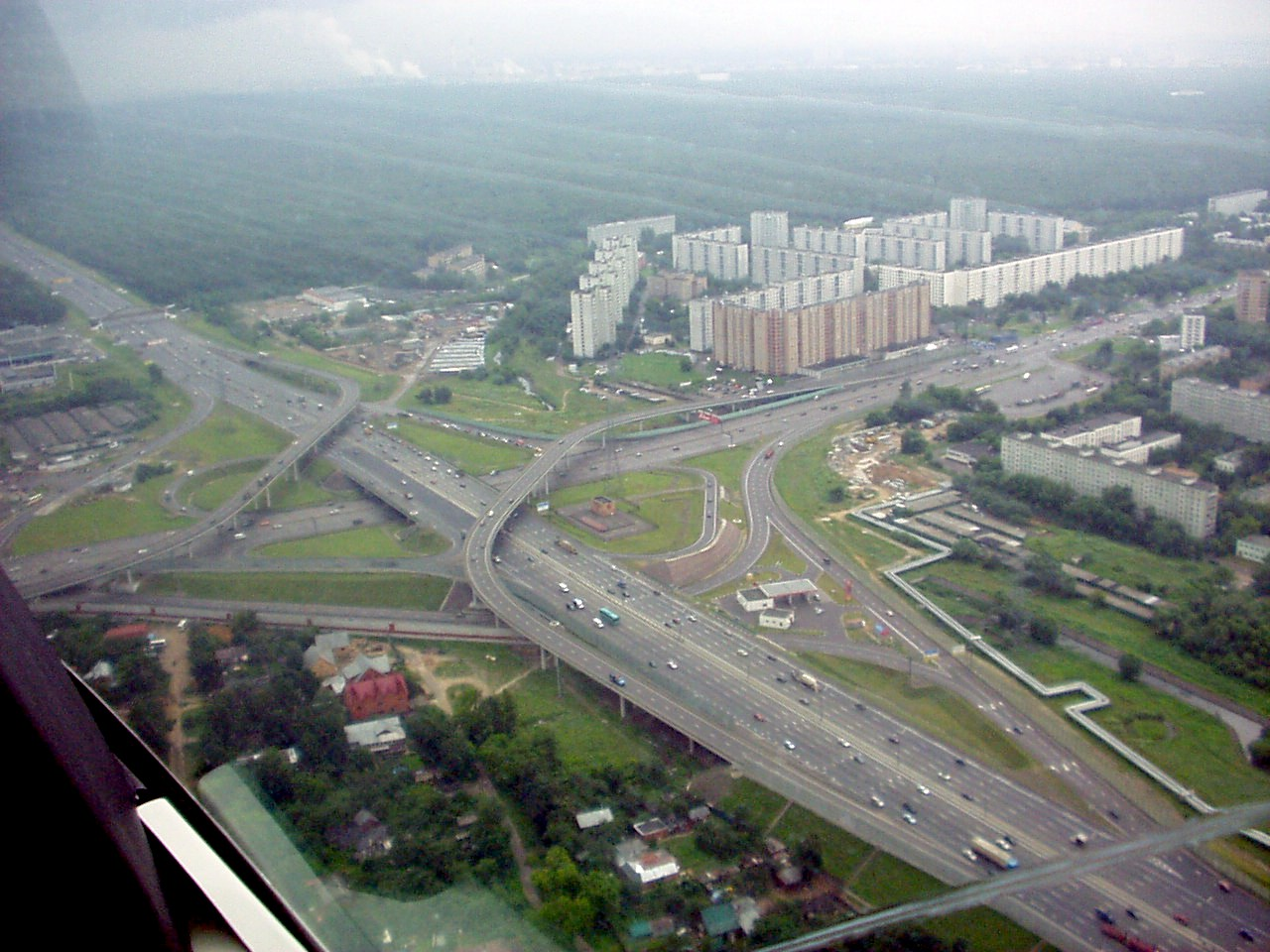
Yaroslavskoe highway interchange

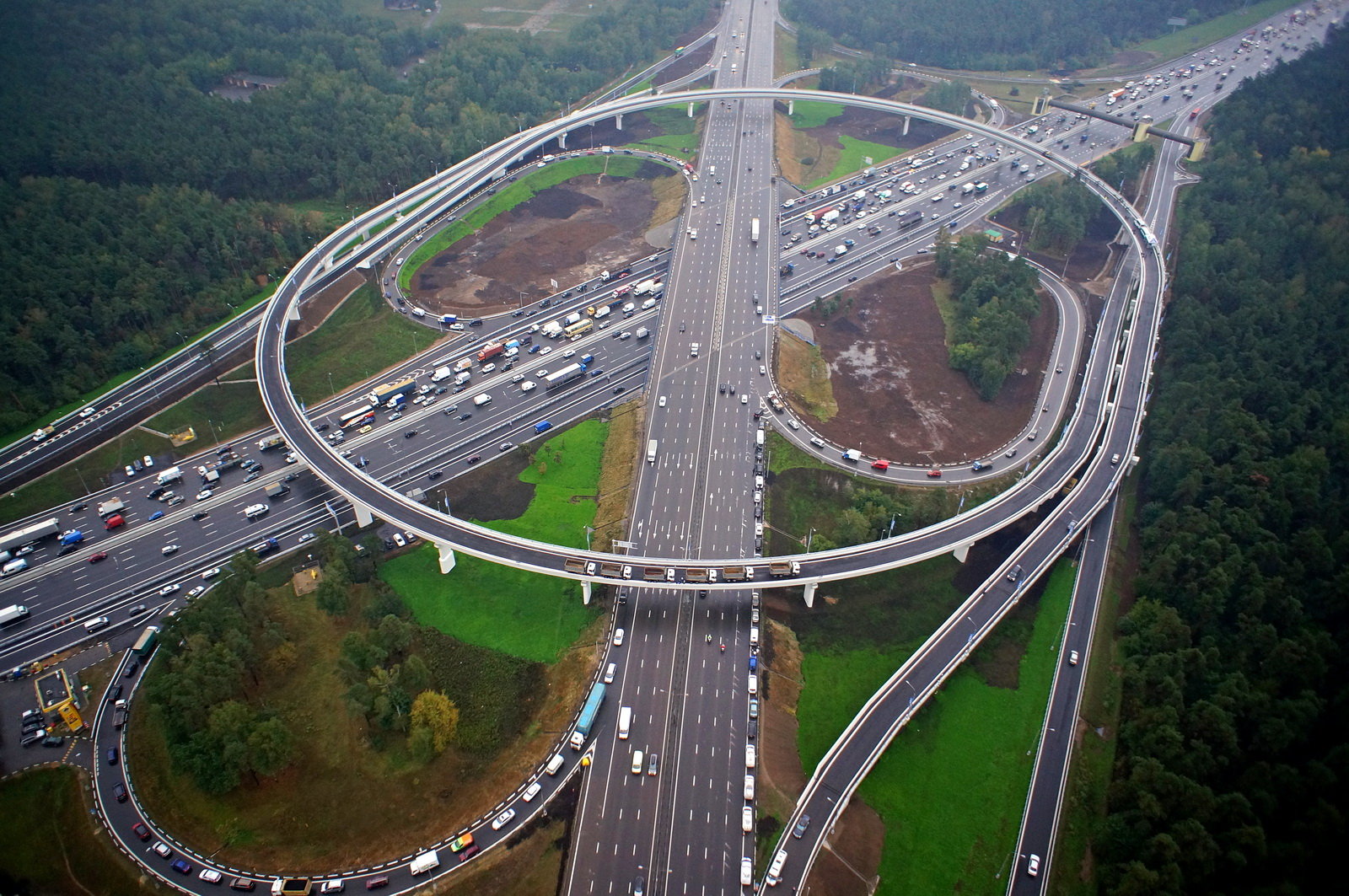
Interchange with Volgogradsky Prospekt in Moscow

== See also ==
Ring roads in Moscow:

- Boulevard Ring
- Garden Ring
- Third Ring Road
- Central Ring Road
