= Polevoy, Russia =

Polevoy (Russian: Полевой; masculine), Polevaya (Полевая; feminine), or Polevoye (Полевое; neuter) is the name of several rural localities in Russia.

== Modern localities ==
- Polevoy, Belgorod Oblast, a settlement in Novooskolsky District of Belgorod Oblast
- Polevoy, Republic of Buryatia, a settlement in Kabansky Selsoviet of Kabansky District in the Republic of Buryatia
- Polevoy, Chelyabinsk Oblast, a settlement in Voznesensky Selsoviet of Sosnovsky District in Chelyabinsk Oblast
- Polevoy, Kaliningrad Oblast, a settlement in Zalesovsky Rural Okrug of Polessky District in Kaliningrad Oblast
- Polevoy, Krasnodar Krai, a settlement in Parkovsky Rural Okrug of Tikhoretsky District in Krasnodar Krai; 45°48′N 40°16′E
- Polevoy, Lipetsk Oblast, a settlement in Dolgorukovsky Selsoviet of Dolgorukovsky District in Lipetsk Oblast; 52°18′N 38°24′E
- Polevoy, Magadan Oblast, a settlement in Yagodninsky District of Magadan Oblast; 62°47′N 148°48′E
- Polevoy, Bor, Nizhny Novgorod Oblast, a settlement in Krasnoslobodsky Selsoviet under the administrative jurisdiction of the town of oblast significance of Bor in Nizhny Novgorod Oblast
- Polevoy, Diveyevsky District, Nizhny Novgorod Oblast, a settlement in Satissky Selsoviet of Diveyevsky District in Nizhny Novgorod Oblast
- Polevoy, Lukoyanovsky District, Nizhny Novgorod Oblast, a settlement under the administrative jurisdiction of imeni Stepana Razina Work Settlement in Lukoyanovsky District of Nizhny Novgorod Oblast
- Polevoy, Dombarovsky District, Orenburg Oblast, a settlement in Polevoy Selsoviet of Dombarovsky District in Orenburg Oblast
- Polevoy, Svetlinsky District, Orenburg Oblast, a settlement in Sputnikovsky Selsoviet of Svetlinsky District in Orenburg Oblast
- Polevoy, Penza Oblast, a settlement in Kizhevatovsky Selsoviet of Bessonovsky District in Penza Oblast
- Polevoy, Rostov Oblast, a settlement in Verkhnesolenovskoye Rural Settlement of Vesyolovsky District in Rostov Oblast
- Polevoy, Ryazan Oblast, a settlement in Borkovsky Rural Okrug of Shilovsky District in Ryazan Oblast
- Polevoy, Stavropol Krai, a settlement in Prikalaussky Selsoviet of Petrovsky District in Stavropol Krai
- Polevoy, Sverdlovsk Oblast, a settlement in Patrushevsky Selsoviet of Sysertsky District in Sverdlovsk Oblast
- Polevoy, Kirsanovsky District, Tambov Oblast, a settlement in Sokolovsky Selsoviet of Kirsanovsky District in Tambov Oblast
- Polevoy, Morshansky District, Tambov Oblast, a settlement in Rakshinsky Selsoviet of Morshansky District in Tambov Oblast
- Polevoy, Pervomaysky District, Tambov Oblast, a settlement in Novoseslavinsky Selsoviet of Pervomaysky District in Tambov Oblast
- Polevoy, Tula Oblast, a settlement in Krasnopolsky Rural Okrug of Kimovsky District in Tula Oblast
- Polevoy, Tver Oblast, a settlement in Lukovnikovo Rural Settlement of Staritsky District in Tver Oblast
- Polevoy, Leninsky District, Volgograd Oblast, a settlement in Zaplavnensky Selsoviet of Leninsky District in Volgograd Oblast
- Polevoy, Novoanninsky District, Volgograd Oblast, a settlement in Polevoy Selsoviet of Novoanninsky District in Volgograd Oblast
- Polevoye, Altai Krai (or Polevoy, Polevaya), a selo in Polevskoy Selsoviet of Nemetsky National District in Altai Krai; 53°23′N 79°14′E
- Polevoye, Amur Oblast, a selo in Novoivanovsky Rural Settlement of Ivanovsky District in Amur Oblast
- Polevoye, Jewish Autonomous Oblast, a selo in Oktyabrsky District of the Jewish Autonomous Oblast
- Polevoye, Kaliningrad Oblast, a settlement in Novomoskovsky Rural Okrug of Guryevsky District in Kaliningrad Oblast
- Polevoye, Krasnoyarsk Krai, a selo in Polevskoy Selsoviet of Birilyussky District in Krasnoyarsk Krai
- Polevoye, Kurgan Oblast, a selo in Nizhnetobolny Selsoviet of Belozersky District in Kurgan Oblast; 55°49′N 65°24′E
- Polevoye, Kursk Oblast, a village in Vishnevsky Selsoviet of Shchigrovsky District in Kursk Oblast
- Polevoye, Primorsky Krai, a selo under the administrative jurisdiction of Lesozavodsk Town Under Krai Jurisdiction in Primorsky Krai
- Polevaya, Kostroma Oblast, a village in Samsonovskoye Settlement of Kostromskoy District in Kostroma Oblast; 57°41′N 40°50′E
- Polevaya, Kursk Oblast, a village in Polevskoy Selsoviet of Kursky District in Kursk Oblast
- Polevaya, Mari El Republic, a village in Obshiyarsky Rural Okrug of Volzhsky District in the Mari El Republic; 56°1′N 48°22′E
- Polevaya, Perm Krai, a village in Kungursky District of Perm Krai
- Polevaya, Tula Oblast, a village in Davydovsky Rural Okrug of Belyovsky District in Tula Oblast
- Polevaya, Tver Oblast, a village in Tsentralnoye Rural Settlement of Kimrsky District in Tver Oblast
- Polevaya, Vladimir Oblast, a village in Kovrovsky District of Vladimir Oblast

== Abolished localities ==
- Polevoy, Altai Krai, a settlement in Nizhnegusikhinsky Selsoviet of Ust-Pristansky District in Altai Krai; abolished in April 2013; 52°22′N 83°22′E

== Alternative names ==
- Polevoy and Polevoye, alternative names of Charlakta, a settlement in Tsagan-Nurskaya Rural Administration of Oktyabrsky District in the Republic of Kalmykia; 47°20′N 45°20′E
