= Poles in Buryatia =

Polish diaspora in Buryatia

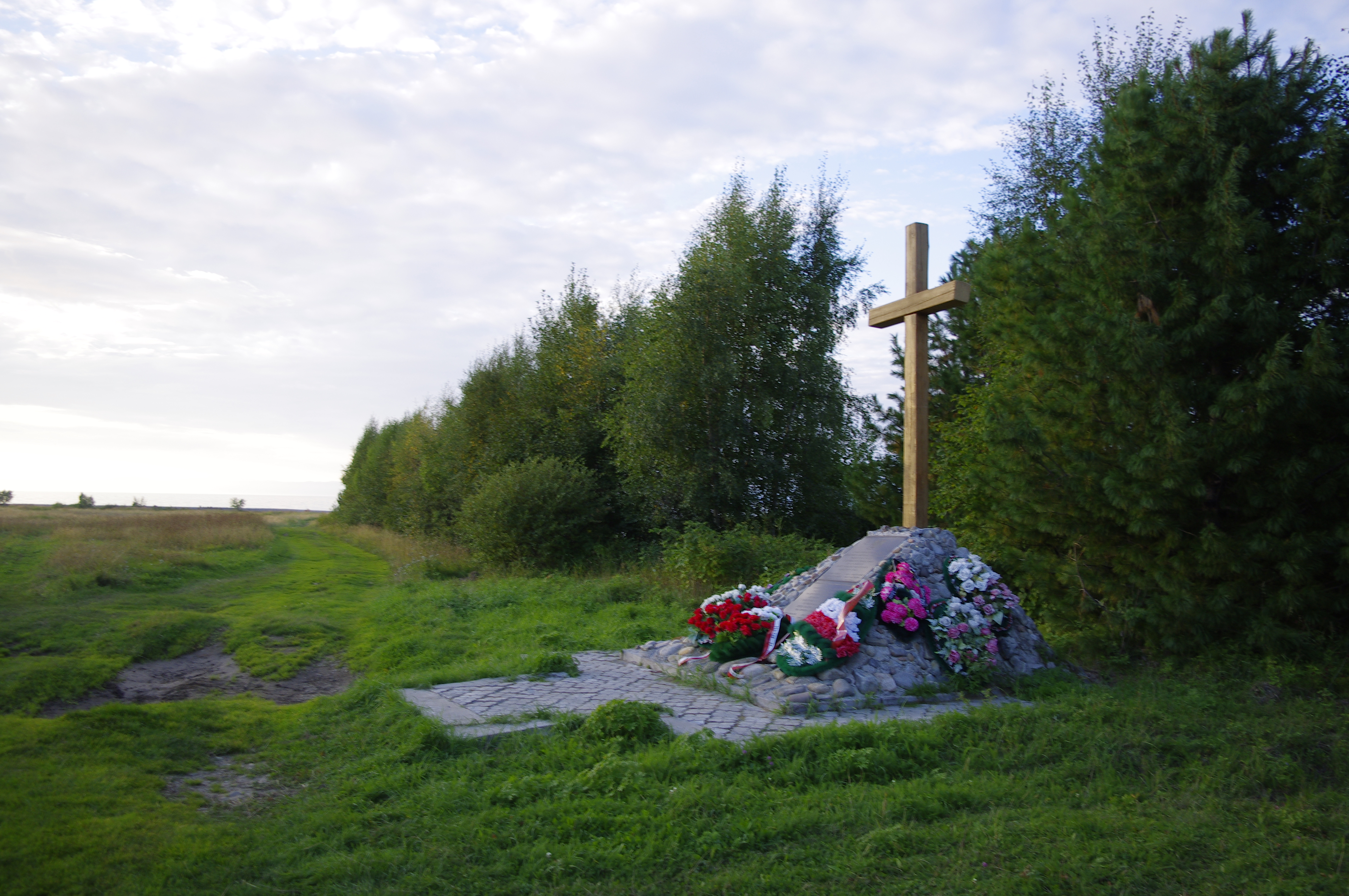
- Monument to Polish exiles, insurgents of the Baikal Insurrection, in Rechka Mishikha, before 2023 destruction

Total population
- 170 (2010, census)

Poles in Buryatia form part of the Polish diaspora in Siberia. Polish presence in Buryatia dates back over 300 years.

== History ==
Historical population
Year	Pop.	±%
1926	1,241	—
1939	726	−41.5%
1959	391	−46.1%
1970	363	−7.2%
1979	388	+6.9%
1989	894	+130.4%
2002	249	−72.1%
2010	170	−31.7%

One of the first Poles in Buryatia was Nicefor Czernichowski. In 1764, nine either Poles or people of Polish descent was registered in Udinsk. Following the Partitions of Poland, Russia deported many Poles, political prisoners, members of the secret Polish resistance and insurgents, as well as ordinary criminals, to katorga in Siberia, including Buryatia. In 1859–1862, exiled Aleksander Zenowicz, was the mayor of Kyakhta.

The Polish Baikal Insurrection of 1866 also took place in Buryatia. Polish insurgents disarmed Russian convoys at Vydrino, Pereyomnaya and Mishikha, and then gathered in Mysovsk, before they clashed with Russian troops at Mishikha on 28 June 1866. One of the leaders of the insurrection, Leopold Eljaszewicz, still lived near Verkhneudinsk as of 1883.

Some Poles came to Buryatia voluntarily, including physician Julian Talko-Hryncewicz, who settled in Kyakhta and also conducted ethnographic and archeological work in the region. The exiled Włodzimierz Zalewski was a city councillor of Verkhneudinsk in 1906–1908, and was one of the initiators of the construction of a Catholic church in Verkhneudinsk, the sole such church in Buryatia. The church was consecrated in 1909, and Poles served as the first parish priests. Sizeable Polish communities were founded in Mysovsk, Tankhoi and Vydrino along the Trans-Siberian Railway. Polish exiles also popularized playing the piano in Buryatia.

In the 1920s, most Poles left Buryatia for Poland, which just regained independence after World War I. According to the 1926 Soviet census, there were 1,241 Poles in the Buryat-Mongol Autonomous Soviet Socialist Republic, constituting the seventh largest ethnic group of the republic. In 1937–1938, remaining Poles were, like in other parts of the USSR, targeted by the Polish Operation of the NKVD.

== Culture ==
The main cultural organization of Poles in Buryatia is the National and Cultural Autonomy of Poles "Hope", based in Ulan-Ude, founded in 1993. In 1996 it started publishing a Polish magazine Polaki w Burjatii in Ulan-Ude.

The Polish exiles, insurgents of the Baikal Insurrection of 1866, were commemorated with a memorial in Rechka Mishikha in 2000, which was destroyed in 2023.

The Museum of History of Buryatia in Ulan-Ude contains works of Polish painter and exile to Siberia Leopold Niemirowski.

== Bibliography ==
- Siemionow, Jewgienij W. (2015). "Polacy w Buriacji – historia i współczesność". Niepodległość i Pamięć (in Polish) (2 (50)). Muzeum Niepodległości w Warszawie. ISSN 1427-1443.
