= Dubinino =

Dubinino (Russian: Дуби́нино) is the name of several inhabited localities in Russia.

Urban localities

- Dubinino, Sharypovo, Krasnoyarsk Krai, a work settlement under the administrative jurisdiction of the krai town of Sharypovo, Krasnoyarsk Krai

Rural localities

- Dubinino, Republic of Bashkortostan, a selo in Inzersky Selsoviet of Beloretsky District of the Republic of Bashkortostan
- Dubinino, Republic of Buryatia, a selo in Oymursky Selsoviet of Kabansky District of the Republic of Buryatia
- Dubinino, Kaluga Oblast, a village in Dzerzhinsky District of Kaluga Oblast
- Dubinino, Sharypovsky District, Krasnoyarsk Krai, a selo in Rodnikovsky Selsoviet of Sharypovsky District of Krasnoyarsk Krai
- Dubinino, Leningrad Oblast, a logging depot settlement under the administrative jurisdiction of Kamennogorskoye Settlement Municipal Formation, Vyborgsky District, Leningrad Oblast
- Dubinino, Lipetsk Oblast, a village in Vyazovsky Selsoviet of Lebedyansky District of Lipetsk Oblast
- Dubinino, Chekhovsky District, Moscow Oblast, a village in Lyubuchanskoye Rural Settlement of Chekhovsky District of Moscow Oblast
- Dubinino, Solnechnogorsky District, Moscow Oblast, a village under the administrative jurisdiction of the Town of Solnechnogorsk, Solnechnogorsky District, Moscow Oblast
- Dubinino, Loknyansky District, Pskov Oblast, a village in Loknyansky District, Pskov Oblast
- Dubinino, Nevelsky District, Pskov Oblast, a village in Nevelsky District, Pskov Oblast
- Dubinino, Akatovskoye Rural Settlement, Gagarinsky District, Smolensk Oblast, a village in Akatovskoye Rural Settlement of Gagarinsky District of Smolensk Oblast
- Dubinino, Yelninskoye Rural Settlement, Gagarinsky District, Smolensk Oblast, a village in Yelninskoye Rural Settlement of Gagarinsky District of Smolensk Oblast
- Dubinino, Tver Oblast, a village in Toropetsky District of Tver Oblast
- Dubinino, Vologda Oblast, a village in Saninsky Selsoviet of Babayevsky District of Vologda Oblast
