= Khrestivka urban hromada =

Khrestivka urban hromada Хрестівська міська громада
- Hromada
- Interactive map of Khrestivka urban hromada
- Country: Ukraine
- Oblast: Donetsk
- Raion: Horlivka
- Settlements: 22
- Cities: 1
- Rural settlements: 5
- Villages: 16

Khrestivka urban hromada (Ukrainian: Хрестівська міська громада) is a hromada of Ukraine, located in Horlivka Raion, Donetsk Oblast. Its administrative center is the city Khrestivka.

The hromada contains 7 settlements, 1 city (Khrestivka), 16 villages:

- Vesele
- Vidrodzhenya
- Komyshatka
- Krasnyi Luh
- Kruhlyk
- Maloorlivka
- Myxailivka
- Nikishyne
- Novoorlivka
- Orlovo-Ivanivka
- Petropavlivka
- Rozsypne
- Stizhkove
- Stryukove
- Tymofiyivka
- Shevchenko

And 5 rural-type settlements: Kumshatske, Polove, Ridkodub, Slavne, and Stepne.

== See also ==
- List of hromadas of Ukraine
