= Polevoy =

Polevoy (masculine), Polevaya (feminine), or Polevoye (neuter) may refer to:

- Polevoy (surname) (or Polevaya), Russian last name
- Polevoy, Russia (Polevaya, Polevoye), several rural localities in Russia
- Polevaya Street, a street in the urban-type settlement of Aliskerovo in Chukotka Autonomous Okrug, Russia
- Polyove, Shakhtarsk Raion, Donetsk Oblast (Polevoye), a settlement in Donetsk Oblast, Ukraine
