= Istomino =

Istomino Истомино
- Selo
- Location within Republic of Buryatia Location within Russia
- Coordinates: 52°08′N 106°18′E
- Country: Russia
- Region: Republic of Buryatia
- District: Kabansky District
- Time zone: UTC+8:00

Istomino (Russian: Истомино) is a rural locality (a selo) in Kabansky District, Republic of Buryatia, Russia. The population was 277 as of 2010. There are 8 streets.

== Geography ==
Istomino is located 34 km northwest of Kabansk (the district's administrative centre) by road. Stepnoy Dvorets is the nearest rural locality.
