= Dulan, Republic of Buryatia =

Dulan Дулан
- Selo
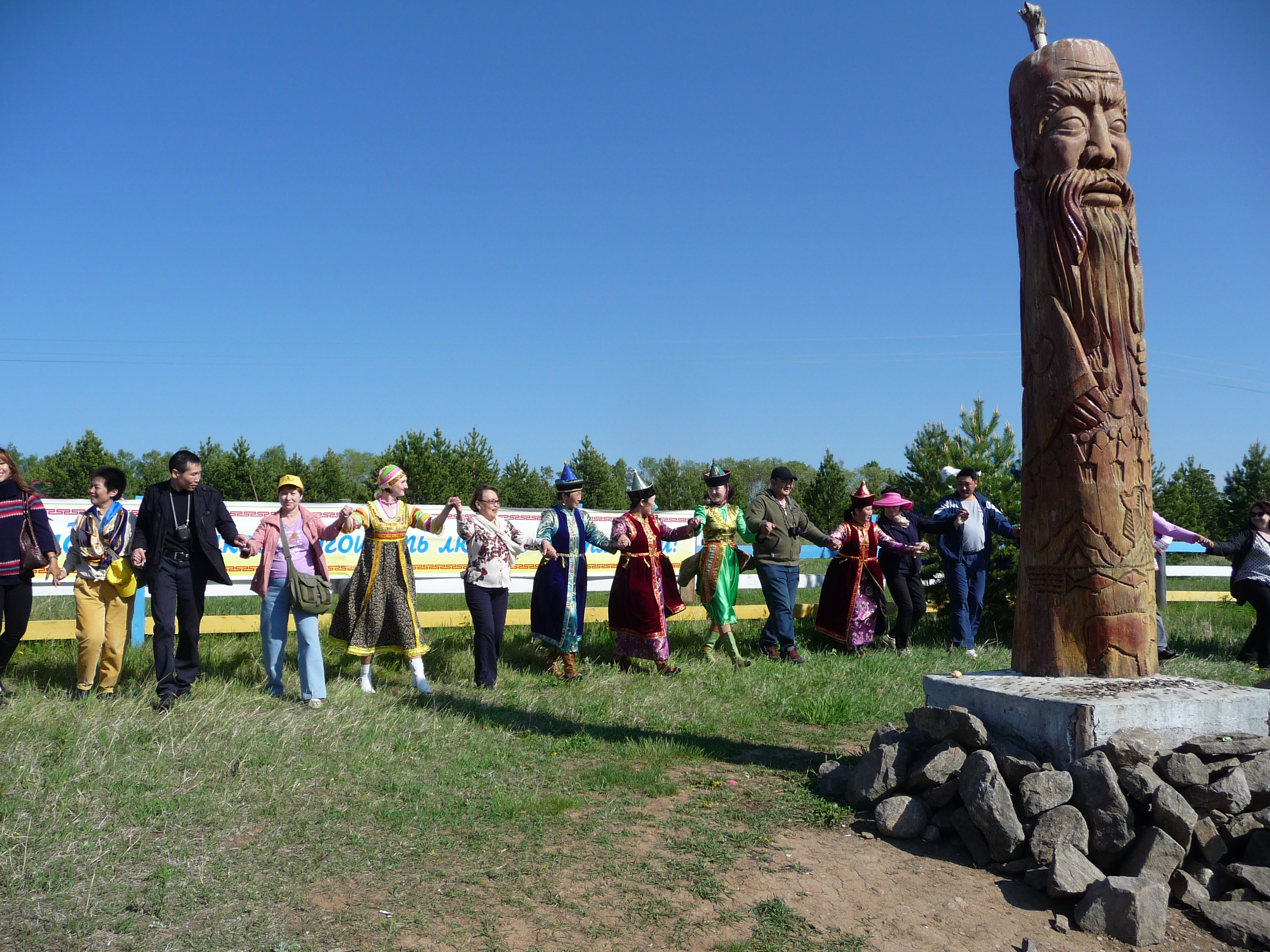

- Location within Republic of Buryatia Location within Russia
- Coordinates: 52°22′N 106°52′E
- Country: Russia
- Region: Republic of Buryatia
- District: Kabansky District
- Time zone: UTC+8:00

Dulan (Russian: Дулан; Buryat: Дулаан, Dulaan) is a rural locality (a selo) in Kabansky District, Republic of Buryatia, Russia. The population was 132 as of 2010. There are 9 streets.

== Geography ==
Dulan is located 69 km north of Kabansk (the district's administrative centre) by road. Oymur is the nearest rural locality.
