= Posolskaya =

Posolskaya Посольская
- Settlement
- Location within Republic of Buryatia Location within Russia
- Coordinates: 51°58′N 106°20′E
- Country: Russia
- Region: Republic of Buryatia
- District: Kabansky District
- Time zone: UTC+8:00

Posolskaya (Russian: Посольская) is a rural locality (a settlement) in Kabansky District, Republic of Buryatia, Russia. The population was 785 as of 2010. There are 11 streets.

== Geography ==
Posolskaya is located 25 km southwest of Kabansk (the district's administrative centre) by road. Bolshaya Rechka is the nearest rural locality.
