= Murzino, Republic of Buryatia =

Murzino Мурзино
- Selo
- Location within Republic of Buryatia Location within Russia
- Coordinates: 52°11′N 106°29′E
- Country: Russia
- Region: Republic of Buryatia
- District: Kabansky District
- Time zone: UTC+8:00

Murzino (Russian: Мурзино) is a rural locality (a selo) in Kabansky District, Republic of Buryatia, Russia. The population was 48 as of 2010. There is 1 street.

== Geography ==
Murzino is located 20 km northwest of Kabansk (the district's administrative centre) by road. Shigayevo is the nearest rural locality.
