= Nyuki =

Nyuki Нюки
- Selo
- Location within Republic of Buryatia Location within Russia
- Coordinates: 52°01′N 106°42′E
- Country: Russia
- Region: Republic of Buryatia
- District: Kabansky District
- Time zone: UTC+8:00

Nyuki (Russian: Нюки) is a rural locality (a selo) in Kabansky District, Republic of Buryatia, Russia. The population was 249 as of 2010. There are 4 streets.

== Geography ==
Nyuki is located 5 km southeast of Kabansk (the district's administrative centre) by road. Kabansk is the nearest rural locality.
