= Sukhaya, Kabansky District, Republic of Buryatia =

Sukhaya Сухая
- Selo
- Location within Republic of Buryatia Location within Russia
- Coordinates: 52°32′N 107°06′E
- Country: Russia
- Region: Republic of Buryatia
- District: Kabansky District
- Time zone: UTC+8:00

Sukhaya (Russian: Сухая) is a rural locality (a selo) in Kabansky District, Republic of Buryatia, Russia. The population was 550 as of 2010. There are 32 streets.

== Geography ==
Sukhaya is located 95 km northeast of Kabansk (the district's administrative centre) by road. Zarechye is the nearest rural locality.
