= Maloye Kolesovo =

Maloye Kolesovo Малое Колесово
- Selo
- Location within Republic of Buryatia Location within Russia
- Coordinates: 52°07′N 106°32′E
- Country: Russia
- Region: Republic of Buryatia
- District: Kabansky District
- Time zone: UTC+8:00

Maloye Kolesovo (Russian: Малое Колесово) is a rural locality (a selo) in Kabansky District, Republic of Buryatia, Russia. The population was 213 as of 2010. There are 3 streets.

== Geography ==
Maloye Kolesovo is located 12 km (7.5 mi) northwest of Kabansk (the district's administrative centre) by road. Bolshoye Kolesovo is the nearest rural locality.
