= Treskovo =

Treskovo Тресково
- Selo
- Location within Republic of Buryatia Location within Russia
- Coordinates: 52°03′N 106°54′E
- Country: Russia
- Region: Republic of Buryatia
- District: Kabansky District
- Time zone: UTC+8:00

Treskovo (Russian: Тресково) is a rural locality (a selo) in Kabansky District, Republic of Buryatia, Russia. The population was 1,380 as of 2010. There are 18 streets.

== Geography ==
Treskovo is located 22 km east of Kabansk (the district's administrative centre) by road. Selenga is the nearest rural locality.
