= Inkino =

Inkino Инкино
- Selo
- Location within Republic of Buryatia Location within Russia
- Coordinates: 52°16′N 106°43′E
- Country: Russia
- Region: Republic of Buryatia
- District: Kabansky District
- Time zone: UTC+8:00

Inkino (Russian: Инкино) is a rural locality (a selo) in Kabansky District, Republic of Buryatia, Russia. The population was 93 as of 2010. There are 2 streets.

== Geography ==
Inkino is located 54 km northeast of Kabansk (the district's administrative centre) by road. Dubinino is the nearest rural locality.
