= Manturikha =

Manturikha Мантуриха
- Settlement
- Location within Republic of Buryatia Location within Russia
- Coordinates: 51°46′N 105°58′E
- Country: Russia
- Region: Republic of Buryatia
- District: Kabansky District
- Time zone: UTC+8:00

Manturikha (Russian: Мантуриха) is a rural locality (a settlement) in Kabansky District, Republic of Buryatia, Russia. The population was 84 as of 2010. There are 11 streets.

== Geography ==
Manturikha is located 61 km southwest of Kabansk (the district's administrative centre) by road. Boyarsky is the nearest rural locality.
