= Khandala, Republic of Buryatia =

Khandala Хандала
- Ulus
- Location within Republic of Buryatia Location within Russia
- Coordinates: 52°06′N 106°42′E
- Country: Russia
- Region: Republic of Buryatia
- District: Kabansky District
- Time zone: UTC+8:00

Khandala (Russian: Хандала) is a rural locality (an ulus) in Kabansky District, Republic of Buryatia, Russia. The population was 287 as of 2010. There are 6 streets.

== Geography ==
Khandala is located 35 km northeast of Kabansk (the district's administrative centre) by road. Shergino is the nearest rural locality.
