= Ranzhurovo =

Ranzhurovo Ранжурово
- Selo
- Location within Republic of Buryatia Location within Russia
- Coordinates: 52°10′N 106°25′E
- Country: Russia
- Region: Republic of Buryatia
- District: Kabansky District
- Time zone: UTC+8:00

Ranzhurovo (Russian: Ранжурово) is a rural locality (a selo) in Kabansky District, Republic of Buryatia, Russia. The population was 464 as of 2010. There are 6 streets.

== Geography ==
Ranzhurovo is located 24 km northwest of Kabansk (the district's administrative centre) by road. Stepnoy Dvorets is the nearest rural locality.
