= Rechka Vydrino =

Rechka Vydrino Речка Выдрино
- Settlement
- Location within Republic of Buryatia Location within Russia
- Coordinates: 51°29′N 104°50′E
- Country: Russia
- Region: Republic of Buryatia
- District: Kabansky District
- Time zone: UTC+8:00

Rechka Vydrino (Russian: Речка Выдрино) is a rural locality (a settlement) in Kabansky District, Republic of Buryatia, Russia. The population was 8 as of 2010. There are 2 streets.

== Geography ==
Rechka Vydrino is located 149 km southwest of Kabansk (the district's administrative centre) by road. Kedrovaya is the nearest rural locality.
