= Bryansk, Republic of Buryatia =

Bryansk Брянск
- Selo
- Location within Republic of Buryatia Location within Russia
- Coordinates: 52°02′N 106°52′E
- Country: Russia
- Region: Republic of Buryatia
- District: Kabansky District
- Time zone: UTC+8:00

Bryansk (Russian: Брянск) is a rural locality (a selo) in Kabansky District, Republic of Buryatia, Russia. The population was 1,075 as of 2010. There are 12 streets.

== Geography ==
Bryansk is located 17 km (11 mi) southeast of Kabansk (the district's administrative centre) by road. Selenga is the nearest rural locality.
