= Timlyuy =

Timlyuy Тимлюй
- Selo
- Location within Republic of Buryatia Location within Russia
- Coordinates: 51°58′N 106°34′E
- Country: Russia
- Region: Republic of Buryatia
- District: Kabansky District
- Time zone: UTC+8:00

Timlyuy (Russian: Тимлюй) is a rural locality (a selo) in Kabansky District, Republic of Buryatia, Russia. The population was 730 as of 2010. There are 10 streets.

== Geography ==
Timlyuy is located 11 km southwest of Kabansk (the district's administrative centre) by road. Kamensk is the nearest rural locality.
