= Kedrovy (inhabited locality) =

Kedrovy (Russian: Кедровый; masculine), Kedrovaya (Кедровая; feminine), or Kedrovoye (Кедровое; neuter) is the name of several inhabited localities in Russia.

Urban localities

- Kedrovy, Tomsk Oblast, a town in Tomsk Oblast
- Kedrovy, Yemelyanovsky District, Krasnoyarsk Krai, a settlement in Yemelyanovsky District, Krasnoyarsk Krai

Rural localities

- Kedrovy, Chelyabinsk Oblast, a settlement in Kurginsky Selsoviet of Nyazepetrovsky District of Chelyabinsk Oblast
- Kedrovy, Chunsky District, Irkutsk Oblast, a settlement in Chunsky District, Irkutsk Oblast
- Kedrovy, Ust-Ilimsky District, Irkutsk Oblast, a settlement in Ust-Ilimsky District, Irkutsk Oblast
- Kedrovy, Kemerovo Oblast, a settlement under the administrative jurisdiction of the city of oblast significance of Tayga, Kemerovo Oblast
- Kedrovy, Khanty-Mansi Autonomous Okrug, a settlement in Khanty-Mansiysky District of Khanty-Mansi Autonomous Okrug
- Kedrovy, Beryozovsky District, Krasnoyarsk Krai, a settlement in Yesaulsky Selsoviet of Beryozovsky District of Krasnoyarsk Krai
- Kedrovy, Kozulsky District, Krasnoyarsk Krai, a settlement under the administrative jurisdiction of the work settlement of Kozulka, Kozulsky District, Krasnoyarsk Krai
- Kedrovy, Nizhneingashsky District, Krasnoyarsk Krai, a settlement under the administrative jurisdiction of the work settlement of Pokanayevka, Nizhneingashsky District, Krasnoyarsk Krai
- Kedrovy, Magadan Oblast, a settlement in Susumansky District of Magadan Oblast
- Kedrovy, Omsk Oblast, a settlement in Imshegalsky Rural Okrug of Tarsky District of Omsk Oblast
- Kedrovy, Primorsky Krai, a railway station in Khasansky District of Primorsky Krai
- Kedrovaya, Republic of Buryatia, a settlement at the station in Tankhoysky Selsoviet of Kabansky District, Republic of Buryatia
- Kedrovaya, Krasnoyarsk Krai, a village in Tubinsky Selsoviet of Krasnoturansky District of Krasnoyarsk Krai

== See also ==
- Kedrovy Urban Okrug
