= Vydrino (selo) =

Vydrino Выдрино
- Selo
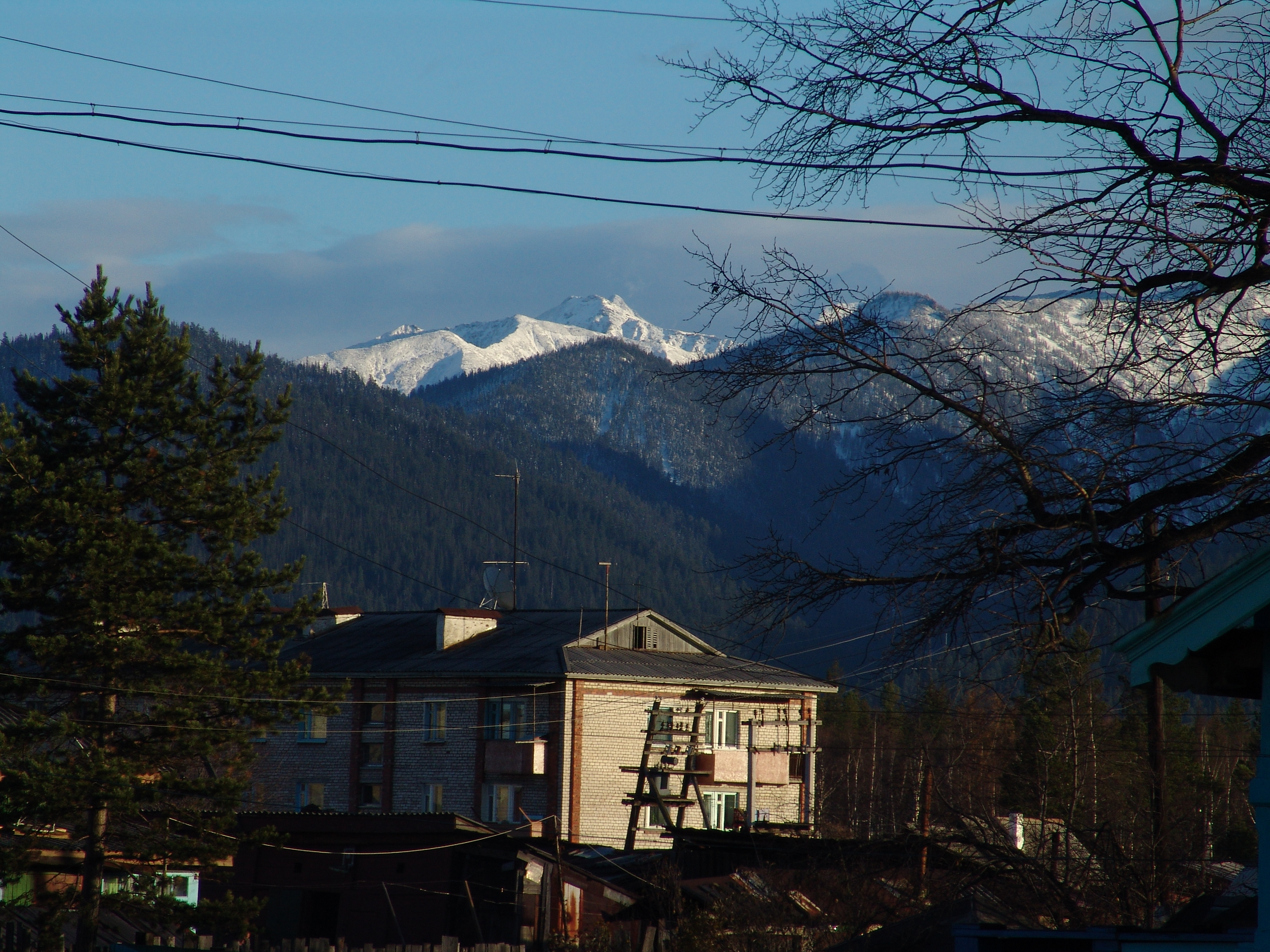
- Picture of a house behind a Mountain

- Location within Republic of Buryatia Location within Russia
- Coordinates: 51°27′N 104°38′E
- Country: Russia
- Region: Republic of Buryatia
- District: Kabansky District
- Time zone: UTC+8:00

Vydrino (Russian: Выдрино) is a rural locality (a selo) in Kabansky District, Republic of Buryatia, Russia. The population was 4,374 as of 2010. There are 22 streets.

== Geography ==
Vydrino is located 167 km southwest of Kabansk (the district's administrative centre) by road. Novosnezhnaya is the nearest rural locality.
