= Baikal Insurrection =

1886 Polish civil uprising

Date	24–28 June 1866
Location	Siberia, Russian Empire
Result	Russian victory

Belligerents
Russian Empire	Siberian Legion of Free Poles

Commanders and leaders
Unknown	Narcyz Celiński (POW); Gustaw Szaramowicz (POW)

Strength
Several thousand	Around 700

Casualties and losses
Unknown	300 dead, rest taken prisoner

The Baikal Insurrection (Polish: Powstanie zabajkalskie or Powstanie nad Bajkałem; Russian: Кругобайкальское восстание), also known as the Siberian Uprising, was a short-lived uprising of about 700 Polish political prisoners and exiles (Sybiracy) in Siberia, Russian Empire, that started on 24 June 1866 and lasted for a few days, until their defeat on 28 June.

== Background ==
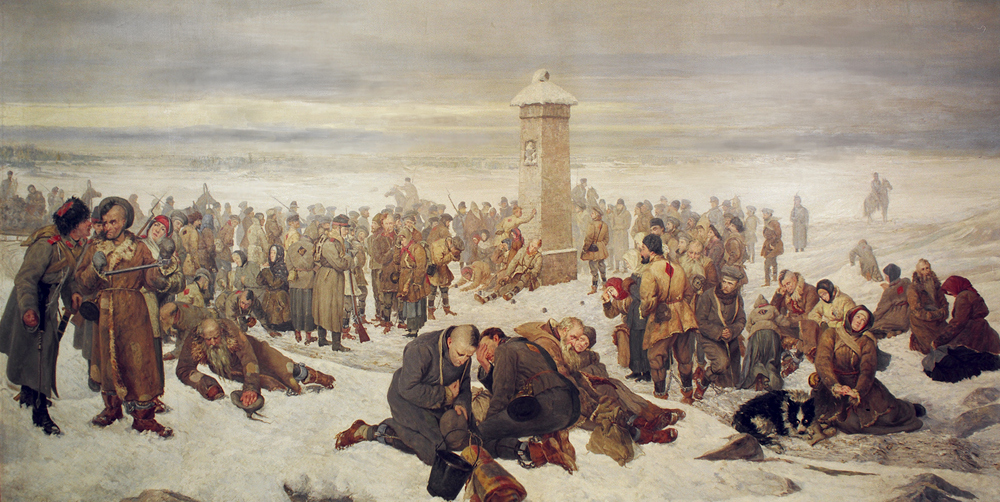
Farewell Europe by Aleksander Sochaczewski

After the failure of the January Uprising in Poland in 1863–1864, the Russian empire exiled many of the Poles involved to Siberia.

The insurgents had brief contacts with Siberian nationalists, who hoped for a general Siberian uprising and the establishment of the republic of Svobodoslaviya (Свободославия). They also had contact with Nikolai Serno-Solovyevich; another group supporting the insurgents was the Zemlya i Volya with activists such as Nikolai Chernyshevsky and Aleksandr Herzen. The Poles and the Russians planned a major uprising under Chernyshevsky and Walenty Lewandowski, but due to betrayal a wave of arrests disrupted their plans.

Although the arrests prevented a major uprising from occurring, a group of about 700 Poles who were assigned to the construction of the Circumbaikal Highway (a road near Lake Baikal and the Mongolian border) decided to disarm the guards and escape via Mongolia to China, where they hoped to find English ships and return to Europe by way of America.

== The uprising ==
The insurgents called themselves a Siberian Legion of Free Poles (Syberyjski Legion Wolnych Polaków). Numbering about 700 people and led by Narcyz Celiński and Gustaw Szaramowicz they attacked the nearby units of Russian Army, starting with their escort of 138 soldiers. They liberated other small groups of prisoners and raided local institutions such as the post office. However some of the Russian soldiers (Cossacks) taken captive managed to escape and alerted the governor-general in Irkutsk. A major mobilization of Russian forces in Siberia occurred, with many thousands of troops converging on the insurgents. The insurgents split, with Celiński trying to evade the enemy forces and Szaramowicz trying to break through them. Some of the insurgents quickly surrendered, particularly those who were content with the partial amnesty and reduction of sentences they received in the aftermath of an assassination attempt on Alexander II of Russia in April that year. On 28 June the rest, commanded by Szaramowicz, were defeated at the battle of Mishikha (Miszychna, Мишиха).

== Aftermath ==
Most of the insurgents were either killed or captured. Virtually none escaped, although some were taken prisoner weeks after the uprising started. All of the 400 survivors had their sentences increased, and four of the leaders were to be executed (in addition to Celiński and Szaramowicz, Władysław Kotkowski and Jakub Reiner). They were allowed to write letters to their families, but they were never delivered, as the delivery was stopped by a personal order from tsar Alexander II of Russia. They were executed on 27 November 1866 near Irkutsk.

Polish poet Kornel Ujejski dedicated one of his poems to this event. A street in Irkutsk is also named after Polish insurgents.
