= Pereyomnaya =

Pereyomnaya Переёмная
- Settlement
- Location within Republic of Buryatia Location within Russia
- Coordinates: 51°34′N 105°15′E
- Country: Russia
- Region: Republic of Buryatia
- District: Kabansky District
- Time zone: UTC+8:00

Pereyomnaya (Russian: Переёмная) is a rural locality (a settlement) in Kabansky District, Republic of Buryatia, Russia. The population was 89 as of 2010. There are 4 streets.

== Geography ==
Pereyomnaya is located 118 km southwest of Kabansk (the district's administrative centre) by road. Osinovka is the nearest rural locality.
