= Kedrovy =

Kedrovy (masculine), Kedrovaya (feminine), or Kedrovoye (neuter) may refer to:

- Kedrovy (inhabited locality) (Kedrovaya, Kedrovoye), name of several inhabited localities in Russia
- Kedrovy Urban Okrug, name of several urban okrugs in Russia
