= Kudara, Republic of Buryatia =

Kudara Кудара
- Selo
- Location within Republic of Buryatia Location within Russia
- Coordinates: 52°13′N 106°39′E
- Country: Russia
- Region: Republic of Buryatia
- District: Kabansky District
- Time zone: UTC+8:00

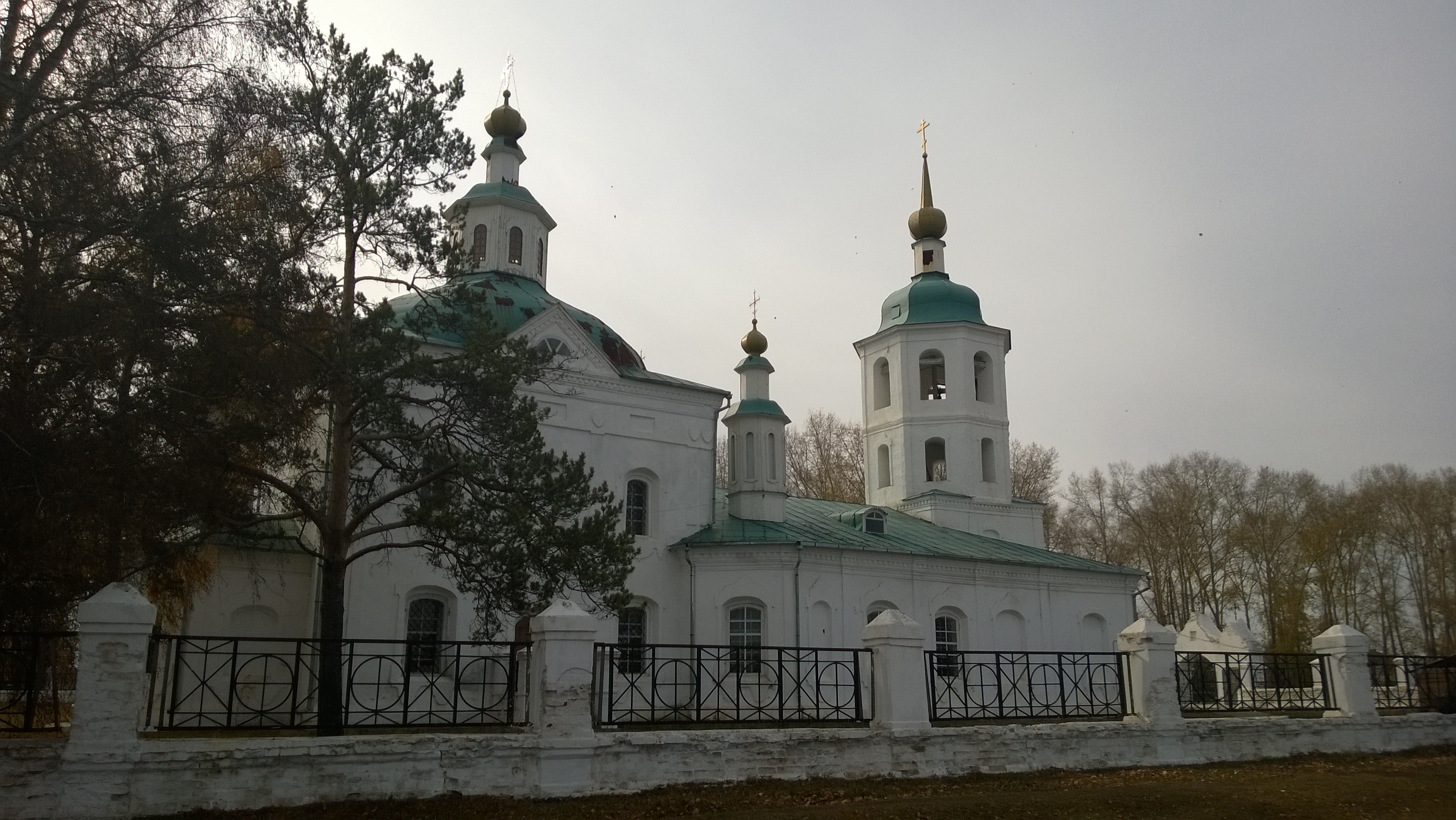

Kudara (Russian: Кудара; Buryat: Хγдэри, Khüderi) is a rural locality (a selo) in Kabansky District, Republic of Buryatia, Russia. The population was 2,058 as of 2010. There are 21 streets.

== Geography ==
Kudara is located 47 km north of Kabansk (the district's administrative centre) by road. Korsakovo is the nearest rural locality.
