= Kudara =

Kudara may refer to:

- Kudara, the Japanese name for Baekje, an old Korean Kingdom
- Kudara, Republic of Buryatia, a rural locality in Kabansky District, Republic of Buryatia, Russia
- Kudara no Konikishi, a Japanese clan
- Kudara Kannon, a Buddhist sculptures of the Asuka period that is a treasure of the Hōryū-ji temple.
