= Polevoy, Republic of Buryatia =

Polevoy Полевой
- Settlement
- Location within Republic of Buryatia Location within Russia
- Coordinates: 51°55′N 106°07′E
- Country: Russia
- Region: Republic of Buryatia
- District: Kabansky District
- Time zone: UTC+8:00

Polevoy (Russian: Полевой) is a rural locality (a settlement) in Kabansky District, Republic of Buryatia, Russia. The population was 3 as of 2010.

== Geography ==
Polevoy is located 48 km southwest of Kabansk (the district's administrative centre) by road. Baykalsky Priboy is the nearest rural locality.
