= Selenginsky =

Selenginsky (masculine), Selenginskaya (feminine), or Selenginskoye (neuter) may refer to:

- Selenginsky District, a district of the Republic of Buryatia, Russia
- Selenginskoye Urban Settlement, a municipal formation which Selenginsk Urban-Type Settlement in Kabansky District of the Republic of Buryatia is incorporated as
