= Rechka Mishikha =

Rechka Mishikha Речка Мишиха
- Settlement
- Location within Republic of Buryatia Location within Russia
- Coordinates: 51°38′N 105°32′E
- Country: Russia
- Region: Republic of Buryatia
- District: Kabansky District
- Time zone: UTC+8:00

Rechka Mishikha (Russian: Речка Мишиха) is a rural locality (a settlement) in Kabansky District, Republic of Buryatia, Russia. The population was 18 as of 2010. There are 3 streets.

== Geography ==
Rechka Mishikha is located 97 km (60 mi) southwest of Kabansk (the district's administrative centre) by road. Klyuyevka is the nearest rural locality.
