= Dubinino, Republic of Buryatia =

Dubinino Дубинино
- Selo
- Location within Republic of Buryatia Location within Russia
- Coordinates: 52°18′N 106°45′E
- Country: Russia
- Region: Republic of Buryatia
- District: Kabansky District
- Time zone: UTC+8:00

Dubinino (Russian: Дубинино) is a rural locality (a selo) in Kabansky District, Republic of Buryatia, Russia. The population was 337 as of 2010. There are 2 streets.

== Geography ==
Dubinino is located 57 km (35 mi) north of Kabansk (the district's administrative centre) by road. Inkino is the nearest rural locality.
