= Slavne =

Slavne (Ukrainian: Славне) may refer to several settlements in Ukraine:

- Slavne, Kalmiuske Raion, Donetsk Oblast
- Slavne, Horlivka Raion, Donetsk Oblast
