= Mishikha =

Mishikha Мишиха
- Settlement
- Location within Republic of Buryatia Location within Russia
- Coordinates: 51°39′N 105°35′E
- Country: Russia
- Region: Republic of Buryatia
- District: Kabansky District
- Time zone: UTC+8:00

Mishikha (Russian: Мишиха) is a rural locality (a settlement) in Kabansky District, Republic of Buryatia, Russia. The population was 72 as of 2010. There are 5 streets.

== Geography ==
Mishikha is located 92 km southwest of Kabansk (the district's administrative centre) by road. Ivanovka and 5,450 km are the nearest rural localities.
