= Annie Francé-Harrar =

Austrian biologist and writer

Annie Francé-Harrar (born 2 December 1886 Munich, Germany; died 23 January 1971 Hallein, Austria) was an Austrian writer and scientist in the area of soil microbiology and organic farming.

Francé-Harrar created the scientific basis for humus-compost-farming, together with her second husband Raoul Heinrich Francé. During her life she wrote 47 books, some 5000 articles in the German press, and held over 500 lectures and courses, including radio broadcasts.

== Early life ==
Harrar was born to a Polish artist, Aleksander Sochaczewski and his wife.

At a young age she combined her artistic and literary talent with technical research. Her first work was published in 1911 and described in verses the lives of women over the centuries. She later created some of the drawings and photographs which appeared in her publications.

She married in 1911, but this marriage ended in divorce after six years.

== Career ==
In 1916 she met Raoul H. Francé, director of the Biological Institute in Munich. She then became his assistant. Her first utopian novel The Fire Souls was published in 1920 and described the problem of the destruction of soil fertility.

After the divorce from her first husband, she married Francé in Dinkelsbühl 1923. In 1924 the couple settled down in Salzburg. There she wrote - based on impressions and research - a book about the famous doctor Paracelsus, who had died in Salzburg in 1541. The period to 1930 was the first group of overseas travels, and the publication of a series of monographs. The couple frequently stayed in Ragusa (today's Dubrovnik) on the southern Adriatic coast - from there the couple fled from the turmoil of the Second World War to Budapest in 1943, where Francé died a few months later from leukemia which had been recognized too late.

After the end of the Second World War Francé-Harrar began constructing a breeding station for the transformation of urban waste in Budapest and developed the first Impfziegel (bioreactor) for composting.

In 1947 she returned to Austria. Through the Bavarian Agriculture Publishers her work appeared in 1950 with the title The Last Chance – for a future without need, which was well received and popular. This work was admired by Albert Einstein who said it would have a permanent place in world literature. As a result of this book, she was appointed on behalf of the government in Mexico and supported the country for nine years in setting up a large humus organization in the fight against erosion and soil degradation.

After almost 40 years of work, her book Humus – soil life and fertility was published in 1958. She also wrote several novels.

After several intermediate stops in Europe she returned in 1961 to their home. She was still actively working in the World Union for Protection of Life and other organizations. She spent her last years in the pension Schloss Kahlsberg, where she died in January 1971 after a short illness at 85 years of age. On January 26 she was buried at the side of her husband in Oberalm-Hallein.

== Works ==
- Die Kette, 1911
- Die Feuerseelen, 1920
- Rasse: Menschen von Gestern und Morgen, 1920
- Tier und Liebe - Geschichten von Unterdrückten und Verkannten, 1926
- Suedsee, 1928
- Der Glaserne Regen - Novel - J.P. Toth Verlag, Hamburg 1948
- Die letzte Chance - Für eine Zukunft ohne Not. München 1950
- Und Eines Tages - J.P. Toth Verlag, Hamburg 1952
- Humus - Bodenleben und Fruchtbarkeit. München 1958
- So War's um Neunzehnhundert: Mein Fin De Seicle- Albert Langen - Georg Muller Verlag, Munchen, 1962
- Frag Nicht Woher Die Liebe Kommt - Roman- Langen Muller, Munchen 1967
