= Khrestivka =

City in Donetsk Oblast, Ukraine

Khrestivka Ukrainian: Хрестівка Russian: Кировское
- City
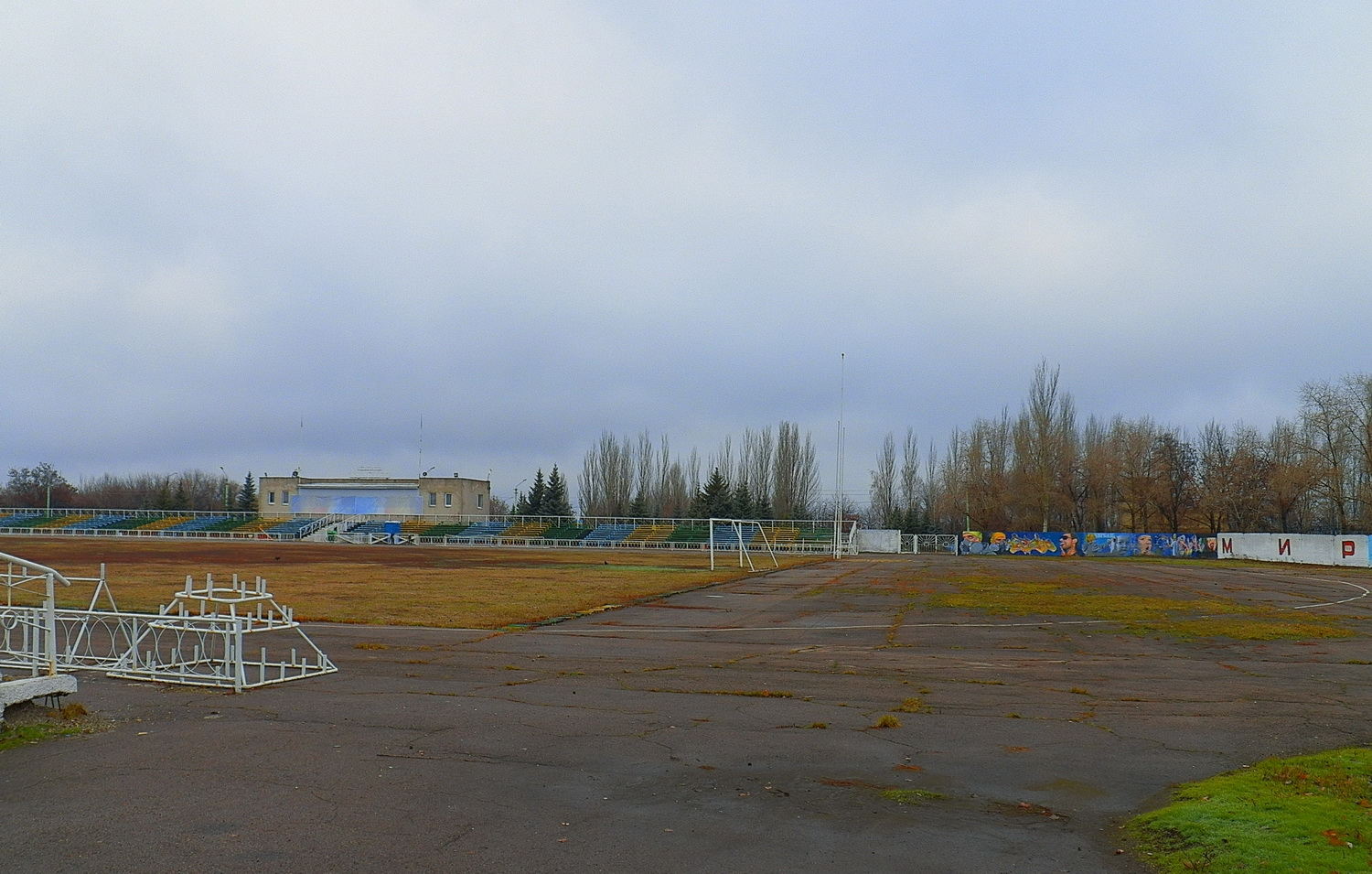
- Yuvileiny Stadium

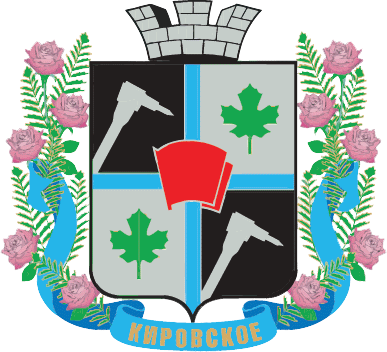
- Flag Coat of arms
- Interactive map of Khrestivka
- Location within Donetsk Oblast Location within Ukraine
- Coordinates: 48°08′47″N 38°21′38″E
- Country: Ukraine
- Oblast: Donetsk Oblast
- Raion: Horlivka Raion
- Hromada: Khrestivka urban hromada
- Founded: 1954
- City status: 1958

Area
  - Total: 725 km^{2} (280 sq mi)

Population (2022)
  - Total: 27,370
  - Density: 3,882/km^{2} (10,050/sq mi)
- Time zone: UTC+2 (EET)
  - Summer (DST): UTC+3 (EEST)
- Postal code: 86300-86390

Khrestivka (Ukrainian: Хрестівка; Russian: Крестовка, romanized: Krestovka) or Kirovske (Ukrainian: Кіровське; Russian: Кировское, romanized: Kirovskoye) is a city in Donetsk Oblast, Ukraine. Its population is approximately 27,370 (2022 estimate).

Since 2014, Khrestivka has been occupied by Russia and its proxy forces.

== History ==
=== Early history ===
Until 1941, there was a German settlement at the site of the modern city named Mannheim. The legal name of the settlement in Imperial Russian and later Soviet records was Davydo-Orlivka (Ukrainian: Давидо-Орлівка), but it was also colloquially known as "Khrestivka" (roughly meaning "Cross-town") due to a cross-shaped road sign near the village. During World War II, in which Nazi Germany invaded the Soviet Union, the German population was deported to Siberia.

The modern settlement was officially founded at the same site in 1954 as Nova Khrestivka (Ukrainian: Нова Хрестівка), in connection with the coal mines that were dug at the same time. In 1958, it was given city status and renamed to Kirovske.

In 1987, Kirovske was designated as a city of regional significance - a city that did not belong to any raion and was directly subordinate to Donetsk Oblast.

=== 21st century ===
On 14 April 2014 pro-Russian separatists captured Kirovske's town hall and declared that the city was part of the separatist Donetsk People's Republic (DPR).

On 12 May 2016, the Ukrainian parliament renamed the city Kirovske back to Khrestivka in accordance with decommunization laws.

On 3 July 2019, two boys in Khrestivka were injured after playing with a hand grenade.

In Ukraine, the administrative divisions were changed on 18 July 2020, and the reform reduced the number of raions of Donetsk Oblast to eight. The city of Khrestivka was merged into newly established Horlivka Raion.

On 30 September 2022, during the full-scale Russian invasion of Ukraine, Russian President Vladimir Putin signed a decree claiming to annex four regions, including Donetsk Oblast, as part of Russia. This annexation has been seen by the global community as a breach of international law. On 20 June 2023, Head of the DPR Denis Pushilin claimed that doctors from the Sakha Republic in Russia would be working in a hospital in occupied Khrestivka. This was among a number of instances of patronage programs being established between Russia-occupied territories and actual Russian federal subjects, particularly Sakha. On 9 August the same year, Ukrainian resistance outlets reported that Russia began deporting teenagers from several settlements in occupied Donetsk Oblast to Russia, including from Khrestivka.

== Demographics ==
Population history
Year	Pop.	±% p.a.
1959	16,300	—
1979	20,400	+1.13%
1998	32,100	+2.41%
2001	30,910	−1.25%
2022	27,370	−0.58%

As of the Ukrainian census of 2001:

Ethnic groups in Khrestivka
	percent
Ukrainians	54.22%
Russians	41.56%
Belarusians	1.45%
Azeris	0.50%
Tatars	0.42%
Armenians	0.25%
Georgians	0.22%
Ukrainian Greeks	0.17%
Moldovans	0.16%
others	1.05%

Native languages in Khrestivka
	percent
Russian	82.39%
Ukrainian	16.90%
Belarusian	0.15%
Armenian	0.05%
others	0.51%

== Notable people ==
- Yevhen Apryshko (born 1985), a Ukrainian football player
- Serhiy Atelkin (1972-2020), a Ukrainian football player
- Sasha Korban (born 1987), a Ukrainian miner and street artist
