= Kedrovaya, Republic of Buryatia =

Kedrovaya Кедровая
- Settlement
- Location within Republic of Buryatia Location within Russia
- Coordinates: 51°30′N 104°55′E
- Country: Russia
- Region: Republic of Buryatia
- District: Kabansky District
- Time zone: UTC+8:00

Kedrovaya (Russian: Кедровая) is a rural locality (a settlement) in Kabansky District, Republic of Buryatia, Russia. The population was 89 as of 2010. There are 6 streets.
