= Sybirak =

Polish people exiled to Siberia

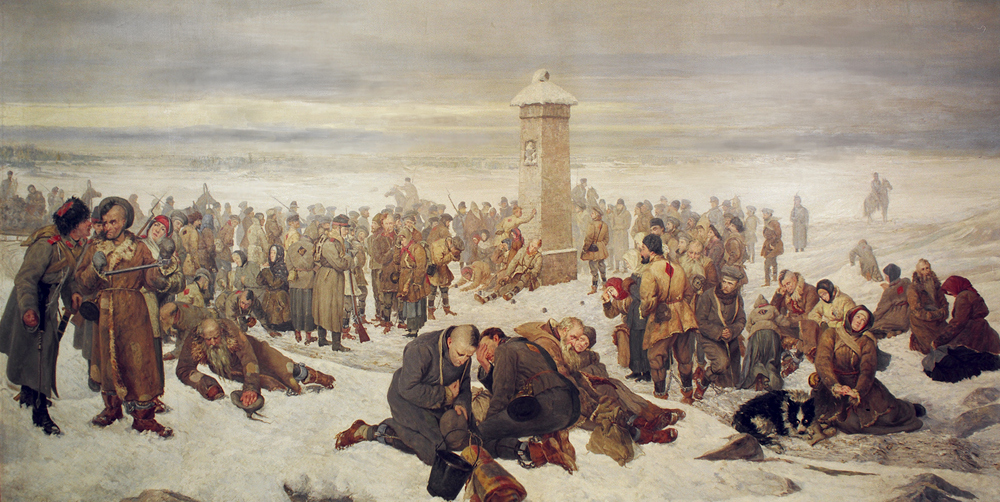
Farewell to Europe, by Aleksander Sochaczewski.

A sybirak (Polish: [sɨˈbirak], plural: sybiracy) is a person resettled to Siberia. Like its Russian counterpart sibiryák, the word can refer to any dweller of Siberia, but it more specifically refers to Poles imprisoned or exiled to Siberia or even to those sent to the Russian Arctic or to Kazakhstan in the 1940s (post World War II).

== History ==
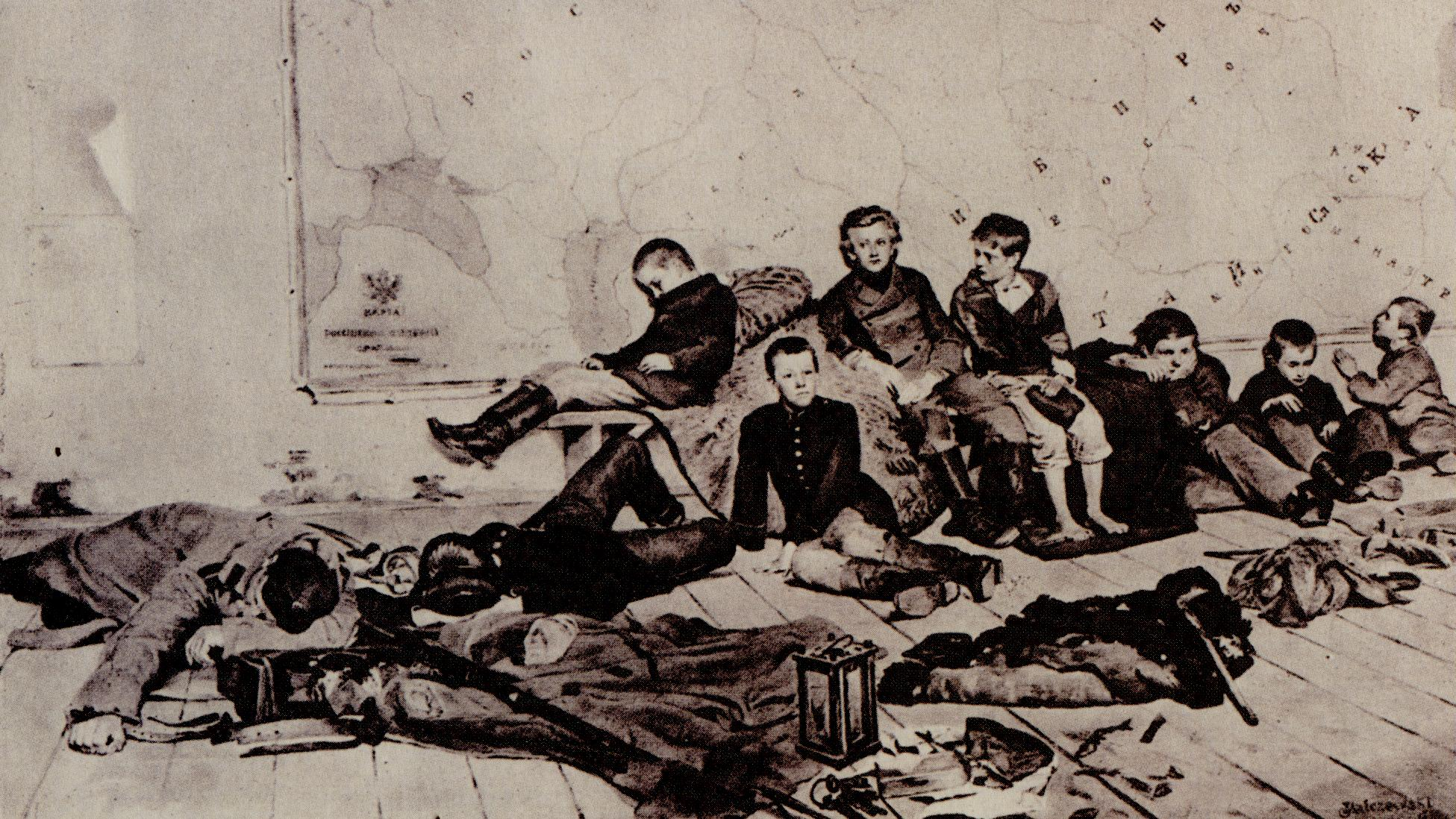
Black and white reproduction of Zesłanie Studentów (Students Exile) by Jacek Malczewski from 1891

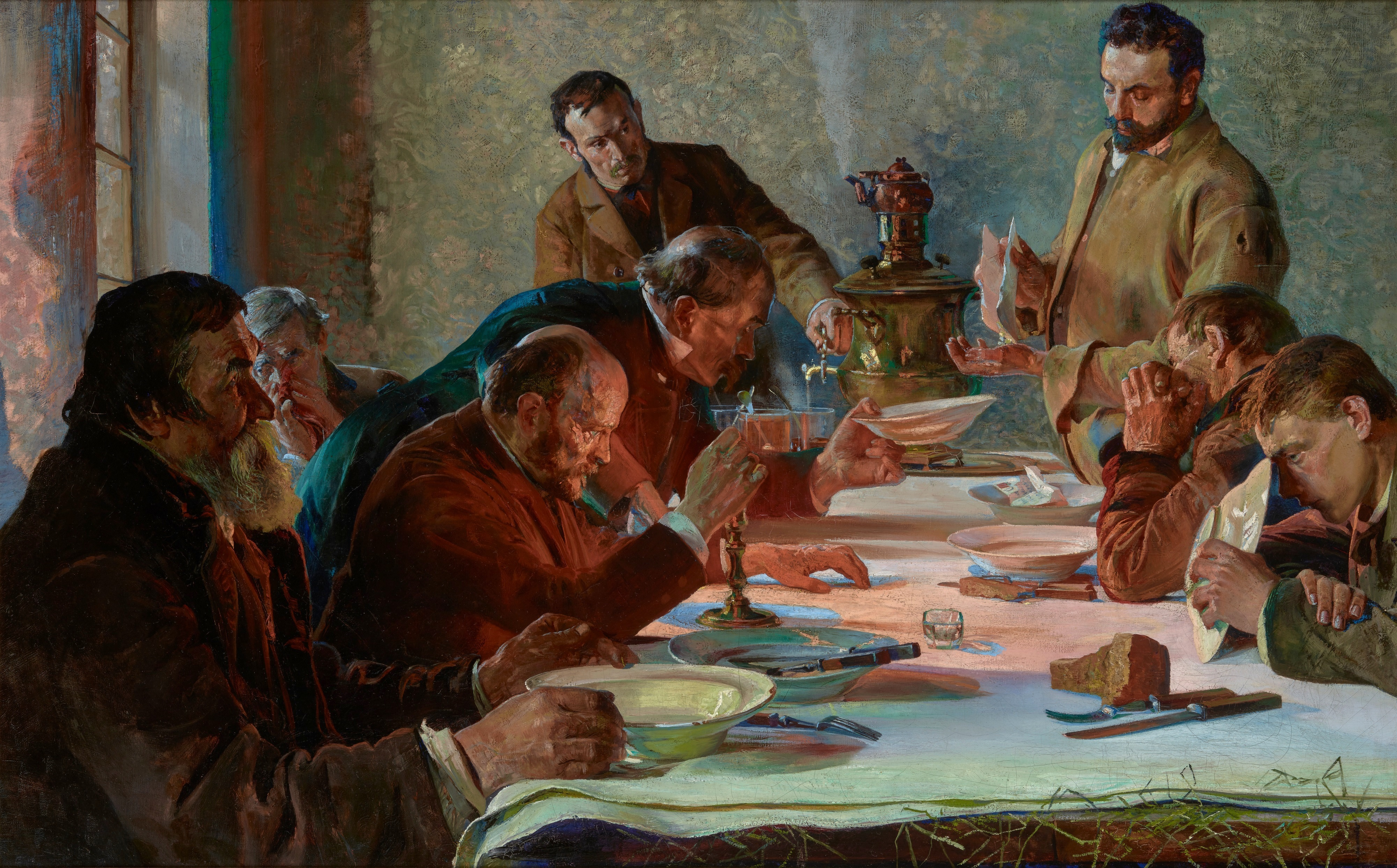
Christmas Eve in Siberia, by Jacek Malczewski, 1892.

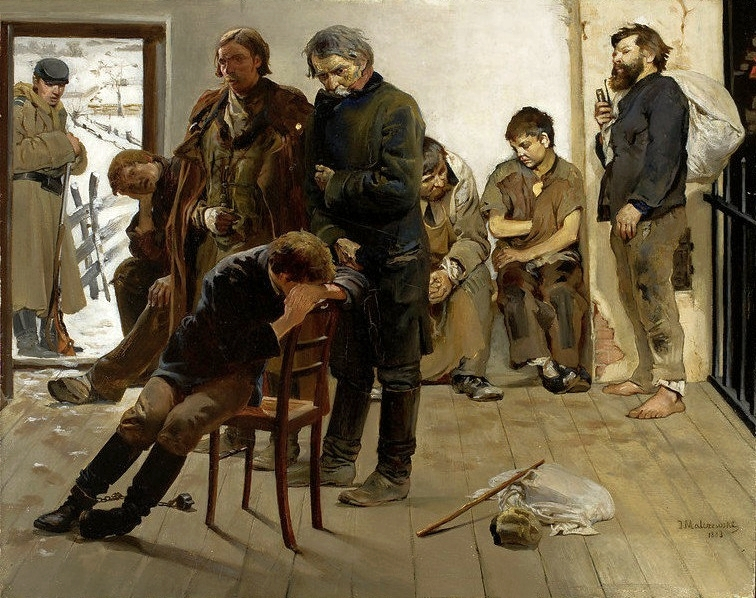
The Prisoners, Jacek Malczewski, 1883

Russian and Soviet authorities exiled many Poles to Siberia, starting with the 18th-century opponents of the Russian Empire's increasing influence in the Polish–Lithuanian Commonwealth (most notably the members of the Bar Confederation of 1768–1772). Maurice, Count de Benyovszky was deported and emigrated to Madagascar.

After the Russian Empire's penal law changed in 1847, exile and penal labor (katorga) became common punishment for participants in national uprisings within the empire. This led to sending an increasing number of Poles to Siberia for katorga, when they then became known as Sybiraks. Some of them remained there, forming a Polish minority in Siberia. Most of them came from the participants and supporters of the November Uprising of 1830-1831 and of the January Uprising of 1863–1864, from the participants of the 1905-1907 unrest and from the hundreds of thousands of people deported after the Soviet invasion of Poland in 1939.

Around the late 19th century, a number of Polish voluntary settlers moved to Siberia, attracted by the economic development of the region. Polish migrants and exiles, many of whom were forbidden to move away from the region even after having finished serving their sentence, formed a Polish minority there. Hundreds of Poles took part in the construction of the Trans-Siberian Railway. Notable Polish scholars studied Siberia, such as Aleksander Czekanowski, Jan Czerski, Benedykt Dybowski, Wiktor Godlewski, Sergiusz Jastrzębski, Edward Piekarski (1858–1934), Bronisław Piłsudski, Wacław Sieroszewski, Mikołaj Witkowski and others.

The term Sybiracy might also refer to former exiles, such as those who were allowed to return to Russian controlled parts of Poland following the amnesty of 1857. The group, popular among the youth in the period preceding the outbreak of the January Uprising, supported the idea of organic work. However, during the January Uprising it ceased to exist as some of its members supported the Reds, while others supported the Whites. Among the most notable members of the group were Agaton Giller, Henryk Krajewski, Karol Ruprecht and Szymon Tokarzewski.

About 20,000 Poles lived in Siberia around the 1860s. An unsuccessful uprising of Polish political exiles in Siberia broke out in 1866.

=== Soviet era ===
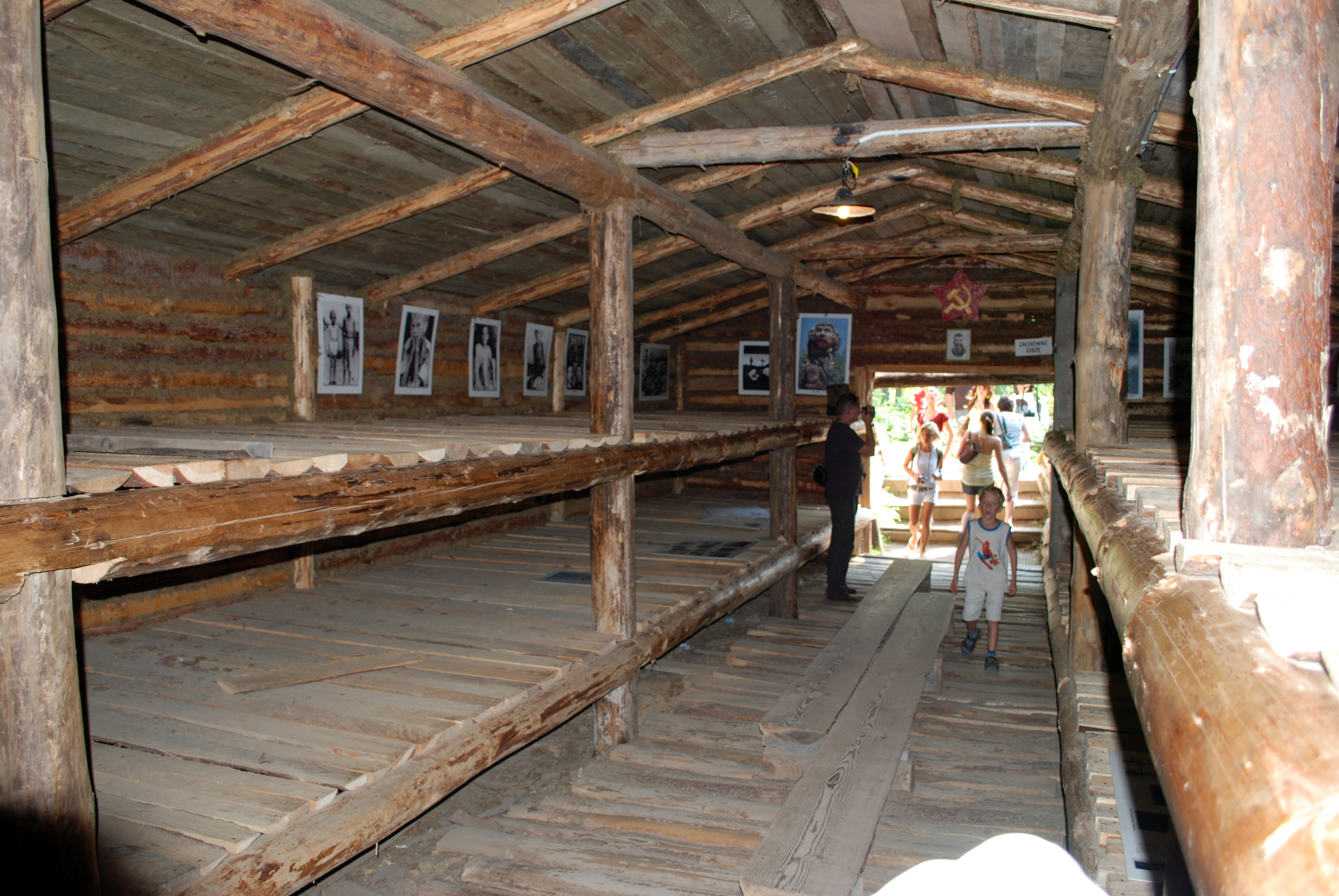
A replica of a barrack of a GULAG prison camp in Poland

At the start of World War II the Soviets deported hundreds of thousands of Polish citizens, most of them in four mass waves. Some sources claim as many as 1.5 million deportees. The most conservative figures use recently found NKVD documents showing 309,000 to 381,220.

Soviet authorities did not recognize ethnic Poles as Polish citizens. In addition, some of the figures are based on those given an amnesty rather than those deported, and not everyone was eligible for amnesty. Therefore, figures based on official evidence might be an underestimation.

== See also ==
- Zesłańców Syberyjskich Roundabout, Warsaw
- Siberian Exiles Cross
- Anhelli by Juliusz Słowacki

General:

- Katorga, Russian Empire exile
- Forced labor in the Soviet Union
