= Siberian Exiles Roundabout =

Roundabout in Warsaw, Poland

Coordinates: 52°12′59″N 20°57′38″E

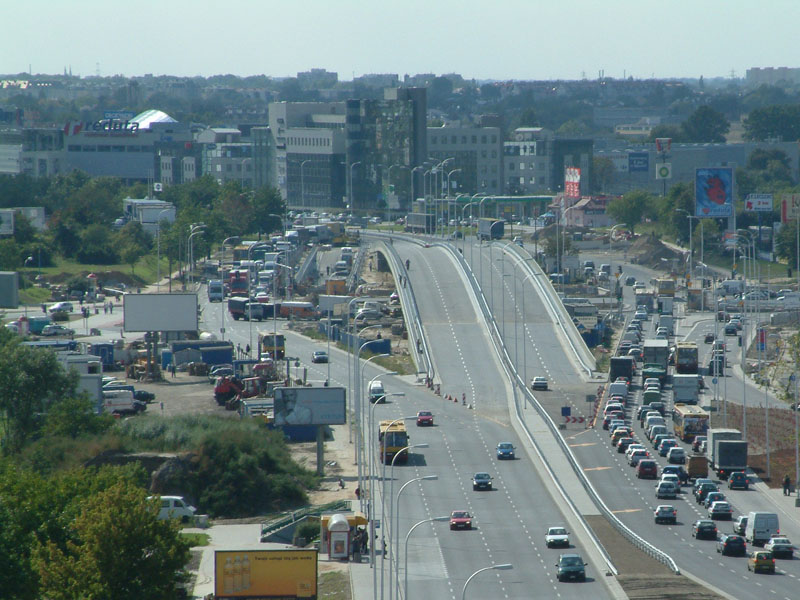
Rondo Zesłańców Syberyjskich

The Rondo Zesłańców Syberyjskich is a roundabout in western Warsaw's Ochota district. It is named in honor of Poles exiled to Siberia throughout history.

The following streets meet at Rondo Zesłańców Syberyjskich :

- on the east, Jerusalem Avenue (aleje Jerozolimskie);
- on the west, Jerusalem Avenue (aleje Jerozolimskie);
- on the north, Millennial Primate Avenue (aleja Prymasa Tysiąclecia);
- on the south, 1920 Battle of Warsaw Street (ulica Bitwy Warszawskiej 1920 roku).
