= Baikal Highway =

Federal highway in Russia

Federal Highway R258
- Федеральная автомобильная дорога Р258
- Baikal Highway
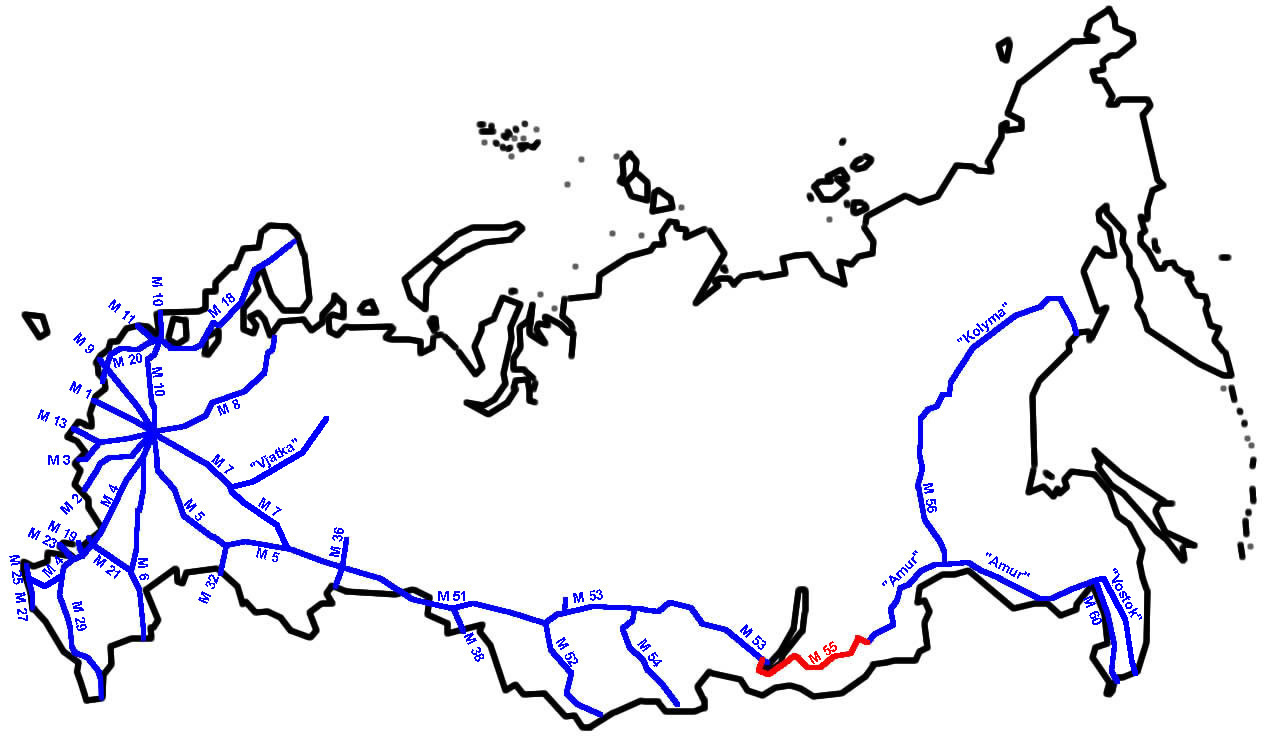

Route information
- Part of AH6
- Length: 1,113 km (692 mi)

Major junctions
- West end: R 255 in Irkutsk

- East end: R 297 in Chita

Location
- Country: Russia

Highway system
- Russian Federal Highways

The Baikal Highway is a federal highway in Russia. Its official designation is federal highway R258 "Baikal" (Russian: Федеральная автомобильная дорога Р258 «Байкал»). It is part of the Trans-Siberian Highway and of the AH6 route of the Asian Highway Network. It is named after the Russian Lake Baikal.

The road has 296 bridges and no tunnels. There are no toll segments on the highway.

== Gallery ==
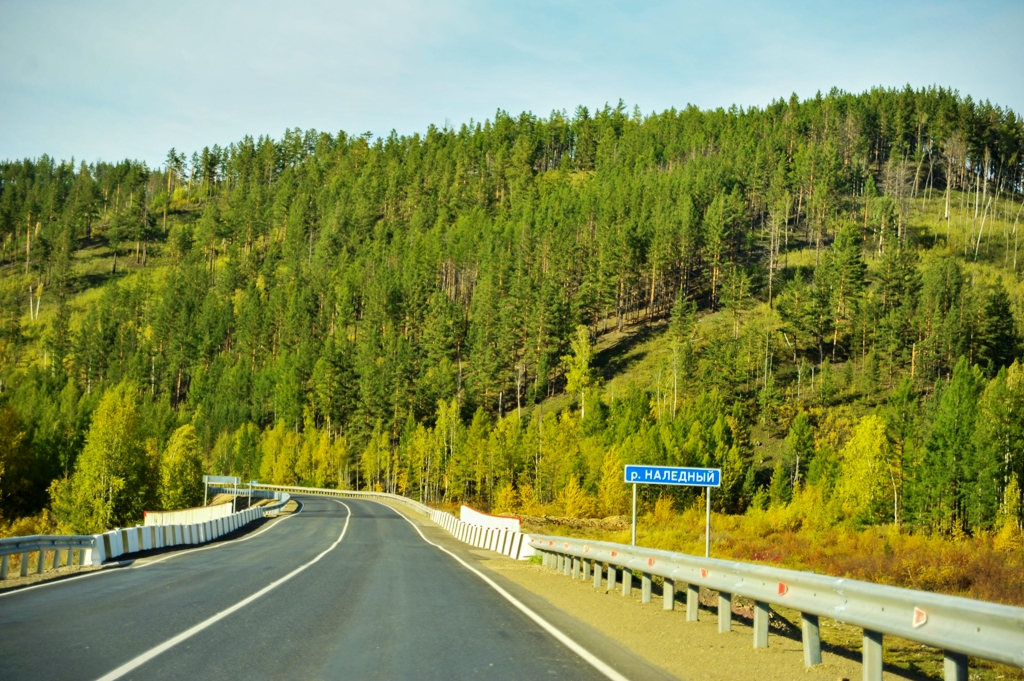

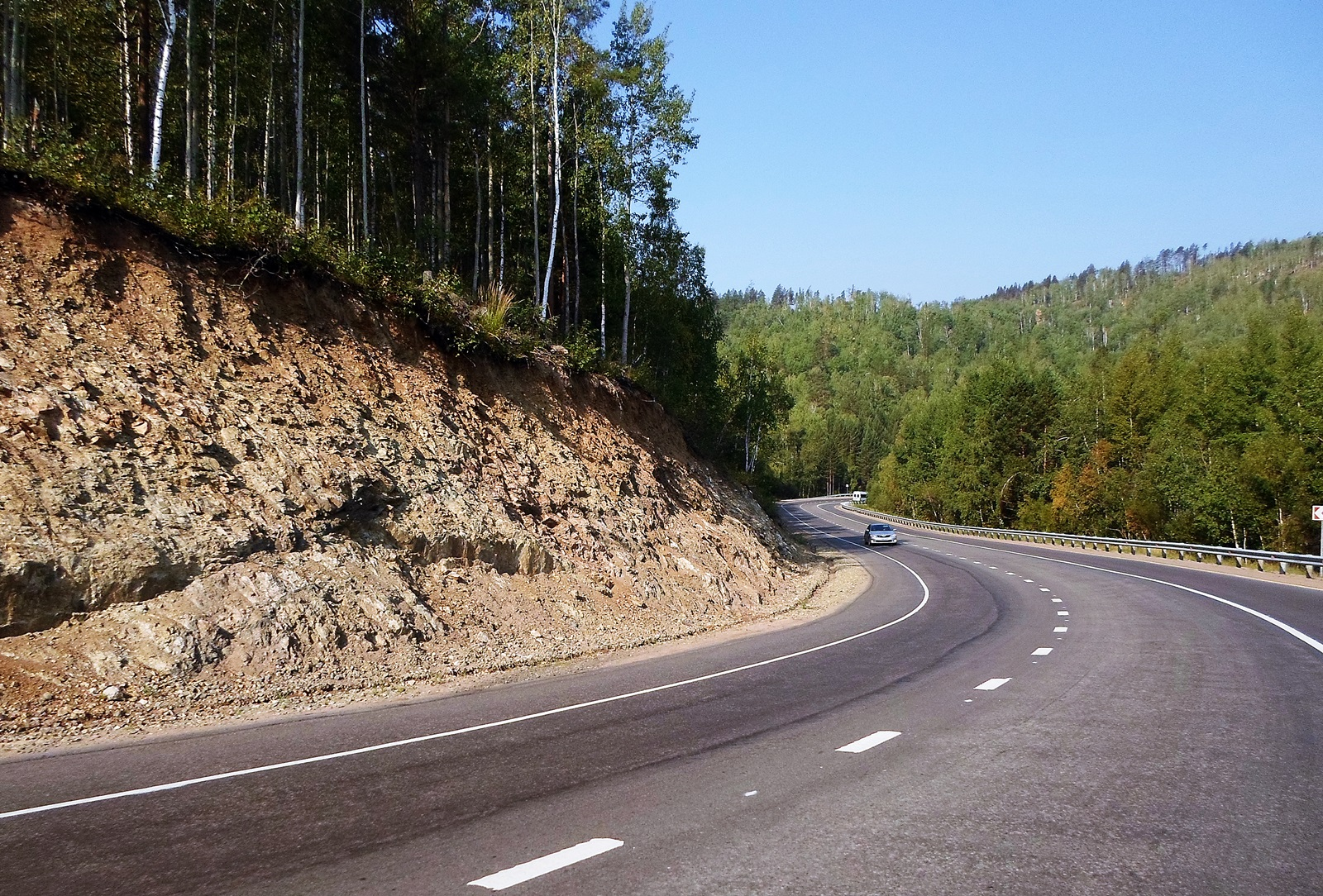

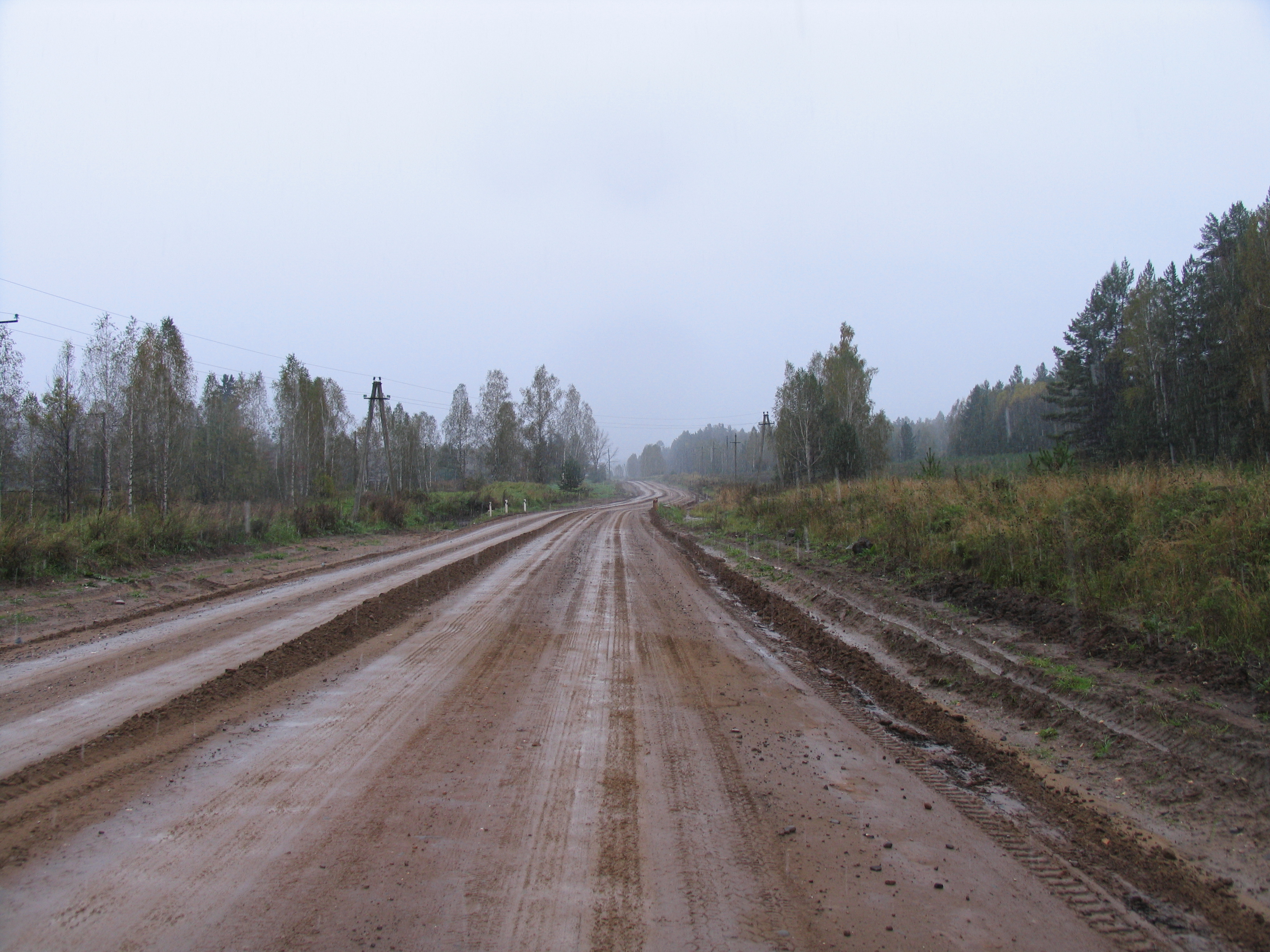
Krasnoyarsk–Irkutsk section of R258 highway before the reconstruction near Taishet, 2007.

== See also ==
- Circumbaikal Highway
