= Circumbaikal Highway =

The Circumbaikal Highway (Around Baikal Highway, Round Baikal Highway, Russian: Кругобайкальский тракт, Krugabaikalsky Trakt) was part of the Main Siberian Postal Highway (главный сибирский почтовый тракт). It started from Irkutsk, went along the Irkut River, further southwards around Lake Baikal (hence the name) to the village of Kultushnoye (now Kultuk). At Kultushnoye the road turned south and went into Mongolia. The initial run of the road (up to Kutlushnoye, 93 verst (~99 km)) was constructed during 1796-1801. In 1803 it was decided to modernize and extend the road. The extension from Kutlushnoye to Posolsky Monastery was started in 1867. The latter stretch is associated with the uprising of Polish political exiles in Siberia of 1866.

== See also ==
- Circum-Baikal Railway
- Baikal Highway
