= The Prisoners (painting) =

1883 painting by Jacek Malczewski

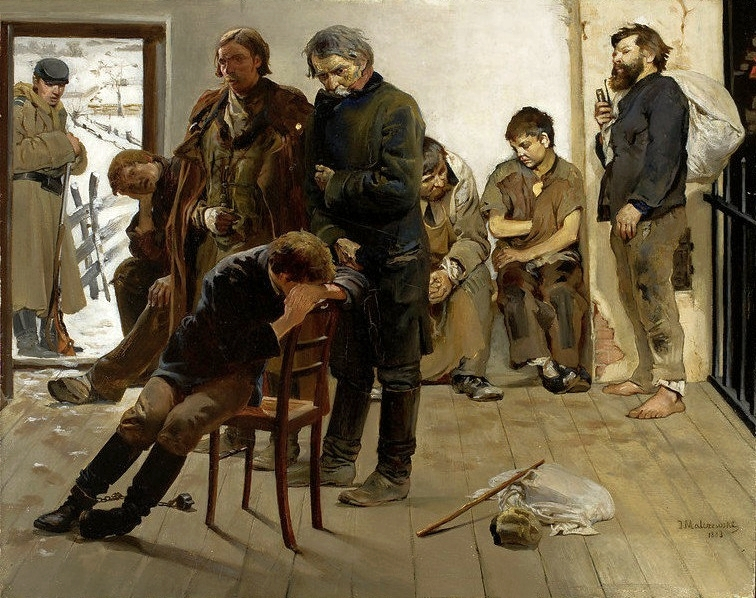
- Artist: Jacek Malczewski
- Year: 1883
- Medium: Oil-on-cardboard
- Dimensions: 30.5 cm × 38.5 cm (12 in × 15.1 in)
- Location: National Museum; Warsaw

The Prisoners (Polish: Aresztanci, also known as Na etapie) is an 1883 oil painting by Polish painter Jacek Malczewski. It depicts a group of Polish political prisoners exiled to Siberia for their participation in the national January Uprising of 1863–1864 against Tsarist Russia. It is now displayed at the National Museum in Warsaw.

== Background ==
January Uprising began on 22 January 1863 and was aimed at the restoration of the Polish–Lithuanian Commonwealth. The conflict was the longest lasting insurgency in post-partition Poland and engaged all levels of society. The uprising was suppressed in 1864 and among the many reprisals of the Russian Empire against the insurrectionists were forced deportations to Siberia.

Jacek Malczewski, similarly to fellow painter Józef Chełmoński, witnessed the January Uprising as a child, which had exerted a lasting impact on the artist as an adult. He created many paintings forming a significant part of Poland's rich iconography portraying the country's fight for independence during the Age of Partitions and The Prisoners is one of the artist's works directly referring to the fate of Poles sentenced to resettlement in Siberia.

== Description and analysis ==
The painting forms part of the Siberian Compositions series by Malczewski and shows a strong influence of Artur Grottger in tackling the subject matter. It depicts a group of Polish captives, known as sybiraks, taking a rest on their long and dangerous road to Siberia. They differ in age, social status as well as the way they individually experience their tragic circumstances. The foreground presents members of the intelligentsia and students with the figure of a despairing youth wearing a shackle on his ankle and sitting on a chair covering his face in his arms. An elderly man is leaning towards him trying to comfort the young man. In the background, there are figures of members belonging to the lower class and peasants, wearing shabby clothes and carrying their belongings. This realistic juxtaposition of well-educated, noble patriots with commoners, some of whom were petty criminals, leads to the demythologization of the popular image of sybiraks in Polish culture. A sense of isolation between the two groups depicted in the painting serves the purpose of demonstrating that the willingness to accept the sacrifice for the nation's independence was not shared by all members of the Polish society.

On the left, a Russian soldier holding a rifle is standing at the entrance to the barrack and guarding the seven men and boys inside. A wintry landscape is visible in the distance. The portrayal of the prisoners' misery and suffering was meant to arouse patriotic feelings and is seen as an analogy to the suffering of the entire nation under foreign rule. The domination of dark and grey colours reinforces the atmosphere of sadness. It contrasts with the artist's later works full of colours and hidden symbolic meanings.

== See also ==
- List of Polish painters
