= Ridkodub, Horlivka Raion, Donetsk Oblast =

Ridkodub Рідкодуб
- Rural settlement
- Interactive map of Ridkodub
- Location within Ukraine
- Coordinates: 48.267222°N 38.521389°E
- Country: Ukraine
- Oblast: Donetsk Oblast
- Raion: Horlivka Raion
- Hromada: Khrestivka urban hromada

Area
  - Total: 10 km^{2} (3.9 sq mi)

Population (2001 census)
  - Total: 26
  - Density: 2.6/km^{2} (6.7/sq mi)
- Time zone: UTC+2 (EET)
  - Summer (DST): UTC+3 (EEST)
- Postal code: 86220
- Area code: +380 6255
- KATOTTH: UA14060130200022068

Ridkodub (Ukrainian: Рідкодуб) is a rural settlement in Horlivka Raion, Donetsk Oblast, eastern Ukraine. It belongs to Khrestivka urban hromada, one of the hromadas of Ukraine.

== Demographics ==
As of the 2001 Ukrainian census, the settlement had 26 inhabitants, whose native languages were 61.54% Ukrainian and 38.46% Russian.
