= Polevoy, Belgorod Oblast =

Polevoy Полевой
- Settlement
- Location within Belgorod Oblast Location within Russia
- Coordinates: 50°43′N 37°31′E
- Country: Russia
- Region: Belgorod Oblast
- District: Novooskolsky District
- Time zone: UTC+3:00

Polevoy (Russian: Полевой) is a rural locality (a settlement) in Novooskolsky District, Belgorod Oblast, Russia. The population was 275 as of 2010. There are 3 streets.

== Geography ==
Polevoy is located 30 km west of Novy Oskol (the district's administrative centre) by road. Novosyolovka is the nearest rural locality.
