= Aleksander Sochaczewski =

Polish painter (1843–1923)

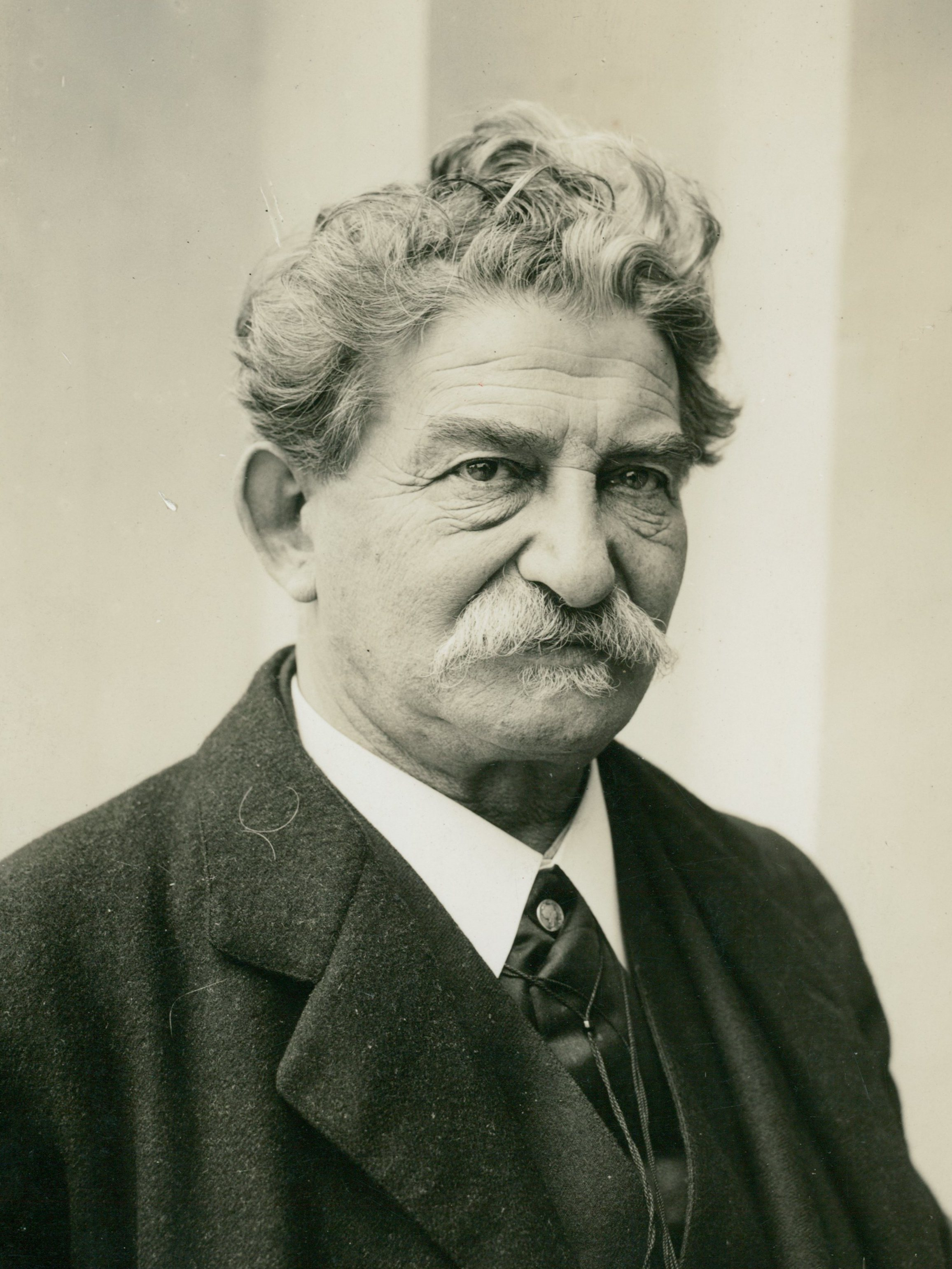
Aleksander Sochaczewski in 1913

Aleksander Sochaczewski (pronounced [alɛkˈsandɛr sɔxaˈt͡ʂɛfskʲi]; March 3, 1843, Iłów — April 15, 1923) was a Polish painter who participated in the Polish January Uprising against the Russian Empire in 1863. He was then exiled to Siberia. He is known for his paintings of the uprising and the Siberian katorga and exile.

== Biography ==
Aleksander Sochaczewski was born Leib Sonder. His parents were Jews. In 1858, Sochaczewski entered the Warsaw Academy of Fine Arts to learn painting. Even while still a student he stood out as an exceptionally talented artist. In the early part of the 1860s, infused with the spirit of revolution that was set in motion by the movement for Polish independence from Russia, Sochaczewski joined his fellow students in demonstrations and covert activities against the Russians. On September 2, 1862, Sochaczewski was arrested and imprisoned. A search of his apartment yielded equipment for making bullets, underground publications and other anti-government material. He was sentenced to death on 24 April 1863. His sentence was altered and he was sent instead for hard labor to Siberia.

=== Return from Siberia ===
Sochaczewski's prison term in Siberia ended in 1883, and he emigrated to Munich. There he found himself in the company of several Polish painters. A few years later, he moved to Brussels, living there for a few years before settling in Vienna. The 21 years Sochaczewski spent in Siberia left an indelible mark on his mind. Siberia, the harshness of weather and the taxing work at the camps, became a central theme to his works. Sochaczewski set about to depict life in the East. His paintings of this period of his life have the recurrent scenes of convicts and exiles, the arduous trip to Siberia, working conditions in the camp, commonplace activities of camp life, attempts of escaping from the camps, and the misery of the inmates. His works relating to this period won several awards in cities across Europe.

Sochaczewski's paintings were the standout feature of the exhibitions that were held in Lviv in 1913. The occasion was the 50th anniversary of the outbreak of the January Uprising. Sochaczewski eventually donated all his paintings to the city Lviv. In return, he asked for a life annuity. This way the painting collection, known as the 'Siberian Collection', became the property of the Lviv National Museum and was being kept together. During the 2nd World War, while Lviv fell successively to the Soviets and the Nazis, the collection was saved by being stored in Kiev.

In 1956 Sochaczewski's paintings were returned by the Soviet Ministry of Culture to Poland, as part of returning many old Polish heritage items to them. They found a temporary home at the Historical Museum of Warsaw. In 1963, on the 100th anniversary of the January Uprising, most of the collection was transferred to the newly formed Museum of Independence in the X^{th} Pavilion of the Warsaw Citadel, becoming part of its permanent display. The collection remains there today, comprising 118 paintings and some sketches.

== Farewell to Europe ==
Sochaczewski's most famous painting, Farewell to Europe (Polish: Pożegnanie Europy), is an homage to his Polish national pride. The name of the painting refers to the last stop of the exiles' convoy at the Europe-Asia border. It is a symbolic painting which depicts various famous Sybiraks (Polish exiles to Siberia), including himself, a person in the right of the Europe-Asia border obelisk looking at it. The painting is on display in the Museum of Independence, Warsaw, Poland.

Gallery

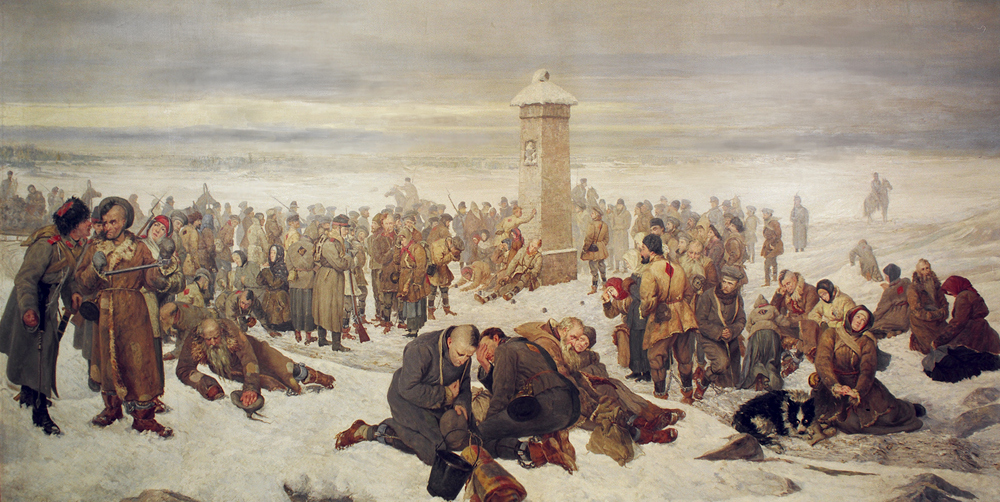
Farewell to Europe, by Aleksander Sochaczewski. The artist himself is among the exiled here, near the obelisk, on the right.

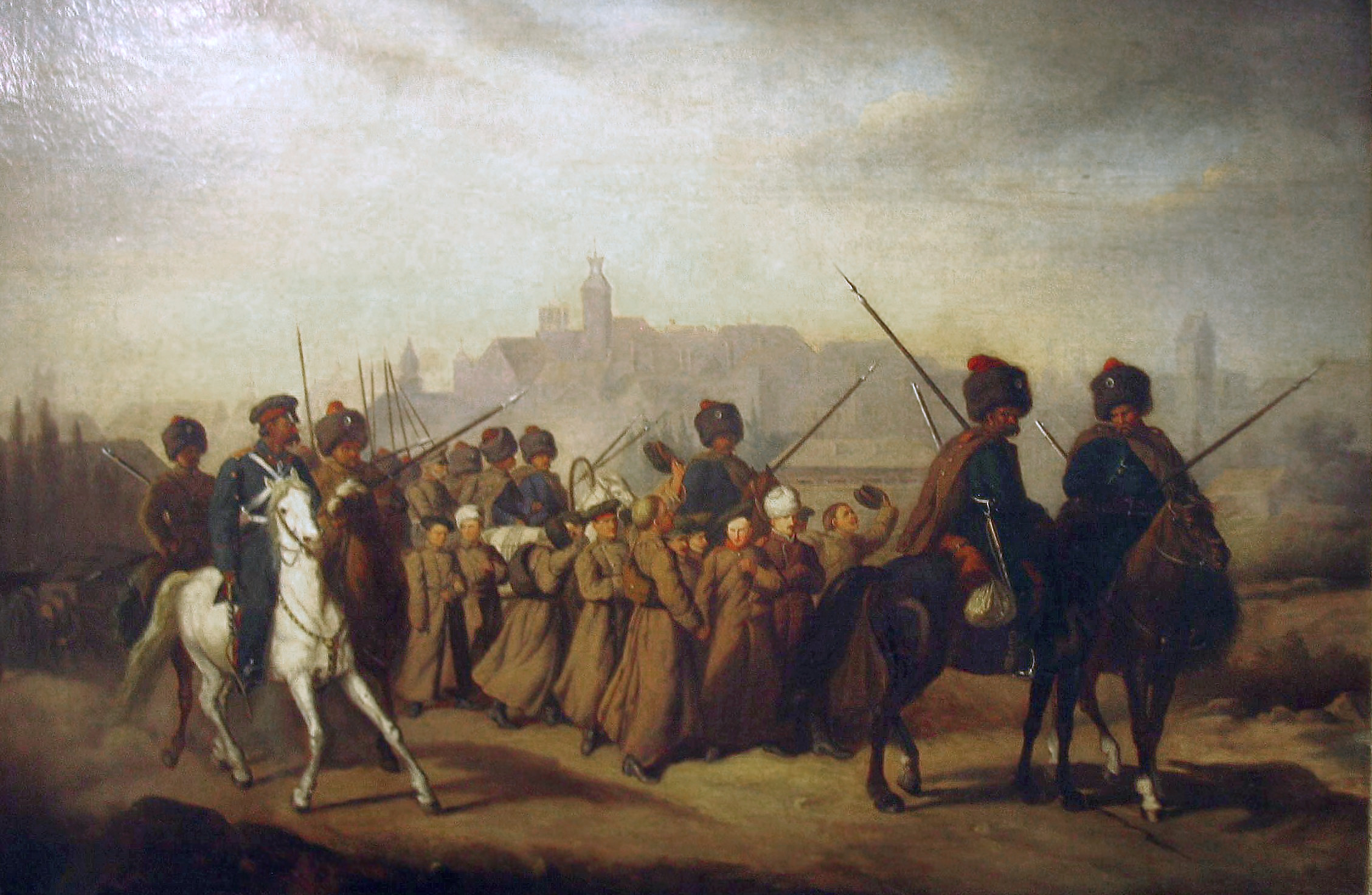
One of Sochaczewski' works, entitled "Branka" (1863).

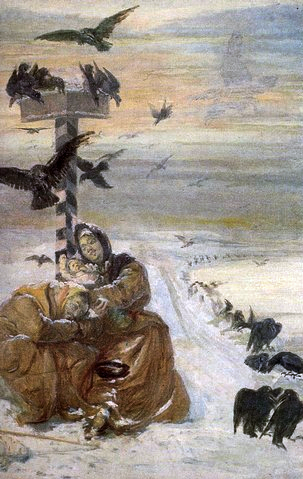
A painting demonstrating exiles trying to escape camp.

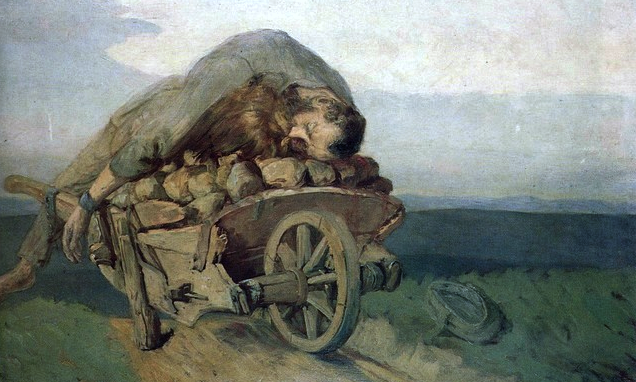
Death on the Barrow.

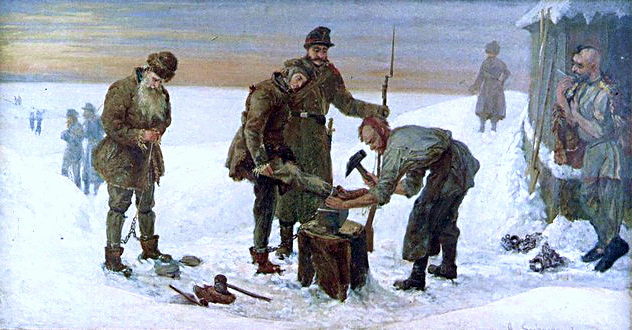
Sochaczewski's painting depicting the applying of handcuffs in the Siberian camps.

== Family ==
His daughter was the scientist and author Annie Francé-Harrar.
