= Kumshatske =

Kumshatske Кумшацьке
- Rural settlement
- Location within Ukraine
- Coordinates: 48°12′25″N 38°30′22″E
- Country: Ukraine
- Oblast: Donetsk Oblast

Population (2001 census)
  - Total: 158
- Time zone: UTC+2 (EET)
  - Summer (DST): UTC+3 (EEST)
- Postal code: 86220
- Area code: +380 6255

Kumshatske (Ukrainian: Кумшацьке) is a rural settlement in Horlivka Raion, Donetsk Oblast, eastern Ukraine. As of 2001 it had a population of 158 people.
