= Polevoy, Novoanninsky District, Volgograd Oblast =

Polevoy Полевой
- Settlement
- Location within Volgograd Oblast Location within Russia
- Coordinates: 50°43′N 42°38′E
- Country: Russia
- Region: Volgograd Oblast
- District: Novoanninsky District
- Time zone: UTC+4:00

Polevoy (Russian: Полевой) is a rural locality (a settlement) and the administrative center of Polevoye Rural Settlement, Novoanninsky District, Volgograd Oblast, Russia. The population was 355 as of 2010. There are 12 streets.

== Geography ==
Polevoy is located on the Khopyorsko-Buzulukskaya Plain, 24 km north of Novoanninsky (the district's administrative centre) by road. Zvezdka is the nearest rural locality.
