= Polevoy (surname) =

Polevoy (Russian: Полево́й; also transcribed Polevoi) is a Russian and Ukrainian surname. The female form may be written as Polevaya, or, in Ukrainian, Poleva.

Notable persons:

- Boris Nikolaevich Polevoy (1908–1981), Soviet writer
- Boris Petrovich Polevoy (1918–2002), Soviet and Russian historian
- Victoria Poleva (born 1962), Ukrainian composer
- Nikolai Polevoy (1796–1846), Russian editor, writer, and historian
