= Polevoye, Altai Krai =

Polevoye Полевое
- Village
- Location within Altai Krai Location within Russia
- Coordinates: 53°22′N 79°13′E
- Country: Russia
- Region: Altai Krai
- District: Nemetsky National District
- Time zone: UTC+7:00

Polevoye (Russian: Полевое) is a rural locality (a selo) and the administrative center of Polevsky Selsoviet of Nemetsky National District, Altai Krai, Russia. The population was 1134 as of 2016. There are 7 streets.

== Geography ==
Polevoye is located within the Kulunda Plain, 29 km northeast of Galbshtadt (the district's administrative centre) by road. Protasovo is the nearest rural locality.

== Ethnicity ==
The village is inhabited by Russians, Germans and others.
