= Kedrovy Urban Okrug =

Location of Krasnoyarsk Krai in Russia

Location of Tomsk Oblast in Russia

Kedrovy Urban Okrug is the name of several municipal formations in Russia. The following administrative divisions are incorporated as such:

- Settlement of Kedrovy, Krasnoyarsk Krai
- Kedrovy Town Under Oblast Jurisdiction, Tomsk Oblast

== See also ==
- Kedrovy (disambiguation)
