= Polevaya, Vladimir Oblast =

Polevaya Полевая
- Village
- Location within Vladimir Oblast Location within Russia
- Coordinates: 56°27′N 41°22′E
- Country: Russia
- Region: Vladimir Oblast
- District: Kovrovsky District
- Time zone: UTC+3:00

Polevaya (Russian: Полевая) is a rural locality (a village) in Malyginskoye Rural Settlement, Kovrovsky District, Vladimir Oblast, Russia. The population was 12 as of 2010.

== Geography ==
Polevaya is located 20 km north of Kovrov (the district's administrative centre) by road. Panyukino is the nearest rural locality.
