= Polevoye, Amur Oblast =

Polevoye Полевое
- Selo
- Location within Amur Oblast Location within Russia
- Coordinates: 50°40′N 128°01′E
- Country: Russia
- Region: Amur Oblast
- District: Ivanovsky District
- Time zone: UTC+9:00

Polevoye (Russian: Полевое) is a rural locality (a selo) in Novoivanovsky Selsoviet of Ivanovsky District, Amur Oblast, Russia. The population was 82 as of 2018. There are 3 streets.

== Geography ==
Polevoye is located 49 km north of Ivanovka (the district's administrative centre) by road. Srednebelaya is the nearest rural locality.
