= Dubinino, Bashkortostan =

Dubinino Дубинино
- Selo
- Location within Bashkortostan Location within Russia
- Coordinates: 54°02′N 57°46′E
- Country: Russia
- Region: Bashkortostan
- District: Beloretsky District
- Time zone: UTC+5:00

Dubinino (Russian: Дубинино) is a rural locality (a selo) in Inzersky Selsoviet, Beloretsky District, Bashkortostan, Russia. The population was 45 as of 2010. There are 5 streets.

== Geography ==
Dubinino is located 62 km northwest of Beloretsk (the district's administrative centre) by road. Yusha is the nearest rural locality.
