= Selenginsk =

Selenginsk Селенгинск
- Urban-type settlement

Other transcription(s)
  - Buryat: Сэлэнгын
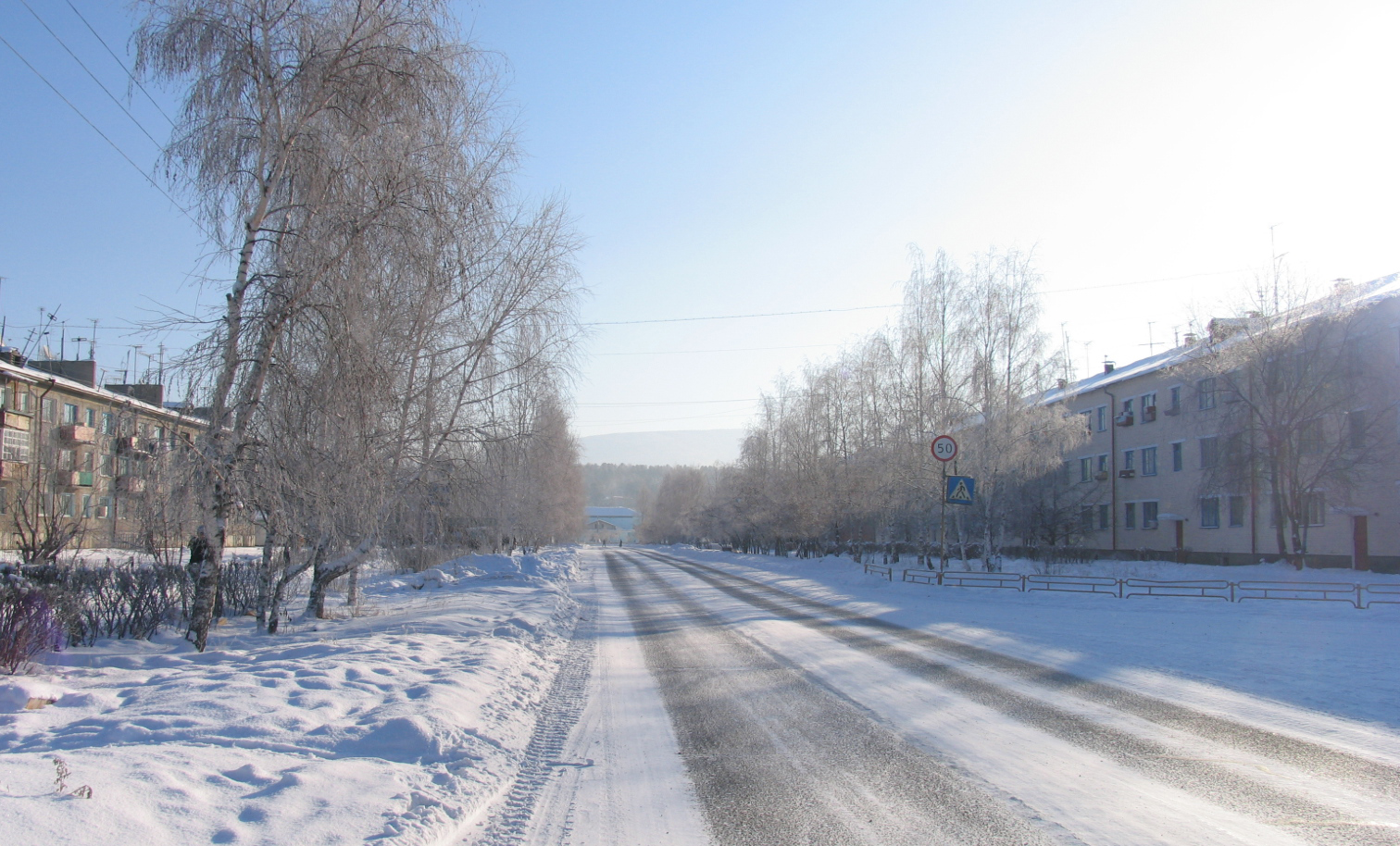
- Stroiteley Avenue is the central street of Selenginsk
- Interactive map of Selenginsk
- Location of Selenginsk Selenginsk (Republic of Buryatia)
- Coordinates: 52°01′N 106°52′E
- Country: Russia
- Federal subject: Buryatia
- Administrative district: Kabansky District
- Urban-type settlementSelsoviet: Selenginsk Urban-Type Settlement
- Founded: 1961
- Elevation: 478 m (1,568 ft)

Population (2010 Census)
  - Total: 14,546
  - Estimate (2025): 13,075 (−10.1%)

Administrative status
  - Capital of: Selenginsk Urban-Type Settlement

Municipal status
  - Municipal district: Kabansky Municipal District
  - Urban settlement: Selenginskoye Urban Settlement
  - Capital of: Selenginskoye Urban Settlement
- Time zone: UTC+8 (MSK+5)
- Postal code: 671247
- OKTMO ID: 81624163051

Selenginsk population
- 2010 Census: 14,546
- 2002 Census: 16,326
- 1989 Census: 15,233
- 1979 Census: 13,000

Selenginsk (Russian: Селенги́нск; Buryat: Сэлэнгын, Selengyn, Mongolian: Сэлэнгэ, Selenge) is an urban locality (an urban-type settlement) in Kabansky District of the Republic of Buryatia, Russia, located at the head of the Selenga River delta about 30 kilometers (19 mi) from Lake Baikal and about 50 kilometers (31 mi) northwest of Ulan-Ude, the capital of the republic. As of the 2010 Census, its population was 14,546.

== Administrative and municipal status ==
Within the framework of administrative divisions, the urban-type settlement (inhabited locality) of Selenginsk is incorporated within Kabansky District as Selenginsk Urban-Type Settlement (an administrative division of the district). As a municipal division, Selenginsk Urban-Type Settlement is incorporated within Kabansky Municipal District as Selenginskoye Urban Settlement.

== Transportation ==
Selenginsk stands on the Trans-Siberian Railway and the Trans-Siberian Highway.
