= Slavne, Horlivka Raion, Donetsk Oblast =

Slavne Славное
- Rural settlement
- Location within Ukraine
- Coordinates: 48°12′37″N 38°19′39″E
- Country: Ukraine
- Oblast: Donetsk Oblast
- Founded: 1782

Population (2001 census)
  - Total: 249
  - Density: 2,653/km^{2} (6,870/sq mi)
- Time zone: UTC+2 (EET)
  - Summer (DST): UTC+3 (EEST)
- Postal code: 86200
- Area code: +380 6250

Slavne (Ukrainian: Славне; Russian: Славное, romanized: Slavnoye), is a rural settlement in Horlivka Raion, Donetsk Oblast, eastern Ukraine. The settlement is located about 60 kilometres (37 mi) from the oblast's administrative center, Donetsk.

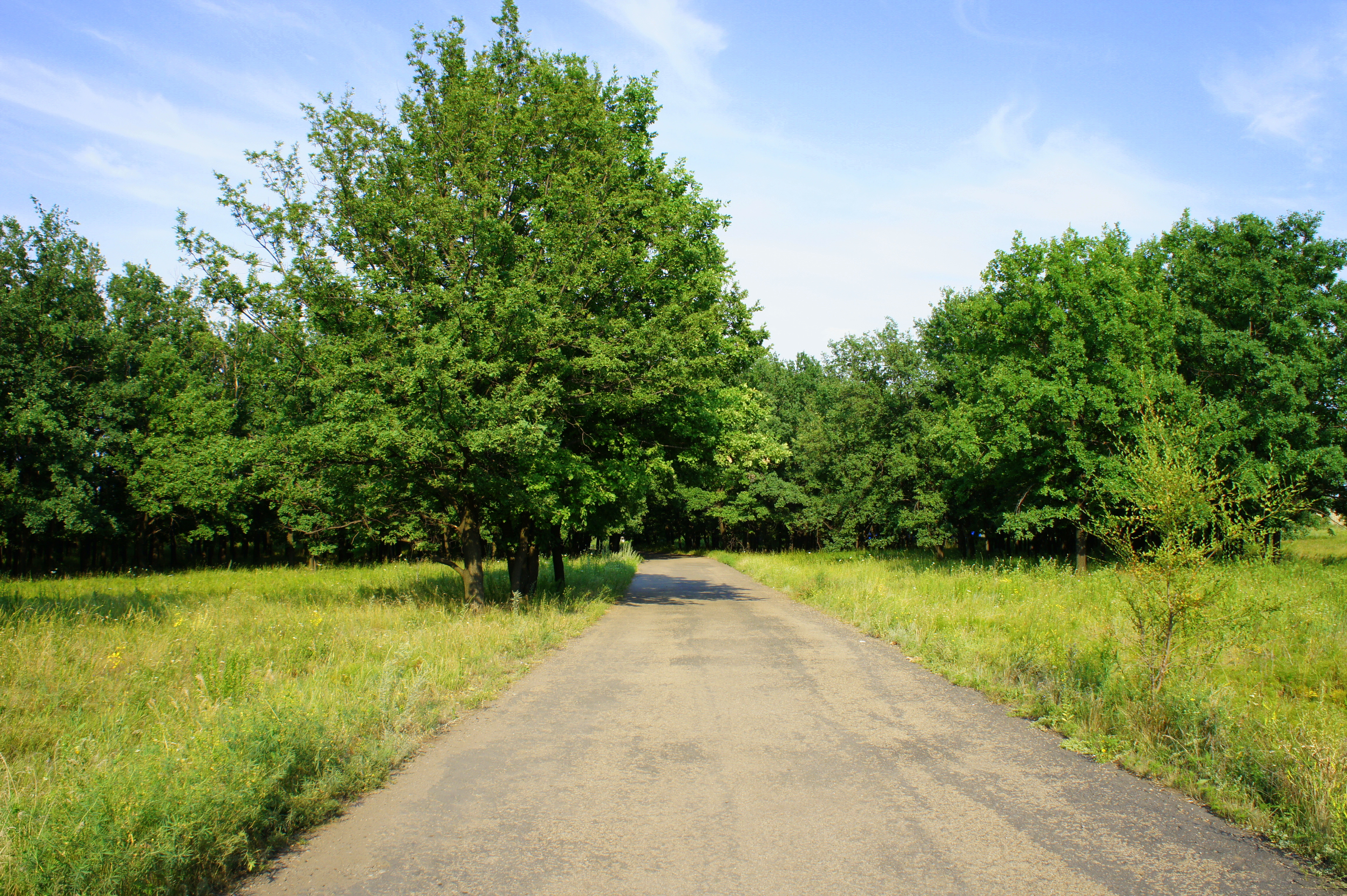
The main road to Slavne village
