= Polove =

Polove Польове
- Rural settlement
- Location within Ukraine
- Coordinates: 48°12′23″N 38°27′40″E
- Country: Ukraine
- Oblast: Donetsk Oblast

Population (2001 census)
  - Total: 155
- Time zone: UTC+2 (EET)
  - Summer (DST): UTC+3 (EEST)
- Postal code: 86200
- Area code: +380 6255

Polove (Ukrainian: Польове) is a rural settlement in Horlivka Raion, Donetsk Oblast, eastern Ukraine. As of 2001 it had a population of 155 people.
