= Kabansk =

Kabansk Кабанск
- Selo
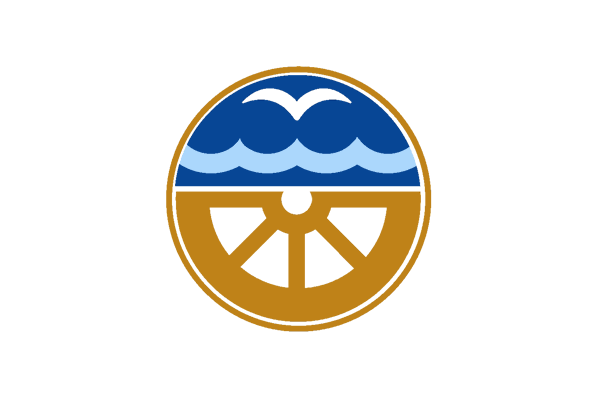
- Flag Coat of arms
- Interactive map of Kabansk
- Location of Kabansk Kabansk (Republic of Buryatia)
- Coordinates: 52°03′12″N 106°39′30″E
- Country: Russia
- Federal subject: Buryatia
- Administrative district: Kabansky District
- SelsovietSelsoviet: Kabansky
- Founded: 1678
- Elevation: 469 m (1,539 ft)

Population (2010 Census)
  - Total: 6,038
  - Estimate (2021): 5,653 (−6.4%)

Administrative status
  - Capital of: Kabansky District, Kabansky Selsoviet

Municipal status
  - Municipal district: Kabansky Municipal District
  - Rural settlement: Kabanskoye Rural Settlement
  - Capital of: Kabansky Municipal District, Kabanskoye Rural Settlement
- Time zone: UTC+8 (MSK+5)
- Postal code: 671200
- OKTMO ID: 81624430101

Kabansk (Russian: Каба́нск, Buryat and Mongolian: Хабаан, Khabaan) is a rural locality (a selo) and the administrative center of Kabansky District of the Republic of Buryatia, Russia. Population: 6,038 (2010 census); 6,373 (2002 census); 6,620 (1989 Soviet census).
