= Kabansky District =

Kabansky District Кабанский район (Russian)
- District

Other transcription(s)
  - Buryat: Хабаансхын аймаг
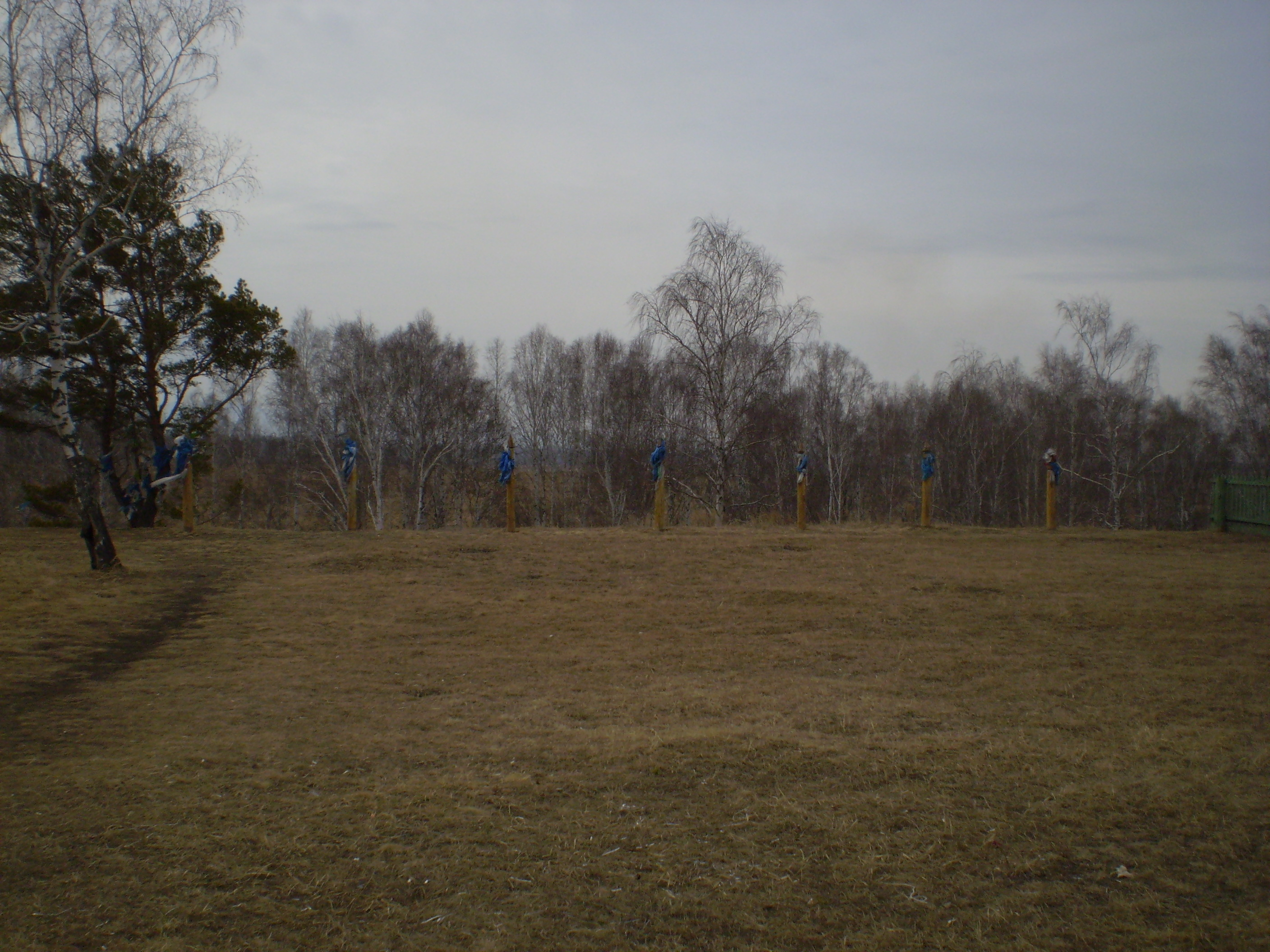
- Fofanovsky Acropolis, a Neolithic burial grounds in Kabansky District

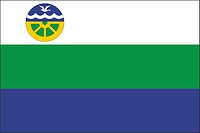
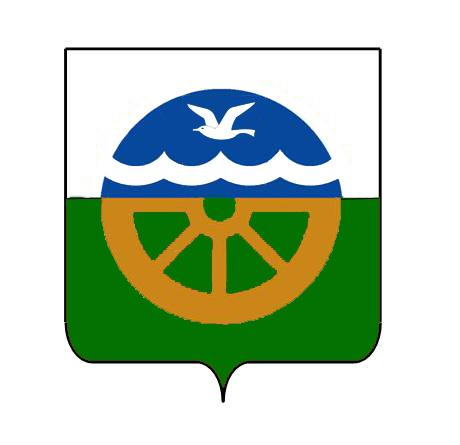
- Flag Coat of arms
- Location of Kabansky District in the Buryat Republic
- Coordinates: 52°02′N 106°39′E
- Country: Russia
- Federal subject: Republic of Buryatia
- Established: 26 September 1927
- Administrative center: Kabansk

Area
  - Total: 13,470 km^{2} (5,200 sq mi)

Population (2010 Census)
  - Total: 59,883
  - Density: 4.446/km^{2} (11.51/sq mi)
  - Urban: 45.9%
  - Rural: 54.1%

Administrative structure
  - Administrative divisions: 1 Towns, 2 Urban-type settlements, 13 Selsoviets, 1 Somons
  - Inhabited localities: 1 cities/towns, 2 urban-type settlements, 59 rural localities

Municipal structure
  - Municipally incorporated as: Kabansky Municipal District
  - Municipal divisions: 3 urban settlements, 16 rural settlements
- Time zone: UTC+8 (MSK+5)
- OKTMO ID: 81624000
- Website: http://kabansk.org

Population of Kabansky District
- 2010 Census: 59,883
- 2002 Census: 65,624
- 1989 Census: 68,820
- 1979 Census: 64,962

Kabansky District (Russian: Каба́нский райо́н; Buryat: Хабаансхын аймаг, Khabaanskhyn aimag) is an administrative and municipal district (raion), one of the twenty-one in the Republic of Buryatia, Russia. It is located in the center of the republic. The area of the district is 13,470 square kilometers (5,200 sq mi). Its administrative center is the rural locality (a selo) of Kabansk. As of the 2010 Census, the total population of the district was 59,883, with the population of Kabansk accounting for 10.1% of that number.

== Administrative and municipal status ==
Within the framework of administrative divisions, Kabansky District is one of the twenty-one in the Republic of Buryatia. It is divided into one town (an administrative division with the administrative center in the town (an inhabited locality) of Babushkin), two urban-type settlements (administrative divisions with the administrative centers, correspondingly, in the urban-type settlements (inhabited localities) of Kamensk and Selenginsk), thirteen selsoviets, and one somon, all of which comprise fifty-nine rural localities. As a municipal division, the district is incorporated as Kabansky Municipal District. The town (without its rural localities) and the two urban-type settlements are incorporated as three urban settlements, and the thirteen selsoviets, one somon, and the rural localities of the Town of Babushkin are incorporated as sixteen rural settlements within the municipal district. The selo of Kabansk serves as the administrative center of both the administrative and municipal district.
