= A370 =

A370 may refer to:

- A370 highway (Russia), a road in Russia that forms part of the Trans-Siberian Highway
- A370 road, a road in Bristol and Somerset, England
