= Ussuri (disambiguation) =

Ussuri usually refers to the Ussuri River, a river in the east of Northeast China and south of the Russian Far East, but may also refer to:

- Ussuri Bay, a northern east part of Peter the Great Gulf
- Ussuri krai
- Ussuri Railway
- Ussuri Highway, M60 highway (Russia)
- Ussuri tiger, the Siberian or Amur tiger (Panthera tigris altaica)
