= Terra Circa =

Motorcycle Adventure television series

- Genre: Motorcycle Adventure television series
- Created by: Dave Greenhough
- Directed by: Austin Vince
- Starring: Dave Greenhough; Charlie Benner; Austin Vince; Gerald Vince; Matt Hill; Joe McManus
- No. of episodes: 6

Production
- Executive producer: Ahmad Ahmadzadeh
- Production company: Aimimage Productions
- Budget: Tour:~ $10 000 per rider, self financed

Terra Circa is a television series created by Dave Greenhough.

== Premise ==
The Mondo Enduro round the world motorbike expedition attempted but did not cross the Zilov Gap in Central Siberia. In 2000 a follow-up expedition, Terra Circa, was organised by Dave Greenhough, brother of one of the Mondo Enduro team members. It was the first motorbike expedition to cross the infamous Zilov Gap.

The route went from London across Europe, western Russia and Siberia to Vladivostok. Terra Circa's original Eurasian destination was Magadan, but injuries and logistical difficulties forced them to reroute towards Vladivostok. The team then embarked for Japan and returned to Europe crossing the United States. It took 7 months and they drove 20 000 miles.

The members were: Dave Greenhough (organizer), Austin Vince, Charlie Benner, Gerald Vince, Joe MacManus (until Turkey), and Matt Hill (until Turkey and then from Russia). Dave Greenhough had to leave early because of a knee injury, and Matt Hill jumped in again (he had left the expedition in Turkey with Joe MacManus) to finish with the others.

Like its predecessor, Terra Circa is a shoestring expedition with rough camping the order of the day and has a cult following amongst adventure motorcyclists.

The expedition was filmed and made into a six-part TV series, shown on British cable channel Men & Motors.

== Episodes ==
Note that this list is not complete, as the episodes are scarce on the city names the expedition drove through.

No.	Title	Route
1	"London to Italy"	London (Mill Hill School) - Dover - (Ferry) - Northern France - Verdun - Zurich - Pisa - Pompeii - Brindisi - (Ferry to Greece)
Off road training in Wales and prepping the bikes. With only £70 a week, it's cooking on campfires, sleeping under the stars and mending the bikes at the side of the road.
2	"Greece to Volgograd"	Igoumenitsa - Northern Greece - Istanbul - Erzurum (Planned route to Kazakhstan was via Iran and Turkmenistan, but Iran consulate at Erzurum did not issue any kind of Visas to Terra Circa expedition) - Samsun (Joe and Matt go back) - (Black Sea Ro-ro ferry) - Novorossiysk (Dave's knee injury) - Volgograd
A run-in with the Turkish police, 1500 miles of wheatfield steppe, and a model called Elenne Borkachovka in Stalin's Riviera city
3	"Kazakhstan"	Border crossing to Kazakhstan - Uralsk (not referred to) - Aralsk - Shymkent (not referred to) - Almaty (Dave goes back home and Matt re-joins the team) - Race to the border to Russia via Semey, Kazakhstan
Fuel crises, engine meltdowns, and the worst road in Central Asia. Gerald gets stitches at the side of the road, and the team meet a Kazakh hero. One flies home with a crippled knee.
4	"Russia"	Arriving from Semey Terra Circa takes the shortest path towards east, including Barnaul - Belovo (group picture taken on the city name) - Kemerovo - Krasnojarsk - (Long Russia travel with no town names) - Irkutsk (local bikers and Terra Circa visits Lake Baikal icebreaker Angara) - (Dominic joins and then leaves) - (More Russia)
'The belly of the bear'. Days of endless forest, before the crazy town of Irkutsk where Terra Circa brush with local biker gang 'The Storm'
5	"The Zilov Gap"	Zilov Gap approaching - Chernyshevsk - (Matt breaks his collar bone) Erofey-Pavlovich - (Crossing the Zilov Gap)
400 miles of dirt track and trails. Terra Circa are the first bikers to drive continuously across Siberia without putting their bikes on the railway. But not all of them will make it..
6	"Japan"	(Leaving Russia to Japan from Vladivostok) - Toyama - Akashi Kaikyō Bridge - Skyrest New Muroto, an abandoned nightclub and pachinko parlor near Muroto - Kobi - Los Angeles - New York City
Custom officials refuse entry to the battered British bikes, so Terra Circa imports them as 'Hand Luggage'. Beach camps, mountain camps and paddy fields ...but nowhere to strike a camp.

== Music ==
Like Mondo Enduro Terra Circa has its own musical themes in every episode. Some of the music is performed and composed by Austin Vince and his band. Other musical inserts are from the Black Moses: "Slow Mama", "Strange Life" and The Greenhornes: "Good Time", "Stay Away Girl". Abandoned viewpoint in Japan has Syd Dales "Walrus And The Carpenter" playing as a musical theme.
