= AH30 =

Asian Highway in Russia

Asian Highway AH30
- AH30 in red
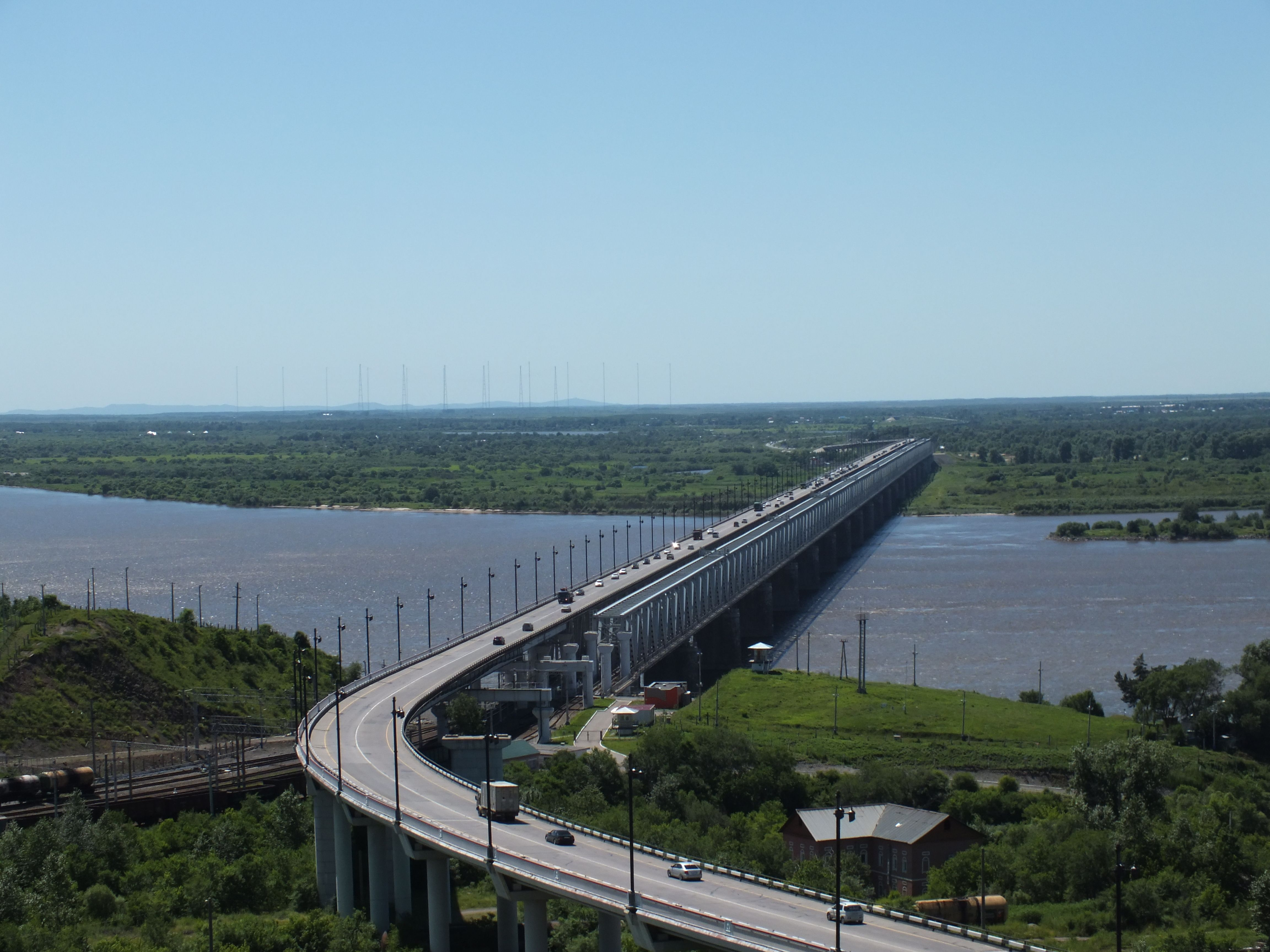
- Khabarovsk Bridge over Amur River on AH30

Route information
- Length: 2,785 km (1,731 mi)

Major junctions
- South end: Ussuriysk, Primorsky Krai
- AH31 Belogorsk
- North end: Chita, Zabaykalsky Krai

Location
- Country: Russia

Highway system
- Russian Federal Highways
← AH26	→ AH31

Asian Highway 30 (or AH30) is a route located in Russia, running 2,785 kilometres (1,731 mi) from Ussuriysk, Primorsky Krai to Chita, Zabaykalsky Krai. The Khabarovsk to Chita section of route is called the Amur Highway, named after the adjacent Amur river.

== Route ==
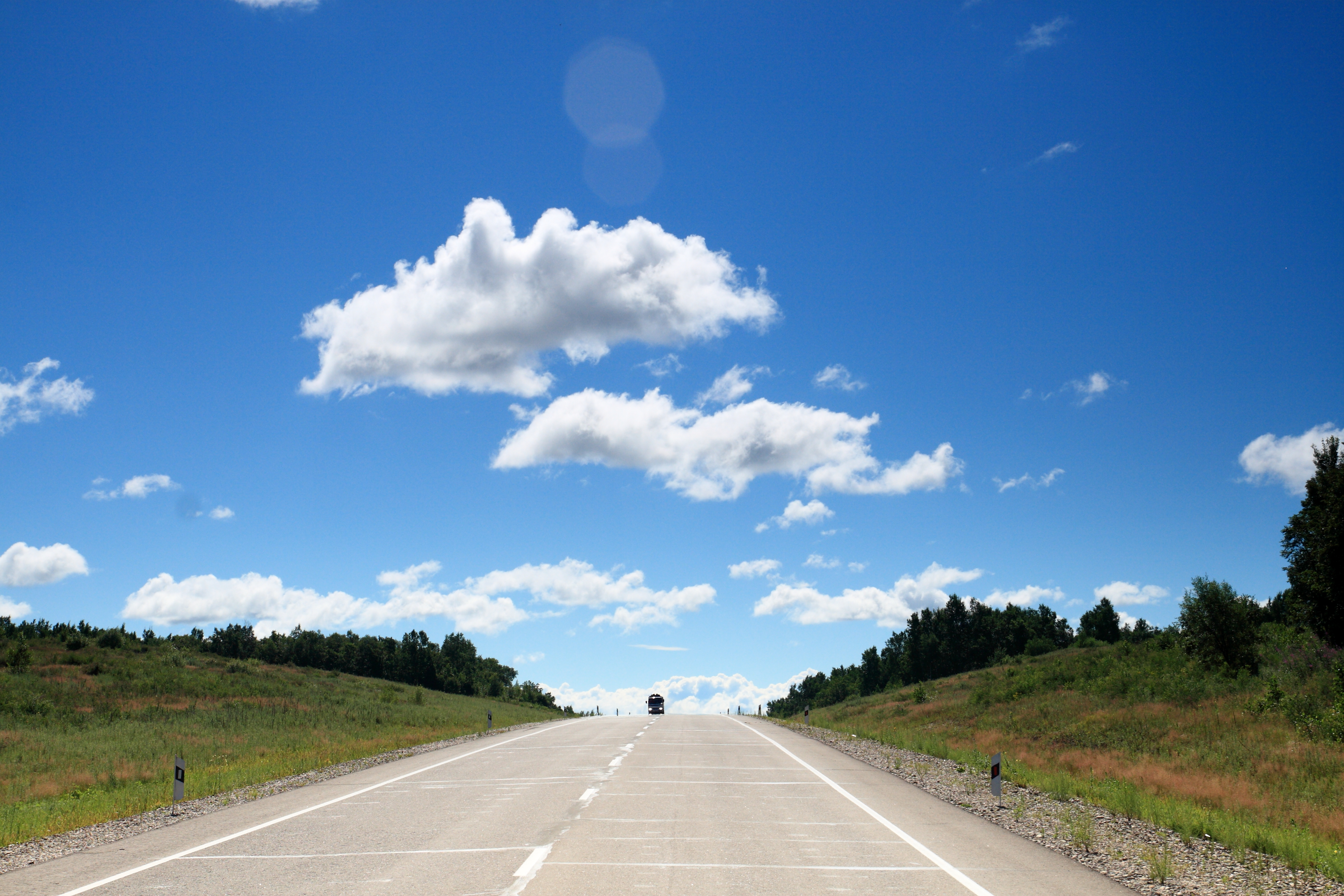
Amur Highway in Bureysky District

- A 370: Ussuriysk - Khabarovsk 641 km (398 mi)
- R 297: Khabarovsk - Birobidzhan - Arkhara - Svobodny - Never - Chita 2,144 km (1,332 mi)

== Junctions ==
AH6 near Ussuriysk
AH31 near Belogorsk
AH6 near Chita

== See also ==
- The Amur Highway
- The Asian Highway Network
- Asian Highway 6
- List of Asian Highways
