= Lois Pryce =

British travel writer

- Born: January 13, 1973 (age 53); Aberdeen, UK
- Spouse: Austin Vince
- Website: Official website

Lois Pryce (born 13 January 1973) is a British travel writer, journalist and a founder/curator of the Adventure Travel Film Festival. She is the author of Lois on the Loose, Red Tape & White Knuckles and Revolutionary Ride, travel memoirs about her solo motorcycle journeys through the Americas, Africa and Iran.

== Early life ==
She was born in Aberdeen but grew up in Bristol. She has lived in London since 1992.

== Career ==
She worked in the music industry in London until April 2003 when she left her position at BBC Music to make a 10-month solo motorcycle journey of approximately 20,000 miles from Alaska to Tierra del Fuego, Argentina. This resulted in her first book, Lois on the Loose, which was published in the UK in 2007 by Arrow, an imprint of Random House, and in the USA by Thomas Dunne Books, an imprint of St. Martin's Press. It has also been translated into German, Dutch and Italian. It is currently published in the USA by Lee Klancher's Octane Press. The Telegraph said it "Roars along at a breakneck pace and is full of snappy accounts and funny asides."

In 2006 she made her second long-distance solo motorcycle expedition from London to Cape Town, a journey of approximately 10,000 miles. Her route involved crossing the Sahara and traversing the Congo Basin and Angola. Her book about this trip, Red Tape & White Knuckles, was published in 2008 in the UK by Arrow/Random House, in the USA by Octane Press and in Germany by Dumont. It was excerpted in The New York Times where it was described as "Breezy and upbeat ... enough to make readers reach for their helmets and aim for a remote part of the globe".

In 2013 and 2014 she made two solo motorcycle tours of Iran, which is the subject of her third book, Revolutionary Ride, published in 2017 in the UK and USA by Nicholas Brealey/Hodder and in Germany by Dumont. It was shortlisted for Adventure Book of the Year in the 2018 Edward Stanford Travel Writing Awards.

Pryce's expeditions and assignments have taken to her over sixty countries. The Telegraph listed her as one of "Ten Great Female Travellers" for International Women's Day 2015.

She is a fellow of The Royal Literary Fund and contributes regularly to various publications in the UK and the USA. Her writing has appeared in The Observer, The Telegraph, The New York Times, The Guardian, The Independent and CNN. She is a contributing editor to the US travel magazine, Overland Journal and worked as the travel/adventure editor for Bike Magazine from 2016 to 2020. She is a regular contributor to the long-running BBC Radio programme, From Our Own Correspondent and was previously the travel consultant on BBC Radio 5 Live's 'Up All Night' programme.

She is also the co-founder and curator of The Adventure Travel Film Festival with her husband, the long-distance motorcyclist and film-maker Austin Vince. The festival takes place annually in England, Scotland and Australia.

== Personal life ==
Lois is married to round-the-world motorcyclist and film-maker, Austin Vince.

She is an inland waterways enthusiast and owns a classic Dutch sailing barge.

She is the banjo player in the all-female bluegrass band, The Jolenes from 2008 to 2018 and now plays the banjo in The Sisters & The Brothers.

She is the great granddaughter of Nobel Prize-winning physicist, Max Born and first cousin once removed to Olivia Newton-John and third cousin once removed to Ben Elton.

== Bibliography ==
=== 2007 ===
Lois on the Loose published by Arrow/Random House (UK) and Octane Press (USA)

Published in Germany as Vollgas (Ullstein Verlag)

Published as Lois Onderweg in the Netherlands (Sirene)

Published as Verso Ushuaia in Italy (RideRTW)

=== 2008 ===
Red Tape & White Knuckles published by Arrow/Random House (UK) and Octane Press (USA)

Published in Germany as Mit 80 Schutzengeln durch Afrika by Dumont

=== 2017 ===
Revolutionary Ride published by Nicholas Brealey/Hodder (UK & USA)

Published in Germany as Im Iran dürfen Frauen nicht Motorrad fahren by Dumont, translated by Monika Baark
