= Austin Vince =

English motorcycle rider

Austin Vince is best known for his long distance adventure motorcycle expeditions: twice round the world as part of the Mondo Enduro and Terra Circa trips, which were both produced as TV documentaries.

As well as presenting the Mondo Enduro and co-presenting the Terra Circa TV programmes, Vince has also written and presented the Routes series on Discovery Channel. Latterly he played the maths teacher in the first two series of Channel 4's That'll Teach 'Em and has in the past taught at St. Johns Northwood as a maths teacher. He has also served in the Royal Engineers.

Vince attended the private Mill Hill School in North London then was sponsored through university by the army but became a pacifist while there and had to pay them to get out. After university, he returned to Mill Hill as a teacher and used to teach at St. Johns School in Northwood. He is married to long distance female motorcyclist Lois Pryce, who has completed several notable expeditions of her own. He returned for a second stint at St Johns School in Northwood before leaving in 2016 to pursue his passion for motorcycle adventure trips (mini mondos) in the Pyrenees.

== Books ==
- Vince, Austin; Bloom, Louis et al. (2006) Mondo Enduro. Ripping Yarns.com. ISBN 1-904466-28-1.
