= That'll Teach 'Em =

British television series (2003–2006)

- Also known as: That'll Teach 'Em Too (2004); That'll Teach 'Em: Boys Versus Girls (2005–06)
- Genre: Documentary; Reality TV
- Created by: Simon Rockell
- Narrated by: John Sessions (Series 1); Paul McGann (Series 2); Richard E. Grant (Series 3)
- Composer: Daniel Pemberton
- Country of origin: United Kingdom
- Original language: English
- No. of series: 3
- No. of episodes: 15

Production
- Running time: 60 minutes (including advertisements)
- Production company: Twenty Twenty Television

Original release
- Network: Channel 4
- Release: 5 August 2003 – 2 May 2006

That'll Teach 'Em is a British historical reality documentary series produced by Twenty Twenty Television for the Channel 4 network in the United Kingdom.

== Concept ==
Each series follows around 30 teenage students who have recently completed their GCSEs as they are taken back to a 1950s/1960s style British boarding school. The show sets out to analyse whether the standards that were integral to the school life of the time could help to produce better exam results, when compared to the current GCSE results and to compare certain contemporary educational methods with modern ones (e.g. vocational vs. academic focus for the less "gifted").

As part of the experience, the participants are expected to board at a traditional school house, abiding by strict discipline, adopting to 1950s/1960s diet and following a strict uniform dress code, the only difference being the absence of corporal punishment as it was made illegal in all state schools in Britain in 1986, and in all private schools in England and Wales in 1998. Because of that, other strict punishments, most notably writing lines and essays and holding up heavy items for a certain amount of time were used instead. Throughout the series, a number of students have either been expelled for misconduct, or have chosen to leave the school voluntarily.

After four weeks, the students then take their final exams, produced to the same standard as contemporary GCE O Levels and CSEs.

There were three series of the show, the first airing in August 2003 (recreating a 1950s grammar school and featuring academically high-achieving pupils), the second in August 2004 (a 1960s secondary modern and the pupils academically average or poor), and the third and final series in April 2006 (a 1950s grammar school with high-achieving pupils again, this time focusing on practical sciences and with single-sex classes).

== Series overview ==
=== Series 1 (2003) ===
The first series of the show was filmed over 4 weeks in July and August 2003, at the Royal Grammar School, High Wycombe. It featured 15 boys and 15 girls who had just sat their GCSEs and mostly did well, though some failed. The school was branded as "King's School".

Known Teachers	Subject
Mr Andrew MacTavish	Headmaster
Mr Tony Perry	Deputy Head/Housemaster/Science
Miss Pat Crowe	Matron/Housemistress
Mr Peter Daplyn	Gym/Disciplinarian/Shower-Master
Mr Geoffrey Heath	Music
Dr Elizabeth Pidoux	English/Housemistress
Mr Simon Rockell	History
Mr Austin Vince	Mathematics/CCF (Combined Cadet Force)
Mr Simon Warr	Latin/French/Housemaster

Boys	Girls
Harry Elgood	Clare Dery
Nic Hall	Seraphina Evans
Colum Hughes	Nichola Greenhalgh
Freddie Hutchins	Henrietta Haines
Tom Jewell	Victoria Julien
Richard Mylles	Hina Khan
Rajay Naik	Kathryn McGeough (Head Girl)
Blaine Pike	Holly McGuire
Ryan Smithson	Emma Pinchbeck
Andrew Stratton (Head Boy)	Harriet Rykens
Matthew Sweeney	Hannah Smith
Ali Unwin	Frances Weaver
Simon Waller	Tarot Wells
Andy Walne	Rebecca Woodward
Joe McCready	Nadia Freeman

Joe McCready was expelled during the series for persistent bad behaviour and disrespect towards several staff members. Nadia Freeman chose to leave the school voluntarily owing to the food. In episode 4, Mr. Perry served as acting headmaster owing to Mr. MacTavish being unwell at the time.

=== Series 2 (2004) ===
The second series of the show, called That'll Teach 'Em Too, was also filmed at the Royal Grammar School, High Wycombe in August 2004 and was known as "Hope Green Secondary Modern". This was the only series set in the 1960s.

Known Teachers	Subject
Mr Richard Fawcett	Headmaster/Geography
Mr Maurice Pirotte	Deputy Head/Housemaster/Rural Science
Miss Jeanette Gibson	English/Housemistress/Pianist
Mr Lee Austin	Gym/Disciplinarian
Mr Andre Baker	Wrestling
Mr Barnes	Chief Examiner/Test Tutor
Miss Pat Crowe	Matron/Housemistress
Ms Jackie Dunn	Needlework
Ms Janet Faherty	Dance
Mr Neil Garner	Guitarist/Music
Miss Kirby-Jones	Home Economics Examiner
Mrs Cherilyn Lloyd-Jones	Domestic Science/Home Economics/Cookery
Mr John Nosworthy	Bricklaying
Mr Francis Peacock	History and Tutor
Mr Thomas Smith	Woodwork
Mr Austin Vince	Mathematics/Automotive/Scouts/Tutor
Mrs Cornelia Welham	Touch Typing/Religious Studies

Boys	Girls
Perry Goyen (Head Boy)	Stevie Harman (Head Girl)
Ben Barber	Emily Apari
Andrew Brown	Hannah Benjamin
Josh Davis	Charlotte Difone
Adam Doyle	Avril Hardy
Daniel Gallagher	Nikki Hollingworth
Luke Graham	Maureen Islam
Harvey Herdman	Rosie Knight
Christopher Hobin	Kasi Kulon
Shina Oniwinde	Charlotte Neild
Alex Roberts	Sara Roadknight
Harry Rowe	Erin Tate
Franklin De Santi	Holly
Lewis Davis	Aliss Hadley
Ashley Cattermole	Sophia Madisonte

Sophia chose to leave the school voluntarily owing to her poor behaviour stemming from frequent clashes with multiple staff members, and out of frustration over the school's disciplinary enforcement. Though it was never shown, Aliss Hadley, Lewis Davis and Holly had left for unknown reasons. This was the only series in which no students were expelled. Most students passed only 1 CSE. As with Series 1, 15 boys and 15 girls entered the school at the start, and 26 finished.

=== Series 3 (2005–06) ===
Series 3 called That'll Teach 'Em: Boys Versus Girls was filmed during August 2005 at St Joseph's College in Ipswich, and broadcast during the following April. The series returned to the setting of a 1950s grammar school. The school was branded as "Charles Darwin Grammar" and focused predominantly on practical sciences. It also experimented with boys and girls being taught separately. The languages teacher in series 1, Simon Warr, took on the role of headmaster in Series 3.

Known Teachers	Subject
Mr Simon 'S.R.' Warr	Headmaster/Classical civilisation
Mr James Williams	Deputy Head/Housemaster/Biology
Miss Jeanette Gibson	English/Art
Mr David Stanley	Music/Tutor/Disciplinarian
Dr Andrew Szydlo	Chemistry
Dr Peter Wilde	Physics/Housemaster
Miss Anabelle Bryant	Housemistress/Gym (Girls)
Miss Carter	Mathematics/Tutor/Housemistress
Miss Pat Crowe	Matron/Disciplinarian
Mr Tomms	Gym (Boys)
Sgt Greg Allen	CCF (Combined Cadet Force)
Mrs Turner	Laboratory Assistant

Boys	Girls
Rob Hudson (Head Boy)	Victoria Buxton (first Head Girl)
Nathan Anidugbe	Sally Rushton (second Head Girl)
Philip Donald	Jessica Boulton
Hugh Gilroy	Francesca Bruce
Brennon Gunston	Anna Clift
Chris Hedley	Hollie Dearman
William Ho	Kayleigh Durman
James Ingram	Amy Jampa-Ngoen
Sebastian Jefford	Ruby Lally
John Kemple	Rosie Morton
Luke Mills	Jenny Ritzman
Scott Peters	Corrine Stewart
Michael Petkov	Meng-Yuan Sun
Qadeer Razaque	Ashleigh Walters
Joe Seath	Emily Williams
Simon Taylor	Samantha Wyvill

Scott Peters was expelled early on in the final week of term for persistent bad behaviour, disrespect, and refusing to participate in some areas of the school curriculum; particularly CCF. Three more students chose to leave voluntarily; Brennon Gunston left on the third day owing to homesickness; Rosie Morton left partway through the second week owing to her disgust of hygiene product prohibition; and Amy Jampa-Ngoen left early on in the third week owing to frustrations with the school's standards. Mr. Warr, however, gave Jampa-Ngoen his explicit blessing to leave; owing to her consistently poor conduct record. After failing to stop some girls from using the telephone in the laundry room, Victoria Buxton was demoted from her position as Head Girl by the end of the second week, and her role was filled by Sally Rushton. In addition, Brennon Gunston and Rosie Morton were replaced with Joe Seath and Francesca Bruce respectively. In the academic competition between the girls and the boys, the girls won overall, and most students managed to pass only one O Level.

==== That'll Test 'Em ====
For the third series, a spin-off series, That'll Test 'Em, aired on More4 after the main programme. It saw pupils featured in the That'll Teach 'Em episode just aired being quizzed in competition with their parents on topics that they should have known well after their time in 1950s/1960s education.

== International versions ==
The format from the series has been adapted in eight countries: France, Spain, Norway, Germany, Belgium, Italy, Netherlands and Russia. The international rights are distributed by DRG.

Country	Title	TV channel(s)	Seasons	Distribution
United Kingdom (original format)	That'll Teach 'Em	Channel 4	3	5 August 2003 – 2 September 2003; 17 August 2004 – 14 September 2004; 4 April 2006 – 2 May 2006
France	Le Pensionnat	M6	3	2 September 2004 – 7 October 2004; 1 September 2005 – 13 October 2005; 30 September 2013 – 21 October 2013
Norway	Internatet	TV Norge	1	14 September 2005 – 16 November 2005
Norway	Feriekolonien	TV Norge	1	11 January 2007 – 15 March 2007
Belgium (Flanders)	De Jeugd van Tegenwoordig	SBS; VT4	3	November 2006; 11 October 2007; 2008
Belgium (Flanders)	Dat Zal Ze Leren!	VTM	1	23 March 2011 – 18 May 2011
Netherlands	Dat Zal Ze Leren!	RTL 5	1	4 September 2006 – 30 October 2006
Spain	Curso del 63; Curso del 73	Antena 3 neox	2	6 October 2009 – 10 November 2009; 2 September 2012 – 30 September 2012
Germany	Die harte Schule der 50er Jahre	ZDF	1	19 May 2005 – 9 June 2005
Switzerland	Das Internat – Schule wie vor 50 Jahren	SF DRS	1	25 July 2005 – 15 August 2005
Italy	Il collegio	Rai 2	9	2 January 2017 – 13 January 2017; 26 September 2017 – 17 October 2017; 12 February 2019 – 12 March 2019; 22 October 2019 – 26 November 2019; 27 October 2020 – 15 December 2020; 26 October 2021 – 14 December 2021; 18 October 2022 – 29 November 2022; 24 September 2023 – 5 November 2023; 29 December 2025 – 4 February 2026
Russia	Колледж; Kolledzh	STS	1	15 March 2021 – 12 May 2021
