= Simon Warr =

British radio broadcaster (1953–2020)

- Born: Simon Roderick Warr; 9 September 1953; Haverfordwest, Wales
- Died: 22 February 2020 (aged 66)
- Citizenship: United Kingdom
- Education: Goldsmiths' College
- Occupation: Teacher
- Years active: 1971–2020
- Known for: Broadcasting; False allegations of historical child abuse
- Website: simonwarr.com

Simon Roderick Warr (9 September 1953 – 22 February 2020) was a British radio broadcaster, television personality, author and teacher. Warr was acquitted of allegations of historical child abuse and wrote a book about his experiences.

== Early life and education ==
Simon Roderick Warr was born in Haverfordwest in South Wales, on 9 September 1953. He was orphaned at the age of six. Warr was educated at the Royal Masonic School for Boys in Hertfordshire.

After leaving school he embarked on an acting course at the London Drama Centre. He transferred to Goldsmiths College, University of London, qualifying as a languages teacher in 1977. He was subsequently awarded a master's degree at the Roehampton Institute, University of Surrey.

== Career ==
=== Teaching ===
In 1981 Warr took up a post at St George's School, Stowmarket where he taught French, German and Latin. He also coached the 1st XV rugby squad.

From 1983 until his arrest in 2012, Warr taught languages at the Royal Hospital School, Ipswich.

=== Television ===
Warr's television career began in 2003 with BBC1's Rule the School. He was subsequently cast in the role of languages teacher and later headmaster in Channel 4's historical reality show That'll Teach 'Em which ran for three series from 2003 to 2006 and aimed to find out whether the standards of 1950s and 1960s boarding schools could produce better academic achievement for GCSE students. He also appeared in Channel 5's The Nightmare Neighbours Next Door.

His television appearances also included being a guest on The One Show (2007) and on Sunday Morning Live (2010-2012). He was also a contestant on Mastermind in 1981. Warr was the only person ever to have hosted Mastermind on BBC1 with Magnus Magnusson in the famous black chair as a contestant. This event is noted in Magnus Magnusson's autobiography I've Started, So I'll Finish (1998).

=== Radio broadcasting ===
Warr was a broadcaster on BBC Radio Suffolk, whose broadcasts included Saturday football reports, and he made regular appearances on BBC Radio 2's Jeremy Vine show. Between 2007 and 2012 Warr hosted The Warr Zone, a phone-in radio show. In 2015 he took on the focal role in On the Warr Path, a BBC radio programme in which he completed a weekly range of challenges set by the producers. These included modern dance, archery, taking part in an assault course, working as a car mechanic and learning to play the guitar.

In mid-January 2020, Warr fronted a phone-in current affairs discussion programme on BBC Radio Suffolk called Warr of Words. He made his final broadcast on 14 February, a week before he died.

=== Author ===
Warr was a columnist on the East Anglian Daily Times for several years while still a teacher at the Royal Hospital School.

He published a novel, Howson’s Choice, in 2011. It is a fictional retelling of the downfall of Peter Hobson, headmaster of Charterhouse, who resigned after his relationship with a female escort was exposed by a tabloid newspaper.

In March 2017 his book Presumed Guilty was published by Biteback Publishing. Presumed Guilty is Warr's account of spending almost two years on bail accused of historical abuse offences and his battle to clear his name after being acquitted of all charges. Presumed Guilty was reviewed by David Aaronovitch in The Times.

During 2019 he was a regular contributor to the online magazine sp!ked writing about false sexual allegations and criticising what he regarded as institutional shortcomings in police and prosecutorial practices, as well as what he termed the "compensation culture" which he believed fuelled false historical sexual allegations.

Shortly before his death he had completed the final draft of his second novel, provisionally entitled Swinefest, a fictional account of a criminal conspiracy by former pupils to frame a teacher for historical sexual abuse in pursuit of compensation by a school insurer.

== False allegations of historical child abuse ==
In December 2012, Warr was arrested and questioned by police following a complaint of historical child sexual abuse made by a man who had been a pupil at St George's School, Stowmarket, where Warr had taught. The school had already come under scrutiny in 1982 by investigative journalist Roger Cook over headmaster Derek Slade's use of corporal punishment and a 2010 trial which led to Slade being jailed for sexually abusing boys.

Warr was subsequently charged with indecent assault on three former pupils, two from St George's School and one from the Royal Hospital School. Warr pleaded not guilty to all charges and went on trial at Ipswich Crown Court in October 2014. Serious doubts emerged during the trial when evidence was given that he had never taught two of the complainants (both of whom had previously been awarded compensation in a different abuse case at the same school), and that a witness and complainant had changed their stories. The jury returned a unanimous verdict of not guilty on all charges within a matter of minutes of being sent out by the judge.

Warr later said that: "One of the biggest tragedies of cases like mine is that it makes it more difficult for people who have actually been abused to be believed". A spokesman for the Crown Prosecution Service justified the prosecution, saying: "We were satisfied there was sufficient evidence for a realistic prospect of conviction and it was in the public interest to prosecute".

Warr appeared on BBC Newsnight after his acquittal to discuss the way in which historical allegations are handled by police and the Crown Prosecution Service. He was also interviewed about the case on BBC2 and BBC Radio 5 Live.

He subsequently wrote about his 672-day ordeal, including nearly two years on police bail, the trial, and his acquittal in an essay entitled "Something Good Has to Come from This", published in The Justice Gap magazine in 2015, followed by his 2017 book Presumed Guilty. He also appeared on Jeremy Vine, along with Labour MP Sarah Champion, to debate how historical sexual allegations should be handled by police.

== Death ==
On 20 February 2020, Warr announced on Twitter that he had a "very serious health condition"; he died of pancreatic and liver cancer in the early hours of 22 February 2020.
