= Mondo Enduro =

Motorcycle Adventure television series

- Genre: Motorcycle Adventure television series
- Created by: Gerald Vince
- Directed by: Austin Vince
- Starring: Andy Bell; Louis Bloom; Clive Greenhough; Mark Friend; Chas Penty; Nick Stubley; Austin Vince; Gerald Vince
- No. of episodes: 2 with 12 chapters total

Production
- Executive producer: Ahmad Ahmadzadeh
- Producer: Peter Higgins
- Editor: Hugh Williams
- Production company: Aimimage Productions
- Budget: Self financed and unsponsored

Original release
- Release: 1997

Related
- Terra Circa

Mondo Enduro was a round-the-world adventure motorcycle expedition in 1995-1996. Team members Austin Vince, Gerald Vince, Chas Penty, Bill Penty, Clive Greenhough, Nick Stubley and Mark Friend set off to go round the world by the longest route possible in the shortest time on Suzuki DR350 Dual Sport bikes.

Their route took them from London, through Central Asia, Kazakhstan and Siberia; then from Alaska to Chile and finally from Cape Town through Africa and the Middle East back to London.

The expedition was filmed and was subsequently made into a 2-part TV series shown on Discovery Travel and Adventure Channel.

The greatest difficulties in the expedition came in the Zilov Gap, the 400-mile roadless section in Siberia. The team became bogged down here and eventually ended up taking the Trans-Siberian railroad to circumvent the last 100 miles of the Zilov Gap.

As well as a TV show and DVD, the expedition diaries (ISBN 1-904466-28-1) give an account of a round-the-world expedition done on a shoestring budget with rough camping.

== Episodes ==
No.	Title	Route
Chapter–1	"Preparation"	Mill Hill School and Geralds garage
Mondo Enduro team is introduced. They prepare their bikes, train how to ride and launch their expedition
Chapter–2	"Europe"	Mill Hill School - Dover - Ferry to France - Nice - Pisa - Monte Cassino - Bari - Ferry to Greece - Northern Greece
Mondo Enduro team adapts themselves to road life. Home sickness and small mishaps happen.
Chapter–3	"Turkey to Uzbekistan"	Istanbul - Central Turkey highlands - Armenian border - Georgia - Azerbaijan
Forgotten essential documents for one of riders force them to invent novel solutions. Chains snap and tyres are punctured numerous times. Turkey-Armenia border is something else than Mondo Enduro team think it is.
Chapter–4	"Central Asia"	Baku - Caspian Sea ferry - Turkmenistan - Bukhara - Samarkand - Kazakhstan
Mondo Enduro team follows the ancient Silk Road and enjoys the rich heritage of ancient towns on the route. Kazakhstan has vast empty sections where no other traffic, nor fuel, is available. Petrol is available from private vendors selling it from their lorries.
Chapter–5	"Russia"	Barnaul - Iskitim - Novosibirsk - Irkutsk (Andy, Mark and Nick leave the team due to time constraints) - Zilov Gap - Skovorodino
Post Soviet Russia is shockingly poor and shops are empty. Street side vendors are the only source to get supplies for the team. Never before seen Westerners with their bikes are a local attraction every time Mondo Enduro team makes a stop. M53 highway construction is in progress and road conditions are bad. Team makes a stunning discovery when one of the bikes has serious problems. Zilov Gap is much tougher than expected and while team gets exhausted the bikes start falling apart. 100 miles before the end of the gap riders make the decision use the train for the rest of it before returning to road driving.
Chapter–6	"The Road to Magadan"	Skovorodino - Yakutsk - Lena River barge - Khandyga - Magadan
Mondo Enduro starts their drive towards Magadan. Since there were no passable roads going north from Yakutsk at the time they use a river barge on Lena River get to the next town Handyga, where the road starts again. Team arrives to Magadan 111 days after their departure.
Chapter–7	"Canada & USA"	Anchorage - Vancouver - San Francisco - Los Angeles - Nogales - Mexico
Bikes and drivers are both transported via air to Alaska. Return to good roads and availability of products is a culture shock after months of enduring bad roads and scarcity. One team member has to quit due to running out of money. Remaining three members continue the journey towards Mexico.
Chapter–8	"Central America"	Guatemala - Honduras - San Salvador - Coatepeque Caldera - Nicaragua - Costa Rica - Panama
While being warned for the difficulties and security conditions of the Central America Mondo Enduro team encounters friendly people, who help them out of trouble. Mondo Enduro makes quick progress through the Central America and take a ferry to Colombia
Chapter–9	"South America"	Colombia - Bogotá - Ecuador - Quito - Peru - Trujillo - Atacama Desert - Chile - Santiago
Andes Mountains make the roads more challenging. A friend living in Peru offers much needed refuge for the team repair their bikes. Pan American highway is the 3000 miles long lifeline across the Atacama Desert. Mondo Enduro team are air transported to South Africa with their bikes.
Chapter–10	"South Africa"	South Africa - Johannesburg - Zimbabwe - Victoria Falls - Zambia - Malawi - Tanzania
Mondo Enduro gets a new rider joining them from South Africa. They get their fifteen minutes of fame when a local TV station conducts an interview. Continuous torrential rain and bike breakdowns follow when the team makes progress towards north.
Chapter–11	"East Africa"	Kenya - Nairobi - Ethiopia - Eritrea - Massawa - Red Sea Ferry - Saudi Arabia - Jeddah
Wildlife is seen close when Mondo Enduro makes a visit to the nature park near Nairobi. Team manages to secure visas for the coming countries on their route. Roads return to gravel and Mondo Enduro crosses the Equator for their second time. One of the drivers has a serious accident in Ethiopia.
Chapter–12	"The Middle East & Europe"	Jeddah - Jordan - Petra - Syria - Damascus - Turkey - Cappadocia - Bulgaria - Serbia - Hungary - Budapest - Czech Republic - Prague - Germany - Frankfurt - Belgium - France - London
While on the ferry to Saudi Arabia Mondo Enduro team notices that their Visas have some special limitations. They decide to risk it anyway and it pays off. Jordan offers wondrous sights. Video cameras are frowned upon Syria and Damascus. Team encounters a man on a long walking journey. After crossing the Bosporus strait exactly one year after they had done it the other direction team senses how close London and their home is. Good roads take them back home where a welcoming party awaits them.

== Music ==
Mondo Enduro uses short musical inserts very often. Most of the music is performed by "The Quakers" band, where Austin Vince is one of the music composers and instrument players.

== See also ==
- List of long-distance motorcycle riders

Terra Circa expedition made a new attempt to cross the Zilov Gap in 2001, only few years before it ceased to exist due to Trans-Siberian Highway construction patching the gap.

== Books ==
- Vince, Austin; Bloom, Louis et al. (2006) Mondo Enduro. Ripping Yarns.com. ISBN 1-904466-28-1.
