= Never, Amur Oblast =

Never Невер
- Selo
- Location within Amur Oblast Location within Russia
- Coordinates: 53°58′N 124°08′E
- Country: Russia
- Region: Amur Oblast
- District: Skovorodinsky District
- Time zone: UTC+9:00

Never (Russian: Невер) is a rural locality (a selo) in Neversky Selsoviet of Skovorodinsky District, Amur Oblast, Russia. The population was 1,400 as of 2018. There are 34 streets.

== Geography ==
Never is located on the Bolshoy Never River, 16 km east of Skovorodino (the district's administrative centre) by road. Bolshoy Never is the nearest rural locality.
