= R297 highway =

Road in Russia

Federal Highway R297
- Федеральная автомобильная дорога Р297
- Amur Highway

Route information
- Part of AH30 AH31
- Length: 2,100 km (1,300 mi)
- History: Formerly M58 before 2018

Major junctions
- West end: R 258 in Chita

- East end: A 370 in Khabarovsk

Location
- Country: Russia

Highway system
- Russian Federal Highways

The Russian route R297 or the Amur Highway (so named after the nearby Amur River) is a federal highway in Russia, part of the Trans-Siberian Highway. With a length of 2,100 km (1,300 mi), it is the longest segment, from Chita to Khabarovsk, connecting the paved roads of Siberia with those of the Russian Far East. The construction of the road united the Russian federal highways into a single system stretching from Saint Petersburg to Vladivostok. Before completion of the road, the Russian Pacific coast was connected to the rest of the country only by airlines, the Trans-Siberian Railway, and the Baikal–Amur Mainline.

For most of its route, the highway parallels the China–Russia border at a distance of 100–200 km (62–124 mi). As of 2010, it still included unpaved sections. It traverses the sparsely populated regions of Zabaykalsky Krai, Amur Oblast, Jewish Autonomous Oblast, and Khabarovsk Krai.

== Early history ==
The most problematic stretch of the highway lies between Chita and Khabarovsk. The first section of this route, linking Belogorsk to Blagoveshchensk (124 km (77 mi) in length), was constructed by gulag inmates as early as 1949.

In 1966, the Council of Ministers of the Soviet Union ordered the construction of the 2,165 km (1,345 mi)-long Chita-Khabarovsk highway, which would run through permafrost-covered soil and mountainous areas. After a long feasibility study, construction began in 1978. The Soviet Road Troops began constructing the highway. Due to the difficulty of the natural conditions, after nearly 20 years of construction only 605 km (376 mi) had been built, around Chita, Blagoveshchensk, and Khabarovsk. The road from Chita to Khabarovsk at that time, in the mid-1990s, consisted largely of undeveloped taiga glades that were passable only in winter.

On May 24, 1995, the government of the Russian Federation passed a resolution "On accelerating the construction of the Chita-Khabarovsk federal road." Shortly thereafter, another 389 km (242 mi) of the highway was completed. In September 2001, the Russian Ministry of Transport increased funding for the project significantly in order to bring it toward completion, allocating 26% of the entire federal transportation budget to the highway. By 2002, the road became technically passable for the first time (with major difficulties, see next section), and 500-700 cars per day began to use it. As part of the Asian route AH31, the road completed the connection from Belogorsk to Dalian in China.

== The Zilov Gap ==
The section of the Chita–Khabarovsk road known as the Zilov Gap was largely unfinished until 2010 and was known during the semiannual mud seasons to be notoriously difficult to traverse. Traveling a distance of 300 m (980 ft) could take as long as three hours, and the route involved numerous serious river crossings.

It posed a major challenge to long-distance overland expeditions and nearly caused the end of the Mondo Enduro expedition. The Long Way Round trip avoided it altogether. Motorcyclist Jim Oliver traveled the entire route in May–June 2004 and described massive marshes, gravel, rock, mud, sand, washboarding, potholes, stream fording, and detours along the elusive highway, with a noticeable absence of pavement. Many motorcyclists were injured or killed trying to "master" the Amur Highway.

To avoid the gap, drivers would typically load their cars onto the Trans-Siberian Railroad at Chernyshevsk for the 800-km trip to Magdagachi.

In 2010, the highway was paved, including the "Zilov Gap" section.

== Completion of the highway ==
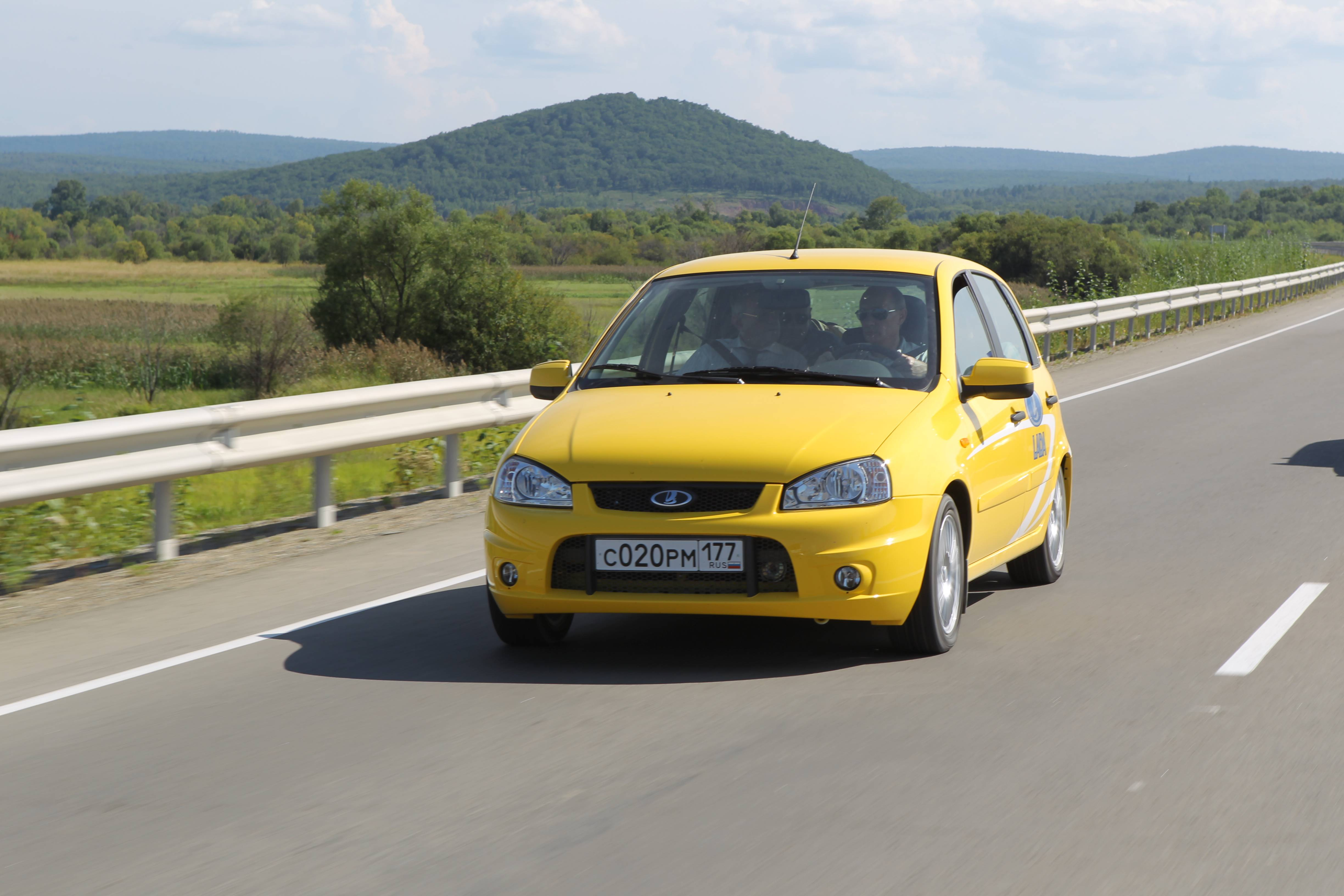
Russia's Prime Minister Vladimir Putin promotes the Lada Kalina brand by driving through the recently opened Amur Highway in 2010

In early 2004, Russian president Vladimir Putin symbolically opened the Amur Highway, with great swaths of forest separating major portions from one another. At this time, large sections of the highway were still dirt or crushed stone roads.

From 2008-2010, 35 billion rubles (roughly US$1.05 billion in 2009) were allocated to complete paving of the highway. The St. Petersburg Times reported in September 2010 that paving had been completed. At a videoconference marking the event, Putin described it as "a dependable, modern farm road, but not the Autobahn." Shortly afterward, a memorial marker for the "Zero kilometer of the Chita-Khabarovsk Federal Highway" was installed in Lenin Square, Khabarovsk, marking the final completion of the 40-year construction project.

Today, the Chita–Khabarovsk road is a modern paved highway with painted, reflective lane-lines.

== Major junctions and cities traversed ==
- Chita
- A360 Lena Highway to Yakutsk
- Birobidzhan
- Khabarovsk, via the Khabarovsk Bridge
- A370 highway to Vladivostok

== Gallery ==
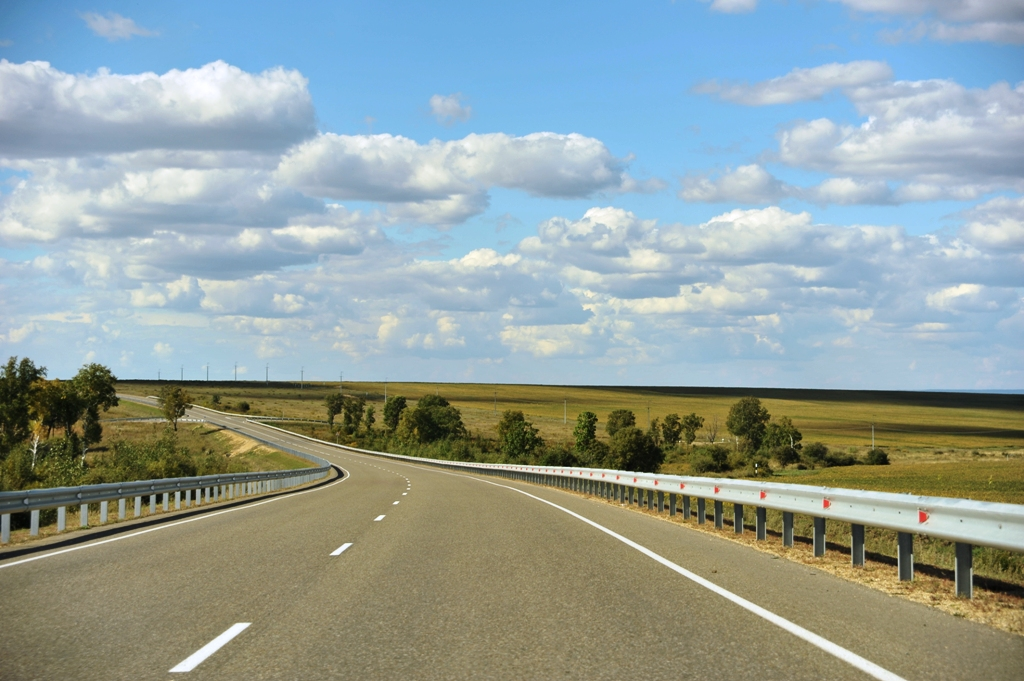
View of the Amur Highway, 2015

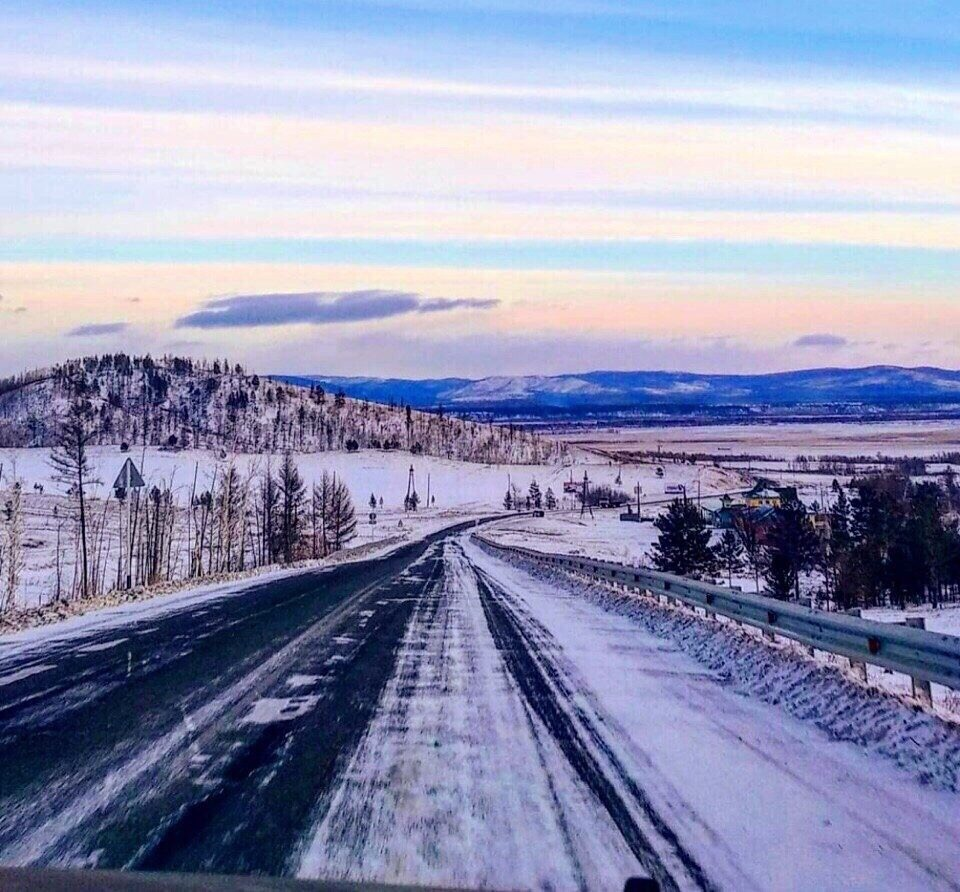
Amur Highway in winter near the village of Takhtamygda, 2010

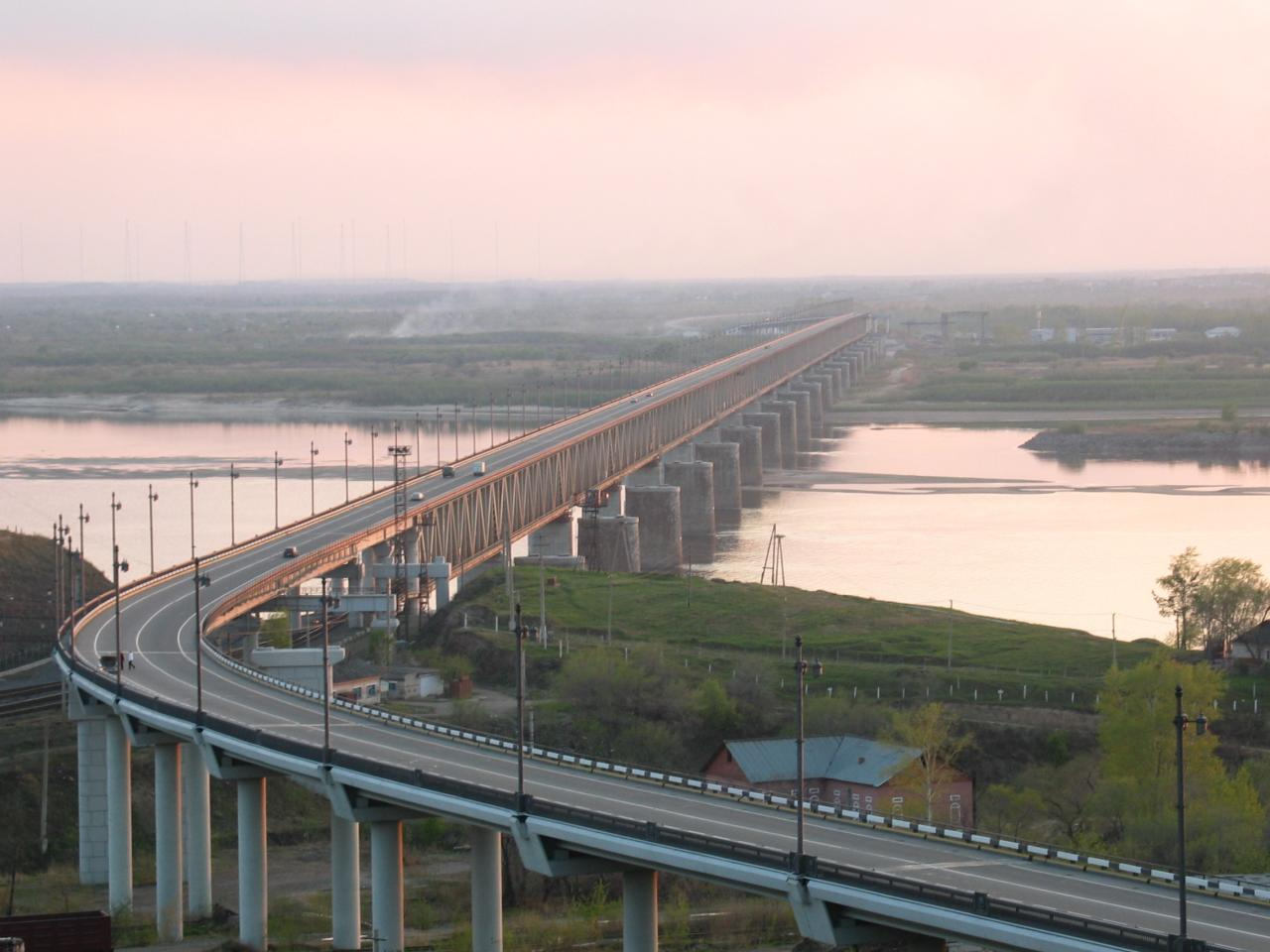
Khabarovsk Bridge at the far eastern end of the highway, constructed in 1999.
