= Lee Klancher =

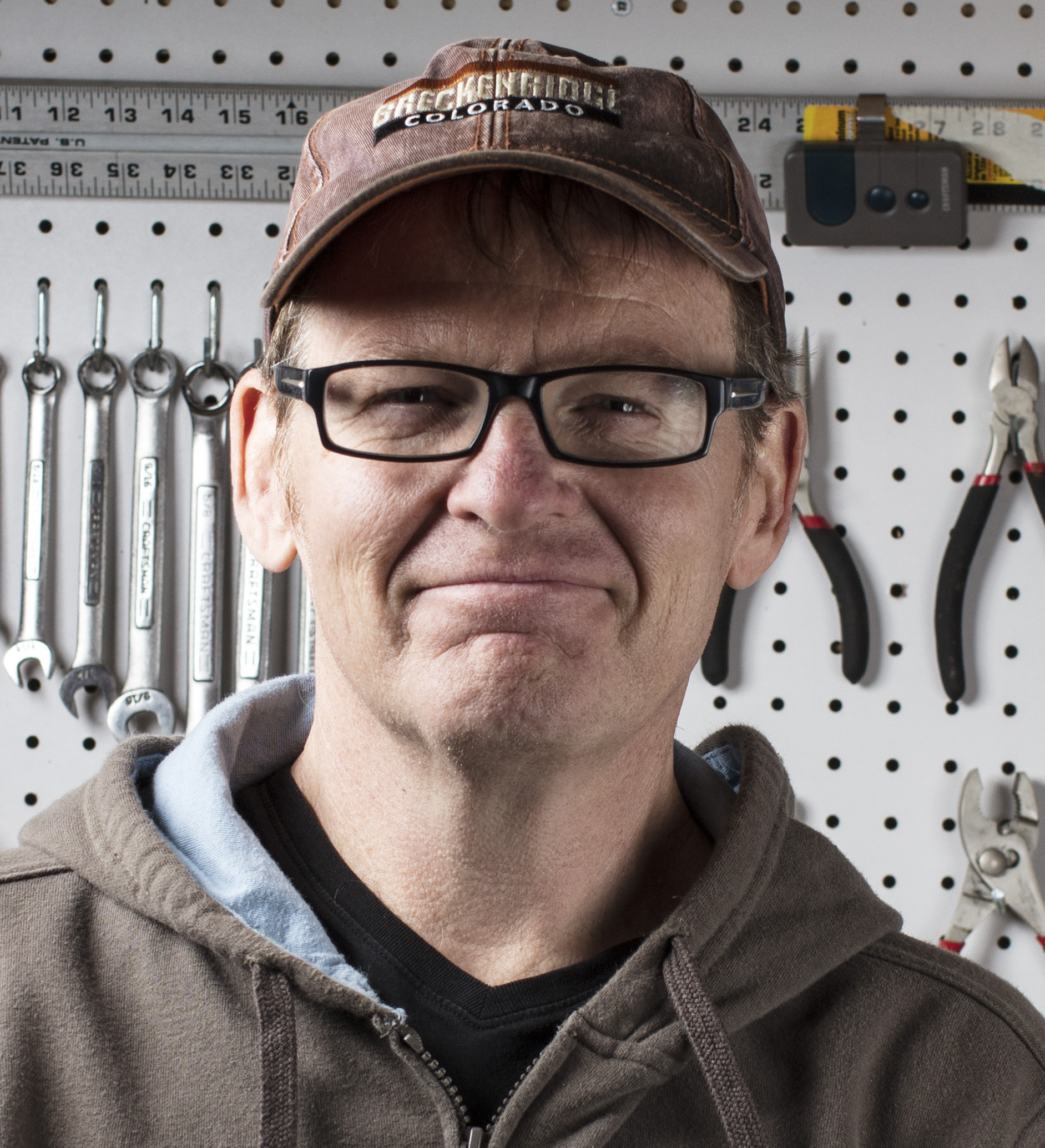
- Klancher in a garage
- Occupation: Photographer, author, publisher
- Notable works: John Deere Evolution Red Tractors: 1958–2022 Adventurous Motorcyclist's Guide to Alaska

Website
- leeklancher.com

Lee Klancher's career encompasses more than 30 years of publishing stories. As an editor and publisher, he has overseen the development of some of the best-selling books in the transportation niche. As an author and photographer, Lee has contributed words and images to more than 30 books as well as dozens of national magazines.

Klancher has also taught writing and photography at the Minneapolis College of Art and Design. He is best known for his award-winning books and calendars covering farm tractors, including Red Tractors and Red 4WD Tractors. He has rented an abandoned air force base to create a book cover, and built a custom 20x40-foot studio to photograph 30 of the most valuable John Deeres in private hands. He and his camera have climbed the Julian Alps, explored breweries on four continents, and ridden backcountry motorcycle routes in the Bolivian Amazon, the Australian Outback, and on the island of Hokkaido, Japan.

== Works ==
Lee Klancher is a photographer and writer who has contributed words and images to more than 30 books, as well as dozens of national magazines, including Men’s Journal, Draft, and Motorcyclist.

Klancher is best known for photography of collectible farm tractors that appears in his books and calendars. For The Art of John Deere, he built a custom 20x40-foot studio to photograph 30 rare John Deere tractors. His books Red Tractors 1958–2013 and Red Combines 1915–2015 chronicle the history of farm equipment with an emphasis on the engineering, design, and cultural influences that created them.

His books have won several awards, including Benjamin Franklin Awards for the Adventurous Motorcyclist’s Guide to Alaska, Red Tractors 1958–2013, and Red Combines 1915–2015 .

Klancher founded Octane Press—a niche publishing house that specializes in books and calendars about cars, farm machines, motorsports, and motorcycles—in his garage in the mid-2000s in Austin, Texas. The company has since grown, and it now produces 6–12 titles per year on average, filing a transportation niche by creating and selling books that appeal to collectors, history and engineering buffs, and those who are nostalgic for machines of the past.

Klancher has appeared on the Cars Yeah podcast and the Writers Cast podcast, where he talked about building a publishing company from the ground up.

His titles have been reviewed in major publications. He was interviewed by Jon Michaud in The New Yorker about the anthology The Devil Can Ride: The World's Best Motorcycle Writing. His title, John Deere Evolution, was reviewed in The Wall Street Journal by Peter Saenger, who wrote that the "story involves a surprising amount of intrigue."

Klancher has made several appearances on Jay Leno's Garage, a television series about motor vehicles hosted by Jay Leno. The first time he appeared on Jay Leno’s Garage in 2008 was with his title, Motorcycle Dream Garages. “I mailed a copy of the book to the garage to Jay’s attention,” says Klancher, “and he called me on a Saturday night. I nearly didn’t answer because his phone is blocked, and I assumed it was someone calling to market something.” In one thirty-four minute episode, Jay Leno drove a 2017 Case IH Quadtrac down city streets, discussed the history of the machine, and showcased Klancher's book Red 4WD Tractors.

Klancher has been a regular contributor to several tractor-based podcasts and shows. He spoke about his career and shared tractor knowledge during interviews and appearances on In Ohio Country with Host Dan Wilson. He has shared tractor knowledge and talked about his tractor-related titles on the show, This Week in Agribusiness, hosted by American radio broadcaster Max Armstrong, and he has appeared several times on Classic Tractors TV.

== Awards and nominations ==
=== John Deere Evolution ===
- IBPA Benjamin Franklin Award, March 2022

John Deere Evolution won gold in the History and Cover Design categories of the 2022 Benjamin Franklin Awards.

- IPPY Independent Publisher Book Award, May 2022

John Deere Evolution won a gold award in the Transportation category of the 2022 Independent Publisher Book Awards (IPPY Awards).

=== Victory Motorcycles: 1998–2017 ===
- IBPA Benjamin Franklin Award, April 2019

Victory Motorcycles won a gold in the Professional and Technical, Cover Design: Large Format categories and a silver in the Reference category of the 2019 Benjamin Franklin Awards.

=== TRACTOR ===
- IBPA Benjamin Franklin Award, April 2019

TRACTOR won a gold Benjamin Franklin Award in the Interior Design category and a silver Benjamin Franklin Award in the History category.

=== Red 4WD Tractors: 1957–2017 ===
- IBPA Benjamin Franklin Award, April 2018

Red 4WD Tractors: 1957–2017 won a gold Benjamin Franklin Award in the Reference Category and a sliver Benjamin Franklin Award in the History category.

- Independent Publisher Book Awards (IPPY), April 2018

Red 4WD Tractors: 1957–2017 won a gold award in the Transportation category of the Independent Publisher Book Awards (IPPY Awards).

=== Red Combines: 1915–2015 ===
- Independent Publisher Book Awards (IPPY), April 2016

Red Combines: 1915-2015 won a gold award in the Transportation category of the Independent Publisher Book Awards (IPPY Awards).

=== Red Tractors: 1958–2013 ===
- IBPA Benjamin Franklin Award, April 2014

Red Tractors: 1958–2013 won a gold Benjamin Franklin Award in the History category.

- Independent Publisher Book Awards (IPPY), May 2014

Red Tractors: 1958–2013 won a bronze award in the Transportation category of the Independent Publisher Book Awards (IPPY Awards).

=== Adventurous Motorcyclist's Guide to Alaska ===
- IBPA Benjamin Franklin Award, May 2013

The Adventurous Motorcyclist's Guide to Alaska won a silver Benjamin Franklin Award in the Travel category.

== Bibliography ==
- Adventurous Motorcyclist's Guide to Alaska
- The Art of the John Deere Tractor
- The Farmall Dynasty
- Red 4WD Tractors: 1957–2017
- Red Combines: 1915–2015 (second edition, Red Combines: 1915–2020)
- Red Tractors: 1958–2013 (second edition, Red Tractors: 1958–2018; third edition, Red Tractors: 1958–2022)
- John Deere Evolution
- Motorcycle Dream Garages
- How to Build Your Dream Garage
- Tractor in the Pasture
- TRACTOR: The Heartland Innovation, Ground-Breaking Machines, Midnight Schemes, Secret Garages, and Farmyard Geniuses that Mechanized Agriculture
- Victory Motorcycles: 1998–2017
