= A370 highway (Russia) =

Road in Russia

Federal Highway A370
- Федеральная автомобильная дорога А370
- Ussuri Highway

Route information
- Part of AH6 AH30
- Length: 760 km (470 mi)

Major junctions
- North end: R 297 at Khabarovsk
- South end: Loop around Vladivostok

Location
- Country: Russia

Highway system
- Russian Federal Highways

The Russian route A370 or the Ussuri Highway (named for the nearby Ussuri River) is a federal highway in Russia that forms part of the Trans-Siberian Highway. It runs from Khabarovsk to Vladivostok with a total length of 760 km. Most of the route is designated as part of Asian Highway 30, with the final section from Ussuriysk to Vladivostok forming part of AH6.

The highway runs through the Russian regions of Primorsky Krai and Khabarovsk Krai.

== History ==
On December 11, 1933, the Council of Labor and Defense of the USSR issued a decree establishing the Road Construction Directorate of Eastern Siberia and the Far East, to be headquartered in Khabarovsk and known by the Russian abbreviation Daldorstroi (from the words for "far" [east], "road," and "construction"). It was assigned the task of building strategic highways in the regions of Eastern Siberia and the Russian Far East. The construction plans were announced at the 17th Congress of the All-Union Communist Party (Bolsheviks) in 1934 as part of the second Soviet Five-Year Plan. The plan outlined construction of the Vladivostok-Khabarovsk highway with a hard (gravel) surface and a length of 600 kilometres (370 mi).

Between December 1933 and January 1934, the Red Army formed two brigades of road troops for Daldorstroi: the first from Rostov-on-Don and the second from Kiev, totaling about 15,000 personnel to be redeployed to the Far East. The headquarters of the first brigade would be the village of Dmitriyevka, Primorsky Krai, while the second would be the city of Khabarovsk. The first brigade carried out construction from Vladivostok to Iman, and the second from Iman to Khabarovsk. On November 4, 1935, the official Communist Party newspaper Pravda published an article signed by the head of Daldorstroi, Y. F. Frumkina, announcing the completion of the construction of "the most significant highway, Vladivostok - Khabarovsk."

== Gallery ==
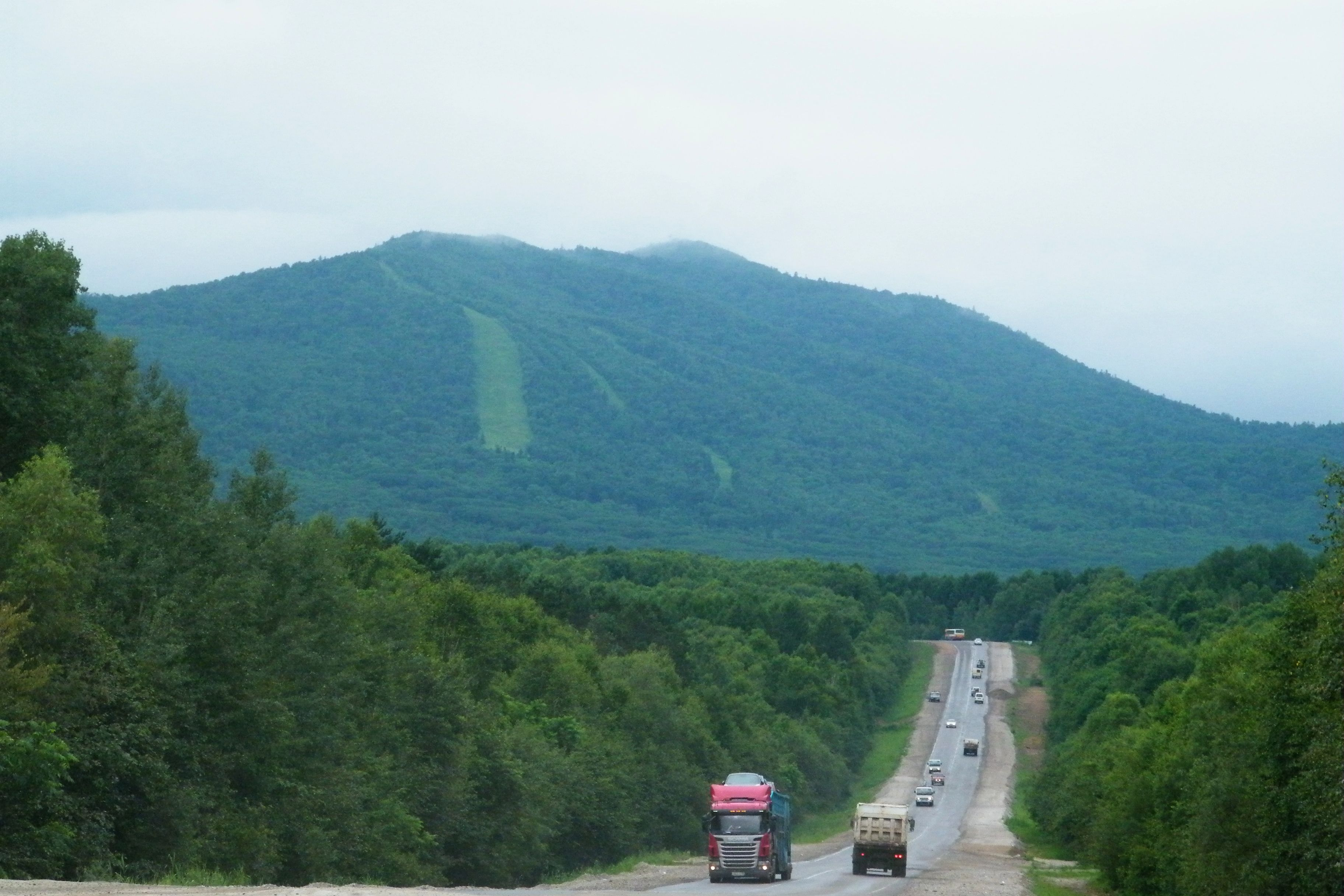
An alpine ski slope is visible on the slopes of the Khekhtsir ridge, seen from the A370 highway, Khabarovsk Krai

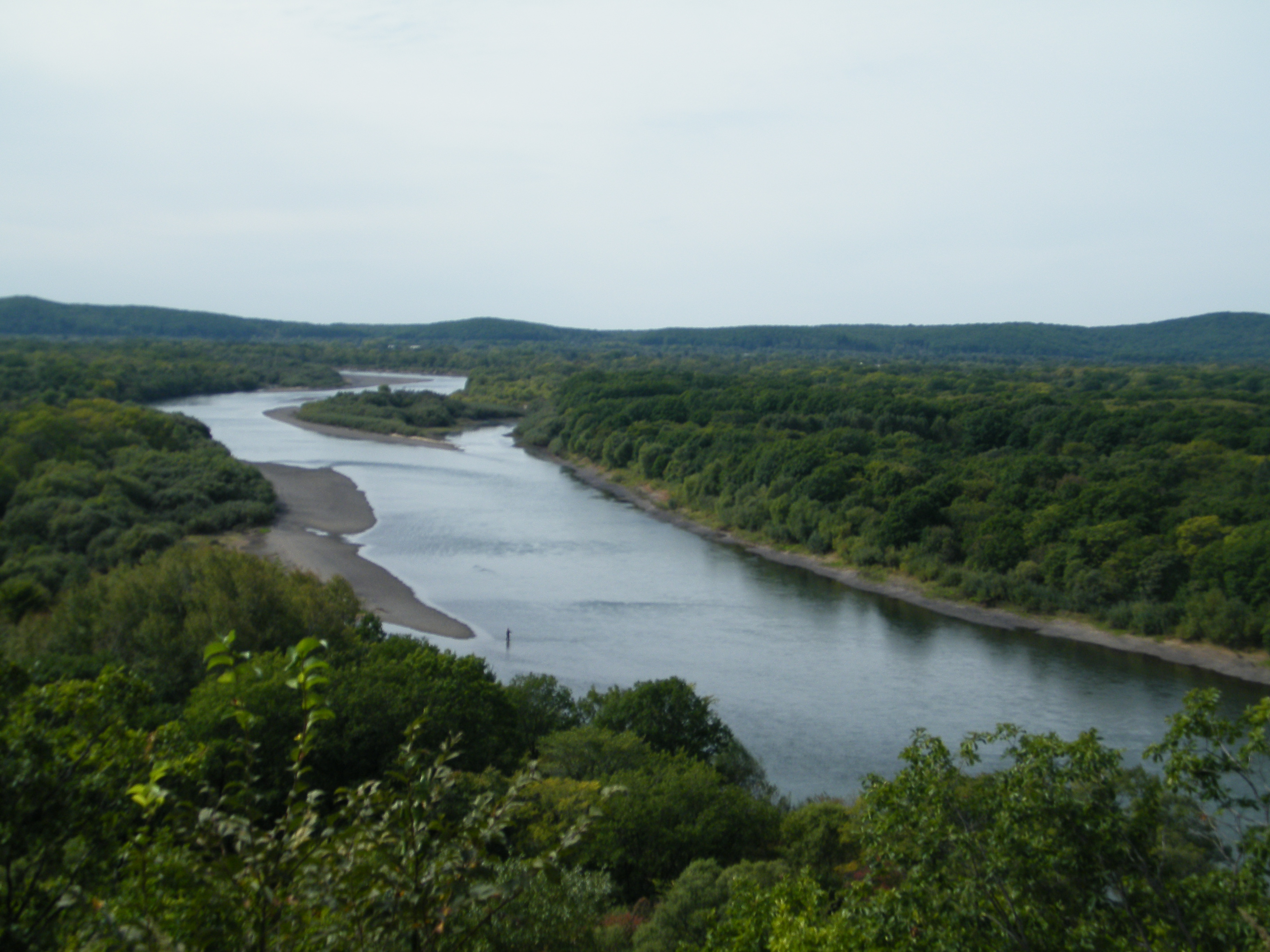
View of the Ussuri River near the village of Gornye Klyuchi
